= Wilcox House =

Wilcox House, or Wilcox Farm or Wilcox Farmhouse, may refer to:

in Canada

- Wilcox House, Mississauga, Ontario, one of the oldest buildings and structures in Mississauga

in the United States

- Maria Antonia Arguella Wilcox House, Los Angeles, California, a contributing property in North University Park Historic District
- Benjamin Wilcox House, San Juan Bautista, San Benito County, California, listed on the National Register of Historic Places (NRHP)
- Joseph Wilcox House, included in Highland Historic District (Middletown, Connecticut)
- Josiah Wilcox House, Greenwich, Connecticut, NRHP-listed
- Albert Spencer Wilcox Beach House, Hanalei, Hawaii, NRHP-listed
- Albert Spencer Wilcox Building, Lihue, Hawaii, NRHP-listed
- Andrew Wilcox House, Jackson, Jackson County, Michigan, NRHP-listed
- Ansley Wilcox House, Buffalo, New York, included in the Theodore Roosevelt Inaugural National Historic Site
- Wilcox Octagon House, Camillus, New York, NRHP-listed
- Richard T.C. Lord and William V. Wilcox House, Des Moines, Iowa, NRHP-listed
- Swart-Wilcox House, Oneonta, Otsego County, New York, NRHP-listed
- W. G. Wilcox House, Plattsburgh, New York, NRHP-listed
- Wilcox Farmhouse (Three Mile Bay, New York), NRHP-listed
- Gray-Brownlow-Wilcox House, Brinkleyville, Halifax County, North Carolina
- Jacob Wilcox Farm, Amlin, Franklin County, Ohio, NRHP-listed in Franklin County
- James Wilcox House, Amlin, Franklin County, Ohio, NRHP-listed in Franklin County
- Wilcox-Mills House, Marietta, Washington County, Ohio, NRHP-listed in Washington County
- Gilbert-Wilcox House, Worthington, Franklin County, Ohio, NRHP-listed in Franklin County
- Theodore B. Wilcox Country Estate, in Multnomah County near Portland, Oregon, NRHP-listed in Multnomah County
- Joseph Stanton House, also known as Wilcox Tavern and General Stanton Monument, Charlestown, Rhode Island, NRHP-listed
- Wilcox-Graves House, Georgetown, Williamson County, Texas, NRHP-listed in Williamson County
- D. K. and Inez Wilcox House, Georgetown, Williamson County, Texas, NRHP-listed in Williamson County
- James D. Wilcox House, Farmington, Davis County, Utah, NRHP-listed in Davis County
- Wilcox-Cutts House, Orwell, Addison County, Vermont, NRHP-listed in Addison County
- Charles Wilcox House, Yakima, Yakima County, Washington, NRHP-listed in Yakima County
- Walter D. Wilcox House (better known as the Whittemore House), listed on the NRHP-listed in Washington, D.C.
- Roy Wilcox House, Eau Claire, Wisconsin, NRHP-listed in Eau Claire County

== See also ==
- Wilcox Building (disambiguation)
