= Amundsen House =

Amundsen House may refer to:

in Norway

- Roald Amundsen's Home, Uranienborg, Oslo

in the United States

- Roy E. and Hildur L. Amundsen House, Gresham, Oregon
- Dyre and Maria Amundsen House, Murray, Utah

== See also ==
- Roald Amundsen Pullman Private Railroad Car, Scottsdale, Arizona, listed on the National Register of Historic Places
