= Lanai (disambiguation) =

Lānaʻi is a Hawaiian island.

Lanai may also refer to:

- Lanai (architecture), a type of patio
- Lānaʻi City, Hawaii
- LANAI, a 1983 album by Yu Hayami
