= Wilcox Building =

Wilcox Building may refer to:

- Wilcox Building (Los Angeles), Downtown Los Angeles (built 1896) — at the southeast corner of Spring Street and 2nd Street.
- Wilcox Building (Portland, Oregon), NRHP-listed
- Albert Spencer Wilcox Building, Lihue, Hawaii — see also Albert Spencer Wilcox Beach House
- Wilcox Female Institute, Camden, Alabama, NRHP-listed
- Peck, Stow & Wilcox Factory, Southington, Connecticut, NRHP-listed
- Wilcox, Crittenden Mill, Middletown, Connecticut, NRHP-listed
- Wilcox School-District 29, Ransom, Kansas, listed on the NRHP in Kansas

== See also ==
- Wilcox House (disambiguation)
