= Chi Psi Fraternity House =

Chi Psi Fraternity House may refer to:

- Chi Psi Fraternity House (Champaign, Illinois), formerly listed on the National Register of Historic Places in Champaign County, Illinois
- Chi Psi Fraternity House (Eugene, Oregon)
