= Christina Anderson =

Christina Anderson may refer to:

- Christina Anderson (playwright), American playwright and educator
- Christina Anderson, mother of kidnapping victim Hannah Anderson

== See also ==
- Emanuel and Christina Anderson House, Gresham, Oregon
- Christine Anderson (born 1968), German politician
