= New Fliedner Building =

Building in Portland, Oregon, U.S.

Coordinates: 45.5216°N 122.6816°W

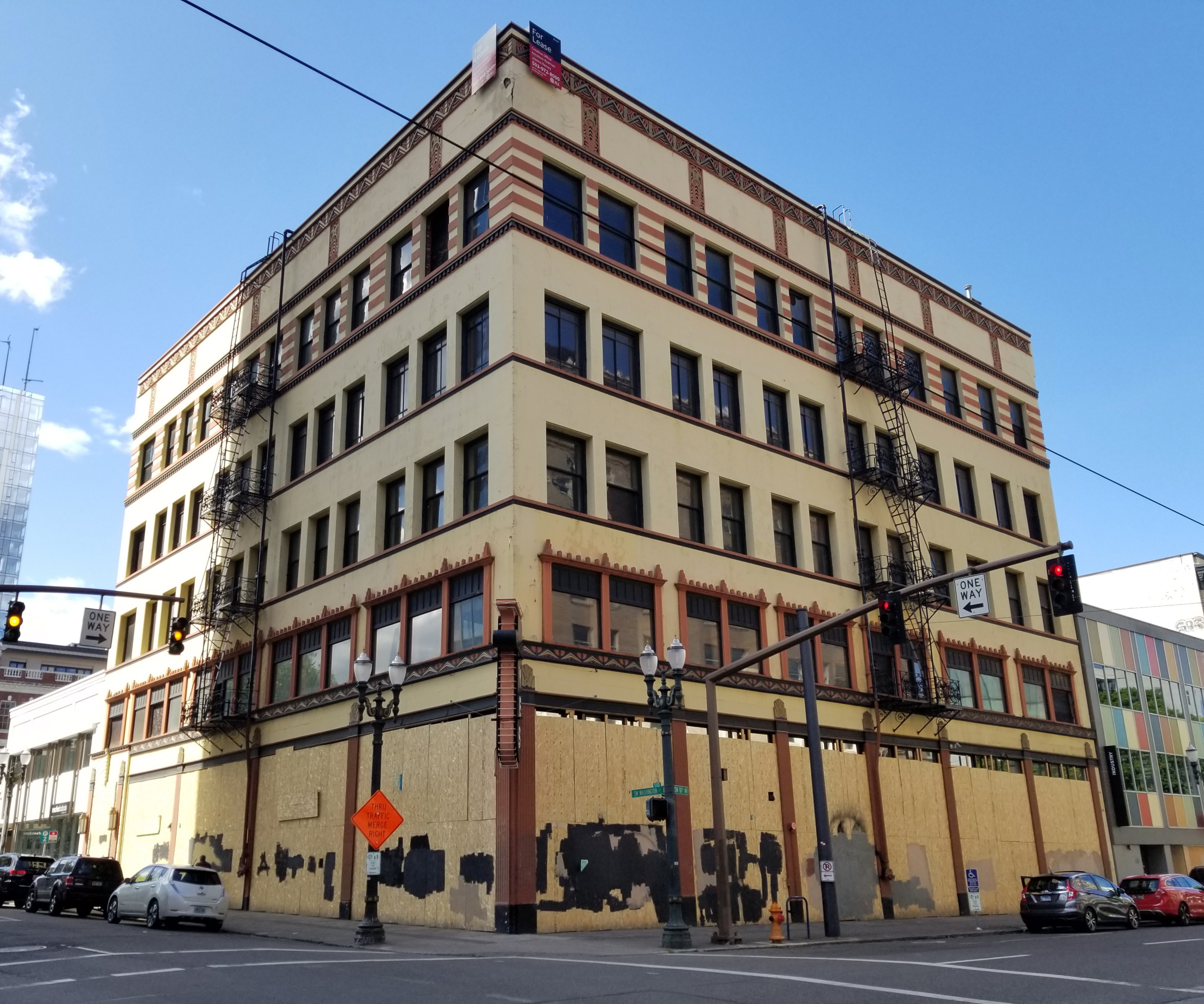
- The building's exterior in 2021

General information
- Architectural style: Art Deco / Zigzag Moderne
- Location: 1017 SW Washington St; Portland, Oregon, United States
- Year built: 1906
- Renovated: 1931

Height
- Height: 80 feet (24 m)

Technical details
- Material: Masonry
- Floor count: 5 + basement
- Floor area: 45,000 square feet (4,200 m^{2})

Design and construction
- Architects: William Whidden, Ion Lewis

Renovating team
- Architect: Richard Sundeleaf

Other information
- Public transit: NS Library/SW 9th Ave
- New Fliedner Building
- U.S. National Register of Historic Places
- NRHP reference No.: 100005725
- Added to NRHP: October 26, 2020

The New Fliedner Building is a historic building in Portland, Oregon, United States. It was listed on the National Register of Historic Places in 2020.

== Sources ==
- Tess, John M. (July 8, 2020). National Register of Historic Places Registration Form: New Fliedner Building (PDF) (Report). National Park Service. pp. 14–17.
