= Fred Harlow House =

Historic house in Oregon, United States

Coordinates: 45°32′17.5″N 122°22′57″W

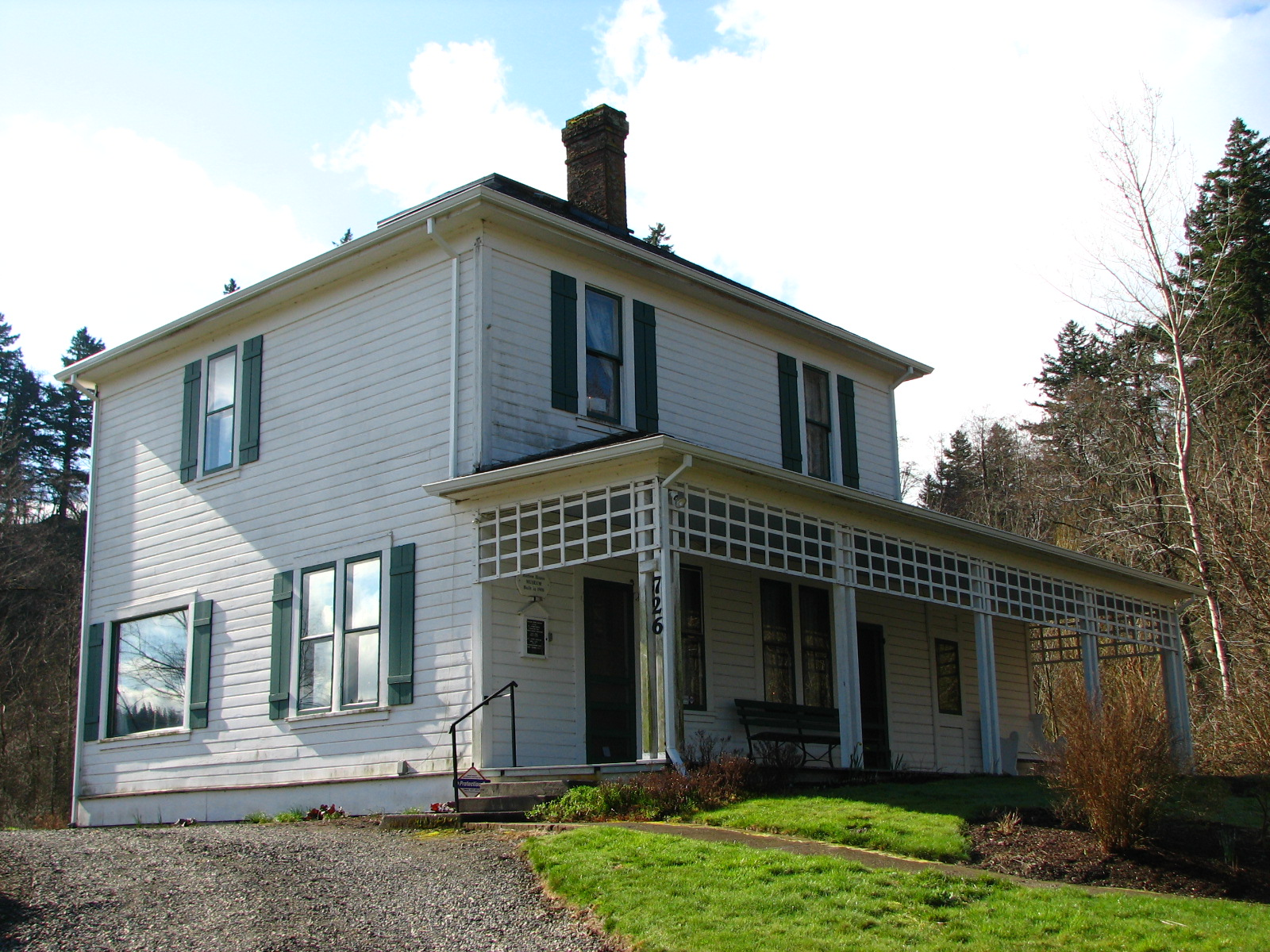

- Location within Oregon Location within the United States
- Area: 1.4 acres (0.57 ha)

The Fred Harlow House, located in Troutdale, Oregon, is listed on the National Register of Historic Places. The building sits within the 1.4-acre (0.57 ha) Harlow House Park.

== See also ==
- National Register of Historic Places listings in Multnomah County, Oregon
