= Bethel Baptist Church (Gresham, Oregon) =

Historic church in Oregon, United States

- Formerly listed on the U.S. National Register of Historic Places
- Location within Oregon Location within the United States
- Location: 101 South Main Ave; Gresham, Oregon
- Coordinates: 45.497178°N 122.431626°W
- Area: 0.4 acres (0.16 ha)
- Built: 1886
- Architect: Peter Engles
- Architectural style: Late 19th and 20th Century Revivals, Carpenter Gothic Revival
- NRHP reference No.: 82003740

Significant dates
- Added to NRHP: 1982
- Removed from NRHP: April 18, 2006

Bethel Baptist Church, also known as First Baptist Church, Gresham Pioneer Church and Old First Baptist Church, was a church building located in Gresham, Oregon listed on the National Register of Historic Places. Built by Peter Engles in 1886, the church displayed Gothic Revival architecture and was constructed of brick and weatherboard.

The building was added to the National Register of Historic Places in 1982. The church burned on May 22, 2004 and was subsequently delisted from the National Register of Historic Places on April 18, 2006.

== See also ==
- National Register of Historic Places listings in Multnomah County, Oregon
- Religion in Oregon
