= Paul F. Murphy House =

Historic building in Portland, Oregon, U.S.

- U.S. National Register of Historic Places
- Portland Historic Landmark
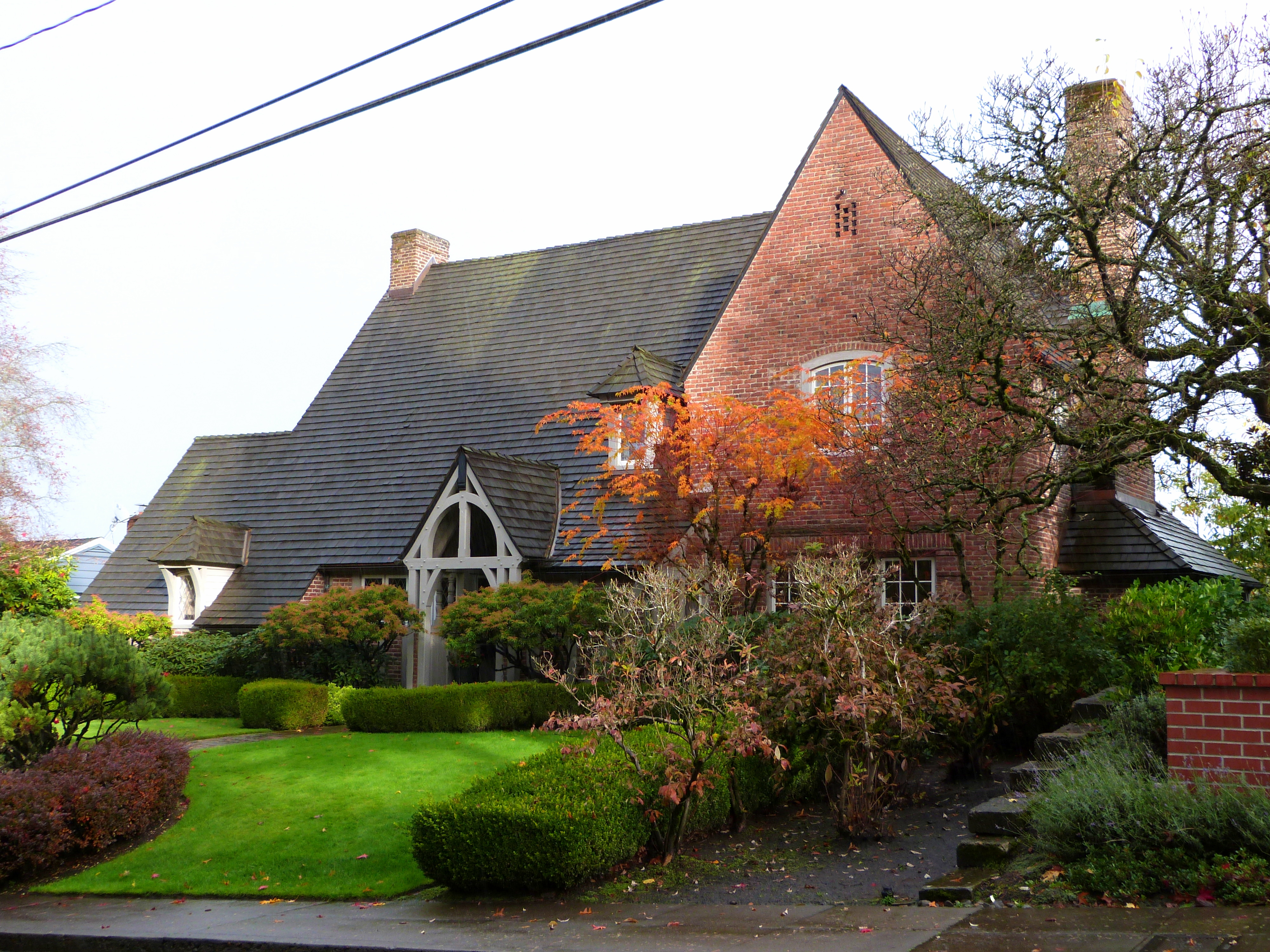
- The Paul F. Murphy House in 2013

- Location within Portland, Oregon Location within Oregon Location within the United States
- Location: 850 NW Powhatan Terrace; Portland, Oregon
- Coordinates: 45°31′44″N 122°42′43″W
- Area: 0.2 acres (0.081 ha)
- Built: 1934
- Architect: Richard Sundeleaf
- Architectural style: English Cottage
- NRHP reference No.: 91000138
- Added to NRHP: February 22, 1991

The Paul F. Murphy House is a house located in northwest Portland, Oregon, listed on the National Register of Historic Places.

== See also ==
- National Register of Historic Places listings in Northwest Portland, Oregon
