= Percy A. Smith House =

Historic house in Oregon, United States

- U.S. National Register of Historic Places
- Portland Historic Landmark
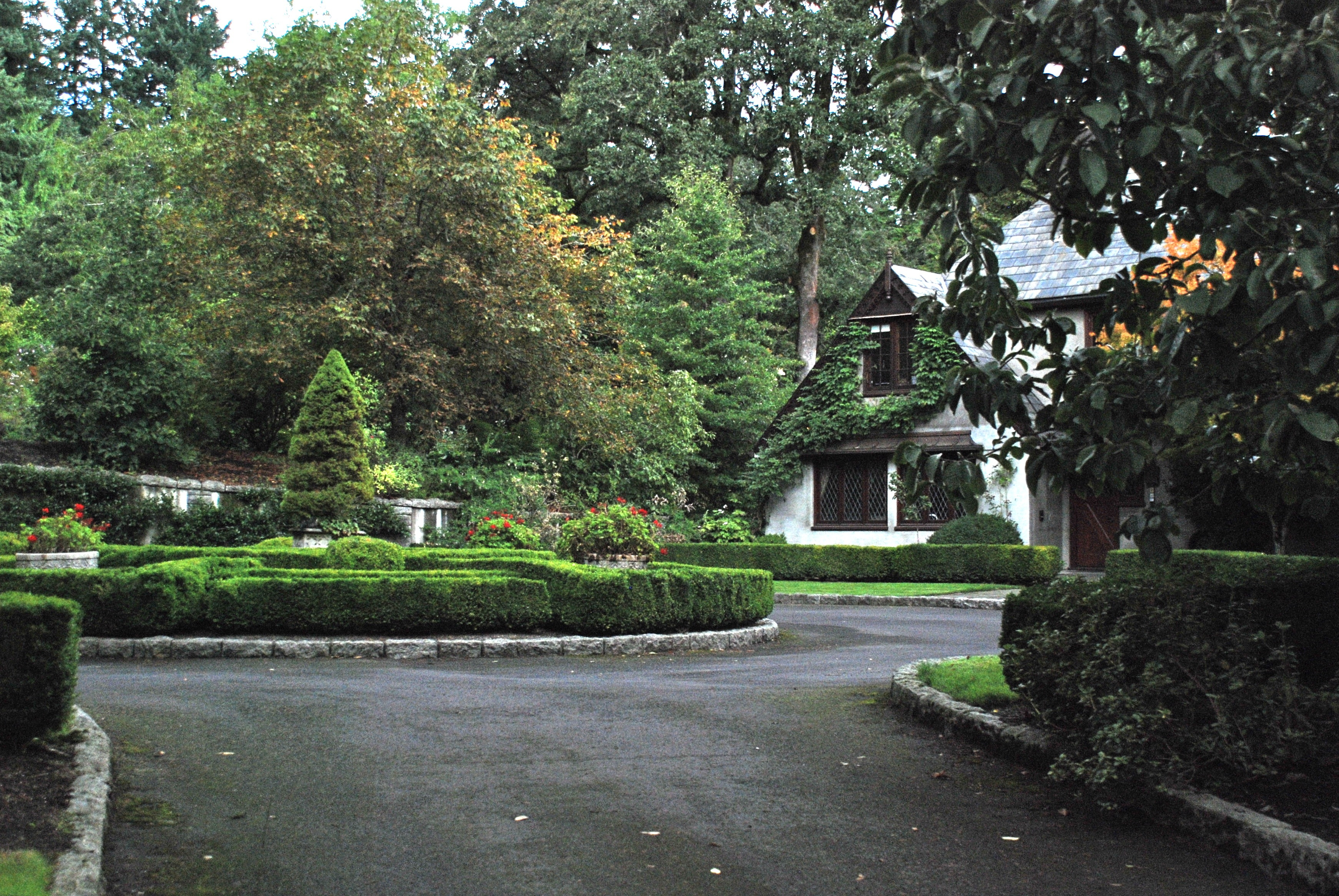
- The Smith House in 2013
- Location: 01837 SW Greenwood Road; Portland, Oregon
- Coordinates: 45°26′11″N 122°39′38″W
- Area: 3.4 acres (1.4 ha)
- Built: 1922
- Architect: Smith, Percy A.
- Architectural style: English Cottage
- NRHP reference No.: 91000135
- Added to NRHP: February 22, 1991

The Percy A. Smith House is a historic house located in the unincorporated Dunthorpe neighborhood of Multnomah County, Oregon, just south of the Portland municipal boundary. It is listed on the National Register of Historic Places.

== See also ==
- National Register of Historic Places listings in Multnomah County, Oregon
