= Handy Park =

Public park in Fairview, Oregon, U.S.

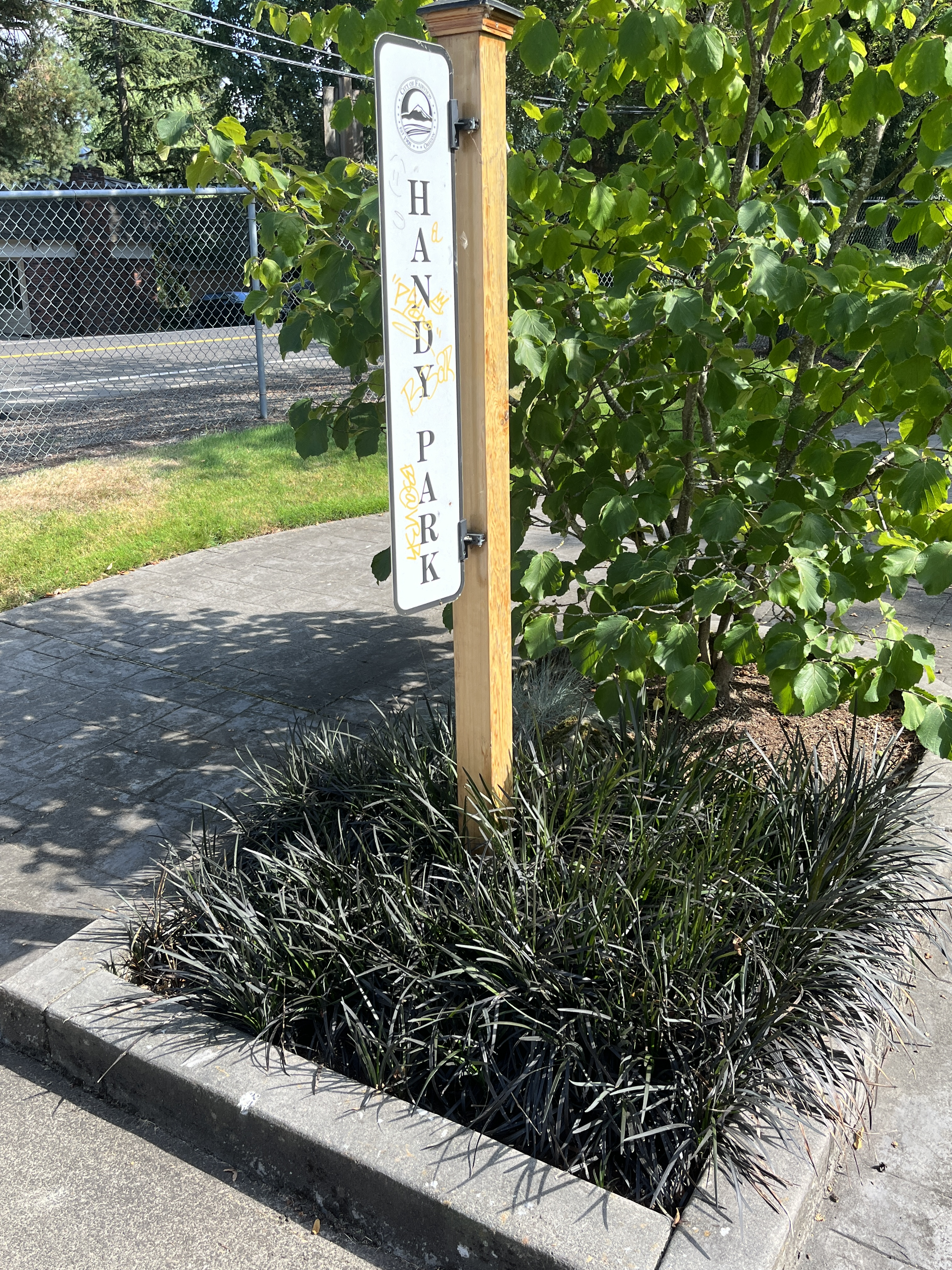
- Park sign, 2022
- Interactive map of Handy Park
- Location: Fairview, Oregon, U.S.
- Coordinates: 45°32′22″N 122°26′2″W

Handy Park (also known as Handy-Nechocokee Park or Ne-cha-co-kee/Handy Park) is a public park in Fairview, Oregon, United States. The park houses the Fairview City Jail.
