= Charles and Fae Olson House =

Historic house in Oregon, United States

- U.S. National Register of Historic Places
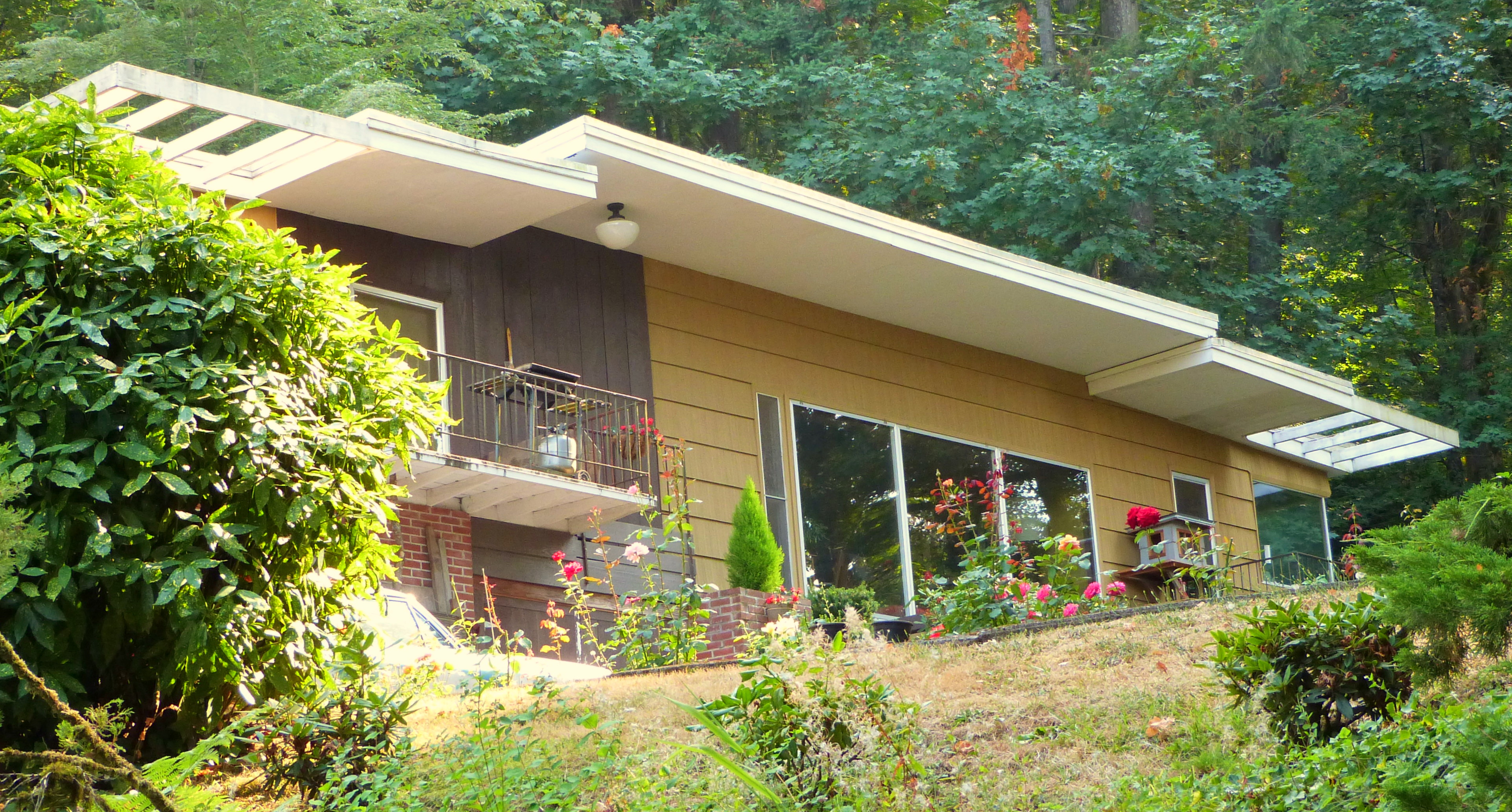
- The Olson House in 2015

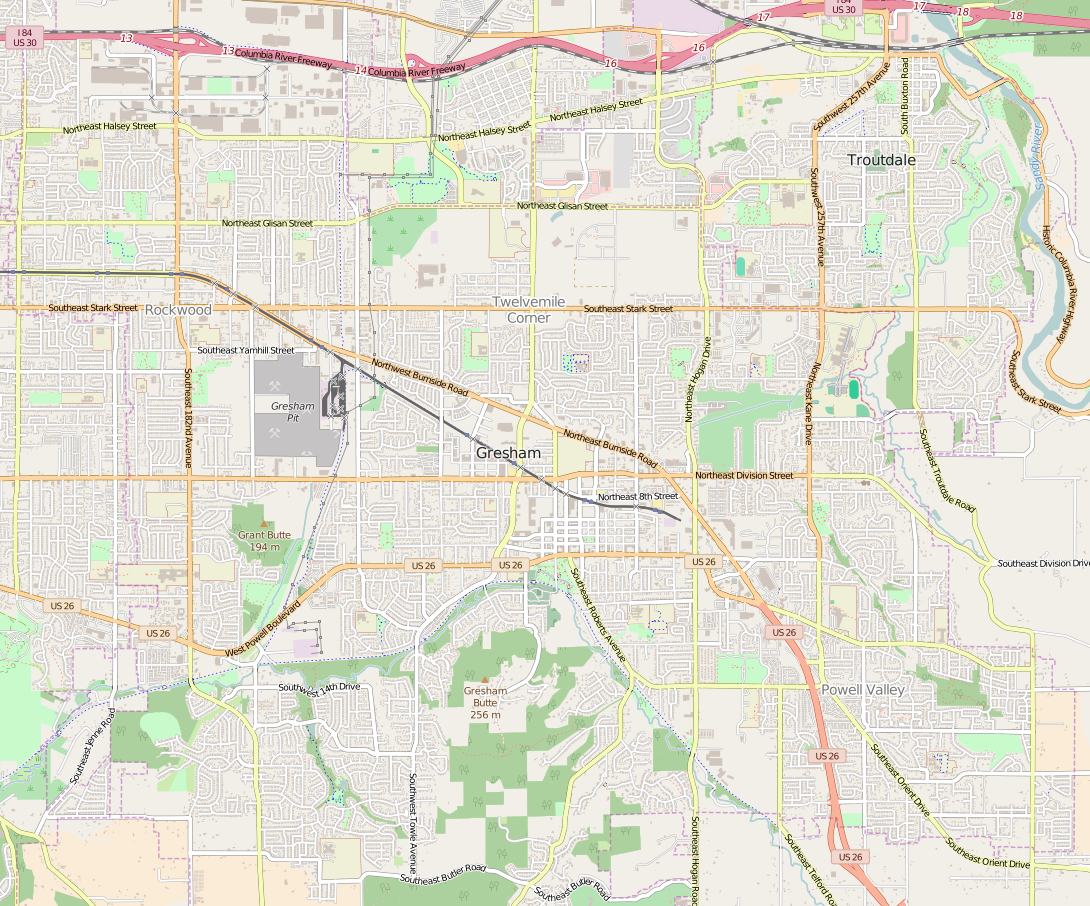
- Location within Gresham OR
- Location: 765 SW Walters Road; Gresham, Oregon
- Coordinates: 45°29′30″N 122°26′02″W
- Area: 1.5 acres (0.61 ha) (approx.)
- Built: 1946 (begun); 1957 (finished)
- Built by: Charles Olson
- Architect: Charles Olson
- Architectural style: Modern
- NRHP reference No.: 07000921
- Added to NRHP: September 7, 2007

The Charles and Fae Olson House is a historic house in Gresham, Oregon, United States. Designed and hand-built by the novice owner-occupant as his version of the "dream house" that sustained many men and women overseas during World War II, its modern styling embodies the breaks with tradition embraced by the generation returning from the war. The main outlines of the plan were developed during mail correspondence between Charles Olson and his wife Fae while he was serving in the Pacific, and many features are patterned on the books and magazines available to him. The Olsons' willingness to devote their own labor to its construction allowed them to avoid the constraints of commercial and government financing, which favored standardized suburban tract construction during the immediate postwar period, and to flexibly adapt to the material shortages of the time.

The house was added to the National Register of Historic Places in 2007.

== See also ==
- National Register of Historic Places listings in Multnomah County, Oregon
