= E. J. O'Donnell House =

House in Multnomah County, Oregon, U.S.

- U.S. National Register of Historic Places
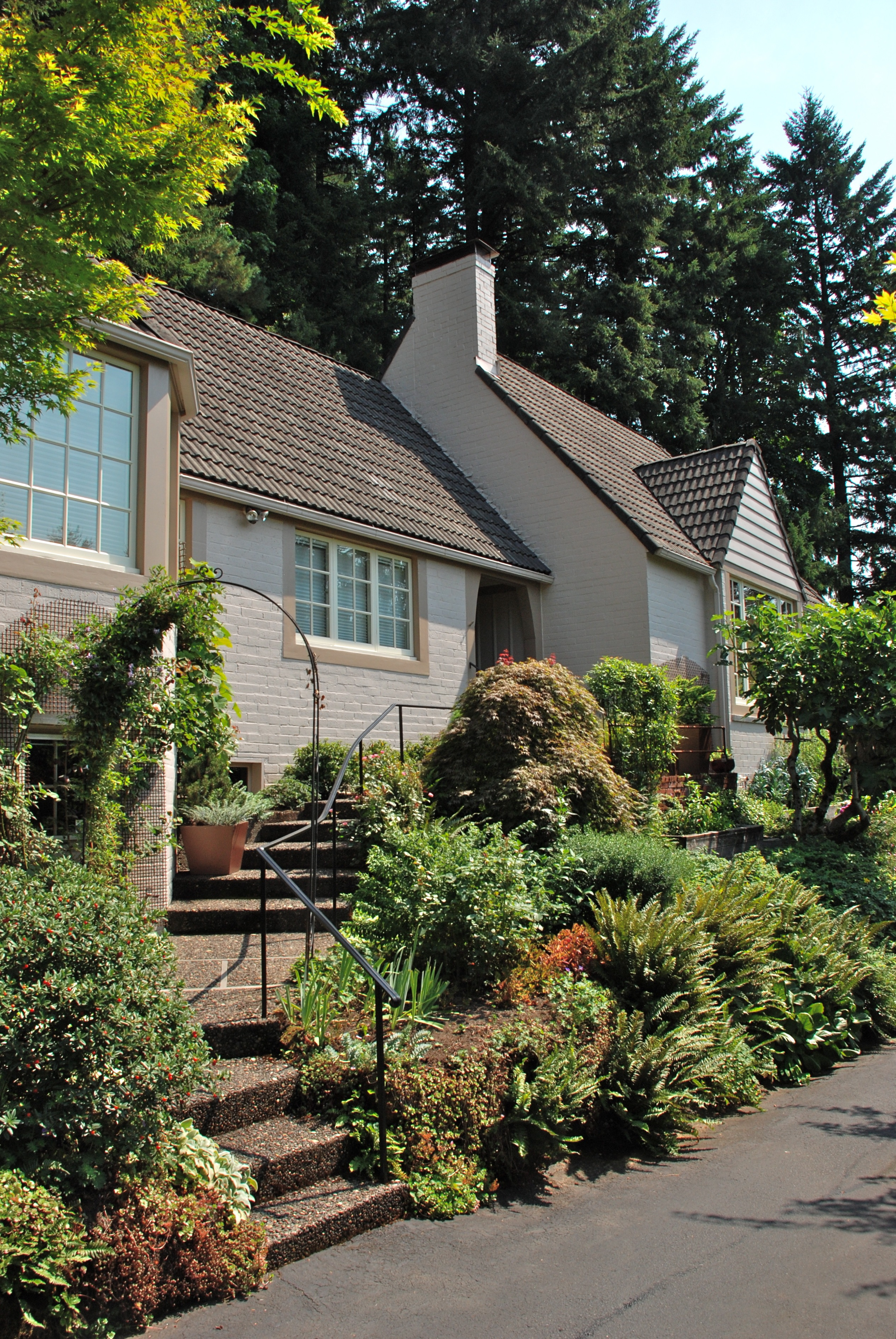
- The house's exterior in 2014

- Location within Portland, Oregon Location within the United States
- Location: 5535 SW Hewett Blvd. Portland, Oregon
- Coordinates: 45°30′16″N 122°44′1″W
- Area: 1 acre (0.40 ha)
- Built: 1940
- Architect: Richard Sundeleaf
- Architectural style: Late 19th and 20th Century Revivals, English Cottage/Norman Revival
- NRHP reference No.: 93001564
- Added to NRHP: January 28, 1994

The E. J. O'Donnell House in Multnomah County, Oregon, just outside the Portland municipal boundary, was designed in 1938 by architect Richard Sundeleaf for dairyman and cattle breeder Edward J. O'Donnell. It was completed in 1940.

The single-story house was designed to be wheelchair-accessible for a child of the O'Donnells'. It has a "multiplicity of steeply-pitched cross gables at the east end and a variegated exterior of brick, lapped weatherboards as gable cladding, and secondary siding of boards and molded battens." It has bays and projections on its faces, and on the northeast has a kitchen/utility wing and on the southwest has a garage/bedroom wing.

Its NRHP nomination describes that:

The house displays the essential qualities for which Sundeleaf's Arts and Crafts architecture is admired. Porches have heavy post and beam framing. Solid craftsmanship emphasizes interior wood paneling and trim. A square module is used for division of window space, including sidelights for view windows on which such premium is placed in Portland's west hills. Building volumes are stepped down to the landscape through sheltered terraces and projecting window bays. The architect brings forward from earlier projects (see Clarence Francis House) a rear gallery—an updated screens passage which in archetypical manor houses leads to private compartments from the great hall or circulation core.

It was listed on the National Register of Historic Places in 1994.

== See also ==
- National Register of Historic Places listings in Multnomah County, Oregon
