= Fairview City Jail =

Former jail in Fairview, Oregon, U.S.

- U.S. National Register of Historic Places
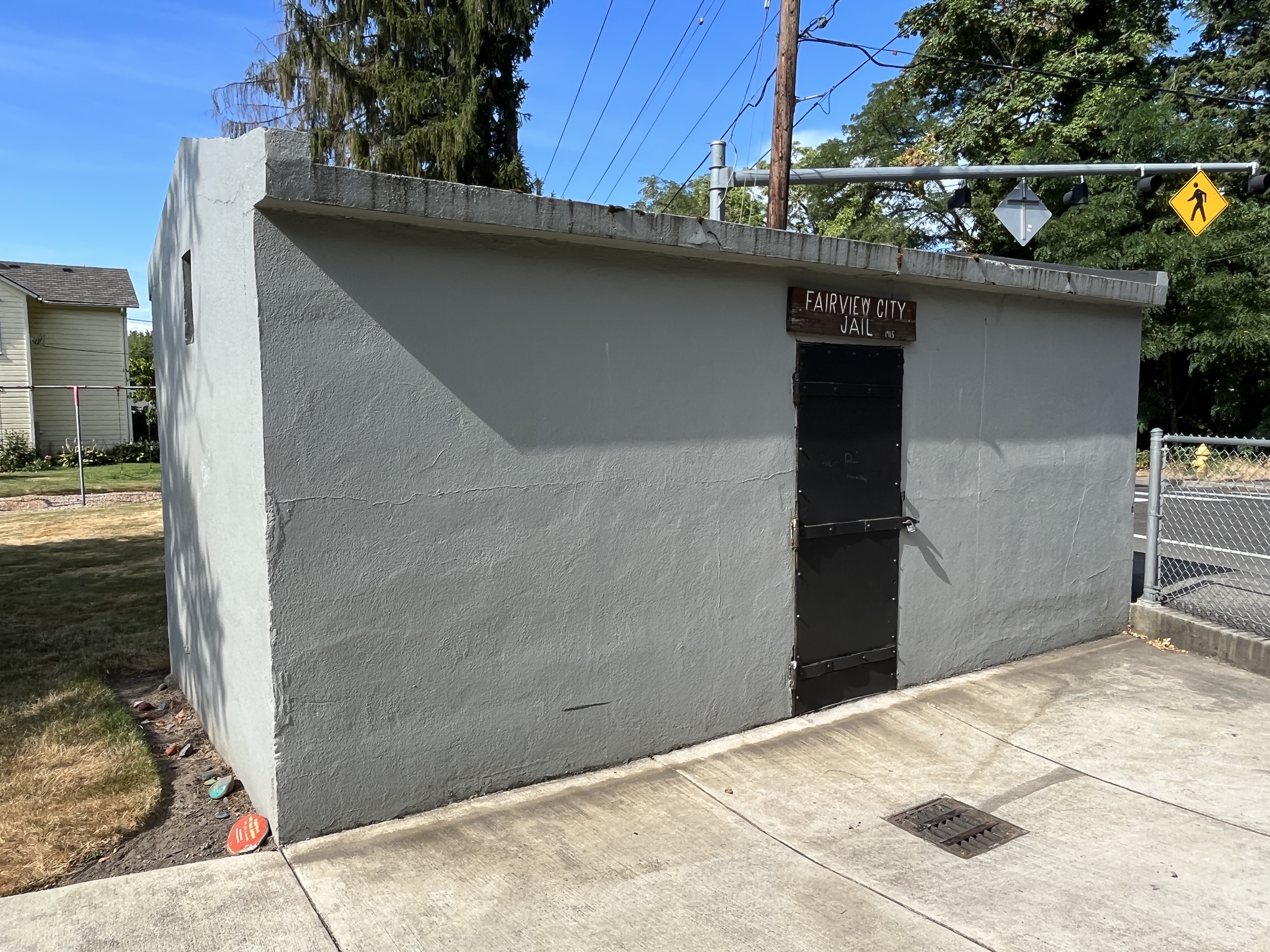
- The structure's exterior, 2022

- Location within Oregon Location within the United States
- Location: 120 1st St, Fairview, Oregon
- Coordinates: 45°32′22.1778″N 122°26′9.6714″W
- Area: less than one acre
- Built: 1915
- Built by: Citizens of Fairview
- NRHP reference No.: 16000290
- Added to NRHP: May 23, 2016

The Fairview City Jail is a former jail building located in Handy Park at 120 1st Street in Fairview, Oregon, in the United States. It was built in 1915, next to the old Fairview City Hall at 60 Main Street. It is a simple, rectangular, concrete building, 10 feet by 20 feet, with 8 foot high walls painted grey. It has a low-pitched concrete slab roof with shallow gable ends. It was added to the National Register of Historic Places in 2016.

== See also ==
- National Register of Historic Places listings in Multnomah County, Oregon
