= Andreas Graf House =

Historic house in Oregon, United States

- U.S. National Register of Historic Places
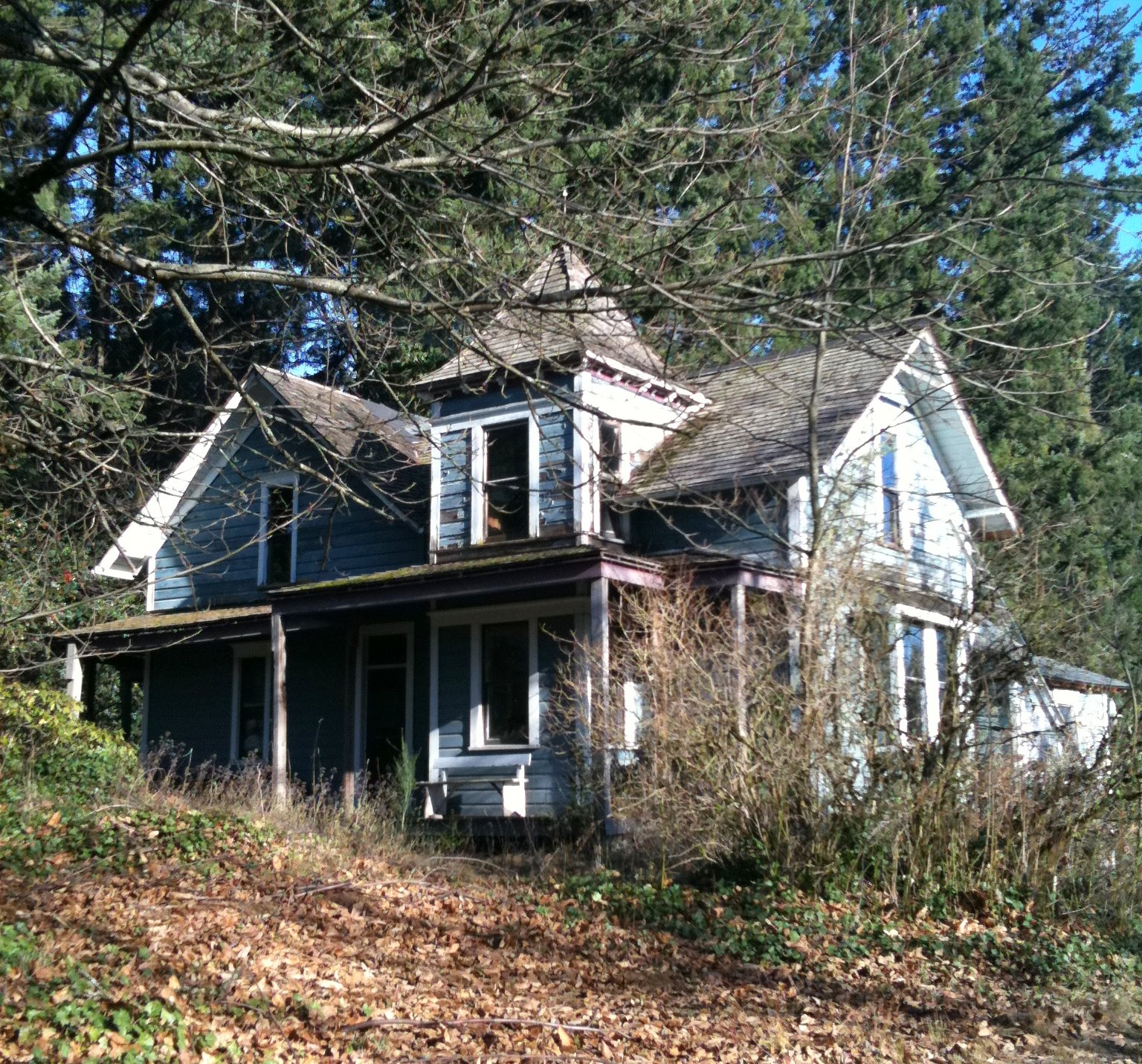
- The Graf House in 2009
- Location: 44222 SE Loudon Road; Corbett, Oregon
- Nearest city: Troutdale, Oregon
- Coordinates: 45°30′40″N 122°12′29″W
- Area: 1.55 acres (0.63 ha)
- Built: c. 1885, expanded c. 1891
- Built by: Andreas Graf
- Architectural style: Queen Anne
- NRHP reference No.: 80003356
- Added to NRHP: November 13, 1980

The Andreas Graf House is a historic residence in Corbett, Oregon, United States. It stands out as one of the very few Queen Anne style structures in its rural community. German immigrant Andreas Graf arrived in Oregon and staked his homestead claim in 1883, building his house in around 1885 using lumber he milled himself on the homestead. Originally designed in the Carpenter Gothic style, the house was expanded and transformed into the more fashionable Queen Anne style around 1891. Also in 1891, Graf received one of the area's earliest federal land patents for his homestead. Graf worked as a farmer and machinist, and as a homebuilder in Portland and Corbett. He also operated a threshing business and established one of Corbett's earliest schools on his land. He died in 1903.

The house was added to the National Register of Historic Places in 1980. The house remained in the Graf (later "Graff") family at least until 2014.

== See also ==
- National Register of Historic Places listings in Multnomah County, Oregon
