= Lewis H. Mills House (1929) =

House in Portland, Oregon, U.S.

- Location within Oregon Location within the United States
- Interactive map of Lewis H. Mills House
- Location: Portland

The Lewis H. Mills House, once located in Portland, Oregon, was listed on the National Register of Historic Places until 2010.

== See also ==
- National Register of Historic Places listings in Multnomah County, Oregon
