= Roy and Leola Gangware House =

Historic house in Oregon, United States

- U.S. National Register of Historic Places
- Portland Historic Landmark
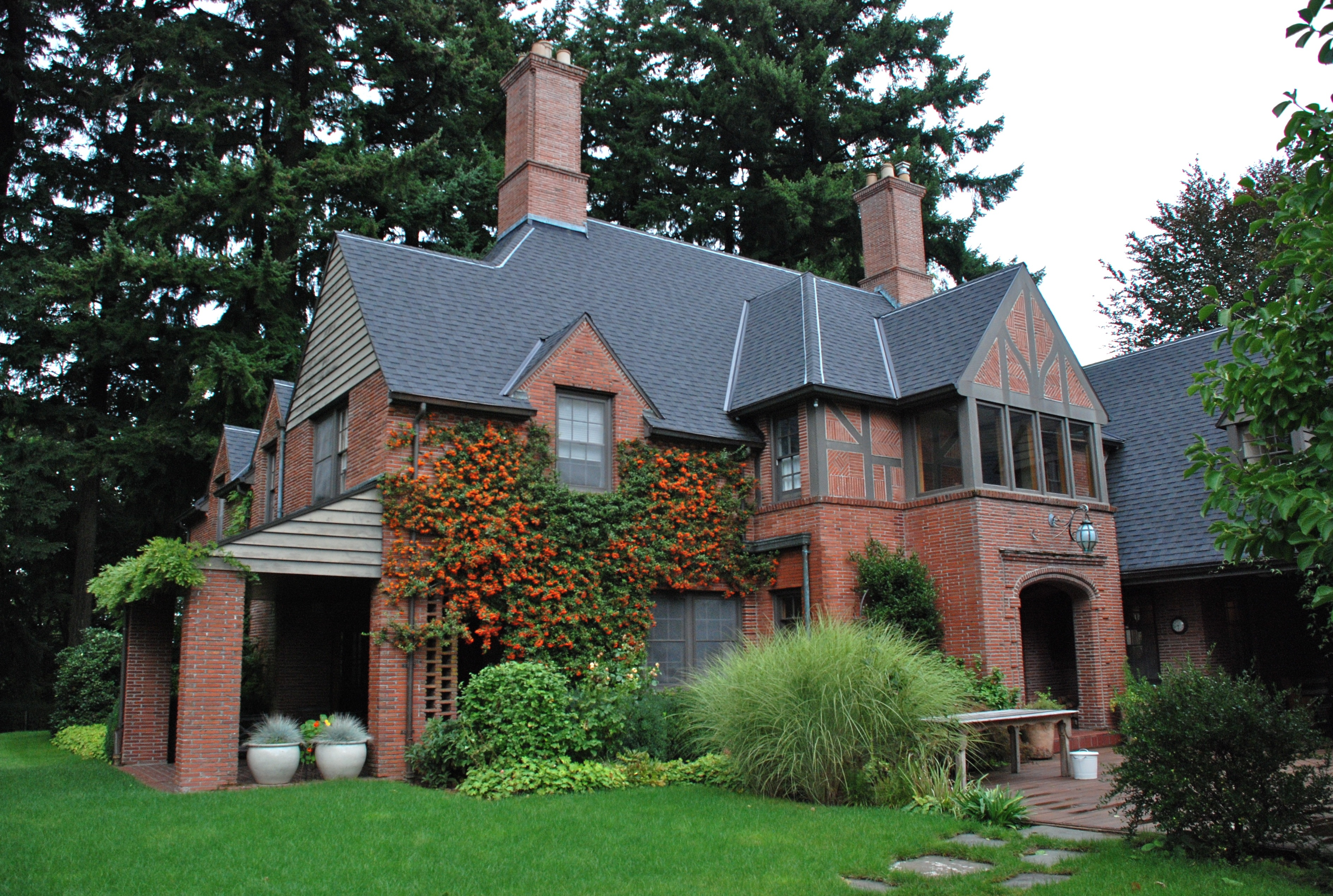
- The Gangware House in 2013
- Location: 4848 SW Humphrey Boulevard; Portland, Oregon
- Coordinates: 45°30′17″N 122°43′35″W
- Area: 2.8 acres (1.1 ha)
- Built: 1932
- Architect: Hemenway, Roscoe
- Architectural style: Tudor Revival
- NRHP reference No.: 90000284
- Added to NRHP: February 23, 1990

The Roy and Leola Gangware House, is a historic house in Multnomah County, Oregon, United States, just outside the Portland municipal boundary. It is listed on the National Register of Historic Places.

== See also ==
- National Register of Historic Places listings in Multnomah County, Oregon
