= Oregon Portland Cement Building =

Historic building in Portland, Oregon, U.S.

- U.S. National Register of Historic Places
- Portland Historic Landmark
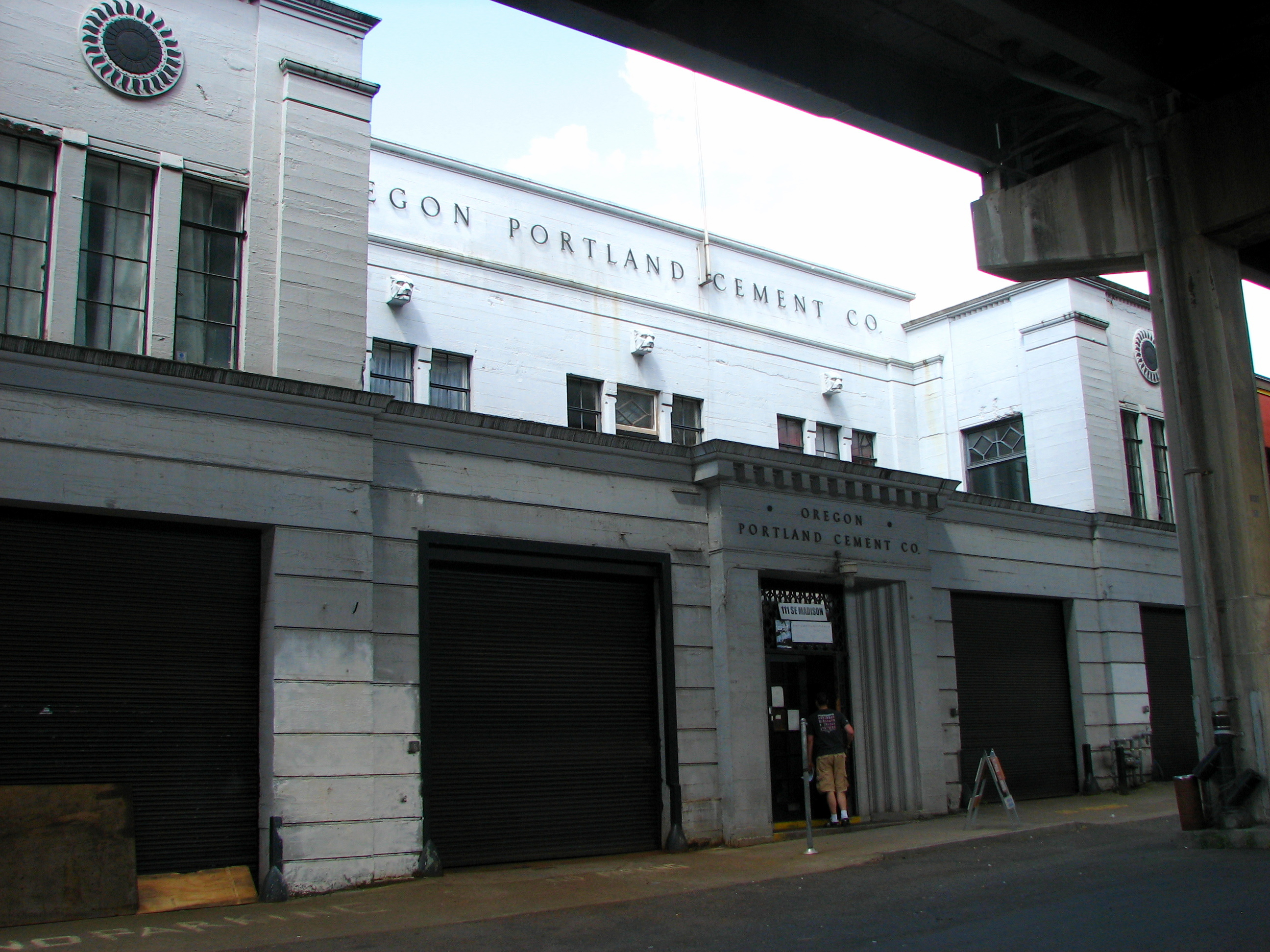
- Oregon Portland Cement Building in 2009

- Location within Portland, Oregon Location within Oregon Location within the United States
- Location: 111 SE Madison Street; Portland, Oregon, United States
- Coordinates: 45°30′47″N 122°39′52″W
- Built: 1929
- Architect: Richard Sundeleaf, Alaska P & H
- Architectural style: Late 19th And Early 20th Century American Movements, Classical Revival
- MPS: Portland Eastside MPS
- NRHP reference No.: 89000114
- Added to NRHP: March 8, 1989

The Oregon Portland Cement Building is a building in southeast Portland, Oregon, United States listed on the National Register of Historic Places.

== See also ==
- National Register of Historic Places listings in Southeast Portland, Oregon
