= Joseph Wilcox House =

Historical building

- U.S. Historic district – Contributing property
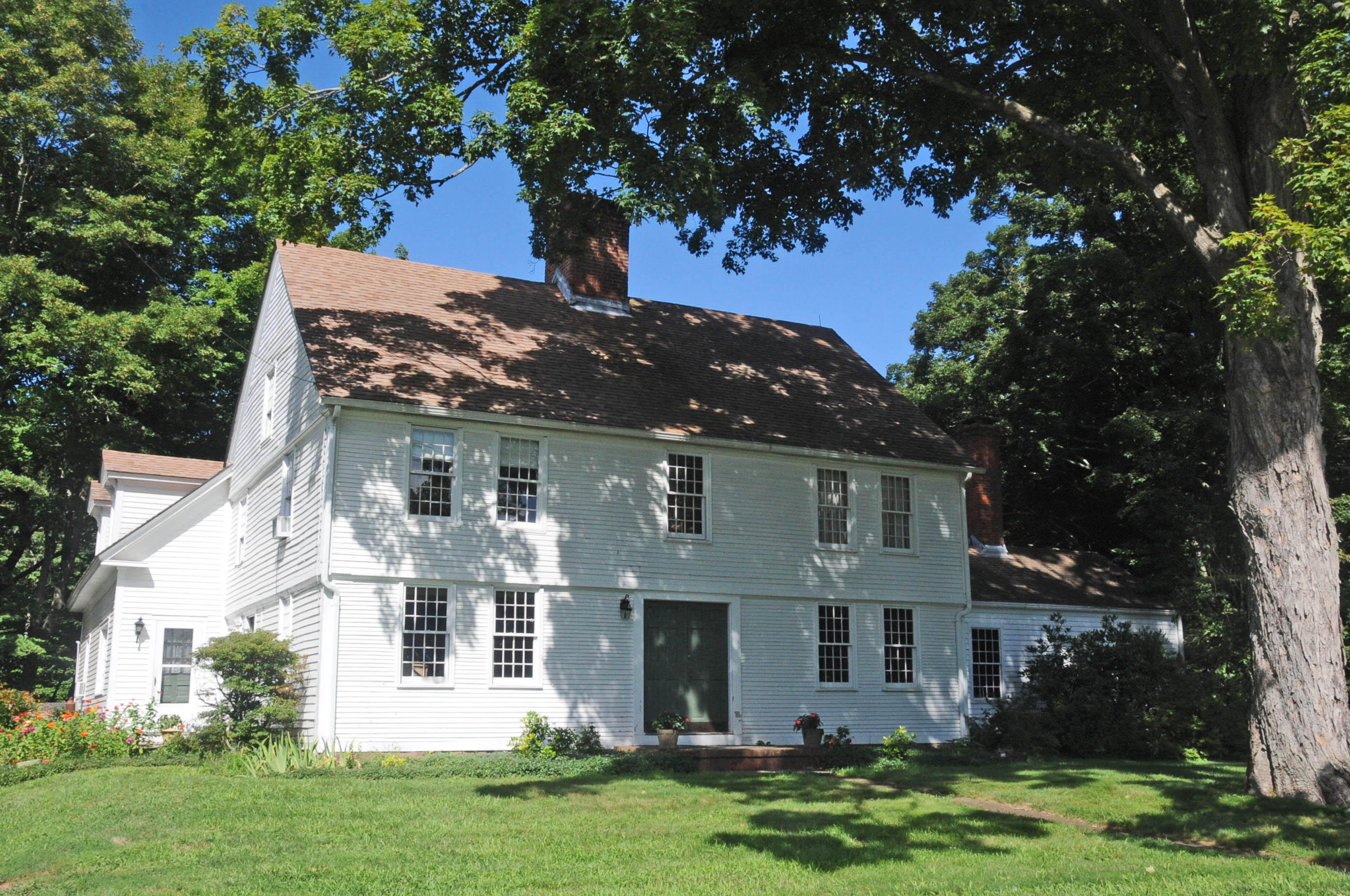

- Location within Connecticut
- Location: 227 Atkins Street, Middletown, Connecticut
- Coordinates: 41.57199°N 72.73932°W
- Area: 3 acres (1.2 ha)
- Built: c.1774, c.1812, c.1870
- Part of: Highland Historic District
- Designated CP: June 28, 1982

The Joseph Wilcox House is an historic home located on Atkins Street in the Highland Historic District of Middletown, Connecticut.

== History ==
It was built in 1774 by Joseph Wilcox, one of the earliest settlers in Westfield, with additions constructed in 1812 and 1870, and the house remained in the Wilcox family until the 1970s. It features a traditional New England center-chimney colonial design and is, according to the National Register of Historic Places, “one of the finest and most complete interiors in the town. Its many original features constitute an outstanding historic resource: the paneling, pilasters, cupboards, and grained wainscot illustrate the breadth of early American craftsmanship.”

The wing containing a summer kitchen with attached buttery and pantry was added in 1812 and features original hand-painted trompe l’oeil wainscotting and a fireplace with a beehive oven. A silver forge in the basement of the 1812 wing recalls the Wilcox family history of silversmithing and metallurgy; Joseph Wilcox’s grandson, Horace Wilcox, started his career peddling tin ware from the basement under the house’s summer kitchen but went on to found the Meriden Britannia Silver Company and was almost single-handedly responsible for Meriden’s nickname “The Silver City” (3). The ell was added in 1870 and includes a room that was used as overflow housing for hotel guests from a resort across the street (since demolished) and factory workers from the nearby Wilcox silver manufactory. The northeast parlor’s original features include a corner shell cupboard, paneled wainscoting, an elaborately paneled fireplace wall, five-panel doors with strap hinges, and the original wide floorboards. The nearby Wilcox Cemetery contains the graves of generations of Wilcoxes from the eighteenth through twenty-first centuries.

The house was on the market in 2012 and again in 2022, and was sold June 8, 2022.

== Significance ==
It was deemed one of the best examples of a central-chimney plan house in Middletown.

The house is a contributing building in the historic district, which was listed on the National Register in 1982.

It was highlighted in a short New York Times article in 1982.
