= John V. G. Posey House =

House in Multnomah County, Oregon, U.S.

- U.S. National Register of Historic Places
- U.S. Historic district – Contributing property
- Location within Oregon
- Location: 2107 SW Greenwood Rd, Portland, Oregon
- Coordinates: 45.435924°N 122.657049°W
- Built: 1923
- Architect: Ellis F. Lawrence
- Architectural style: 20th Century Colonial
- Website: "John V. G. Posey House".
- NRHP reference No.: 90001517
- Added to NRHP: October 17, 1990

The John V. G. Posey House, located in Portland, Multnomah County, Oregon, is listed on the National Register of Historic Places.

== See also ==
- National Register of Historic Places listings in Multnomah County, Oregon
