= Whidden–Kerr House and Garden =

Historic house in Oregon, United States

- U.S. National Register of Historic Places
- Portland Historic Landmark
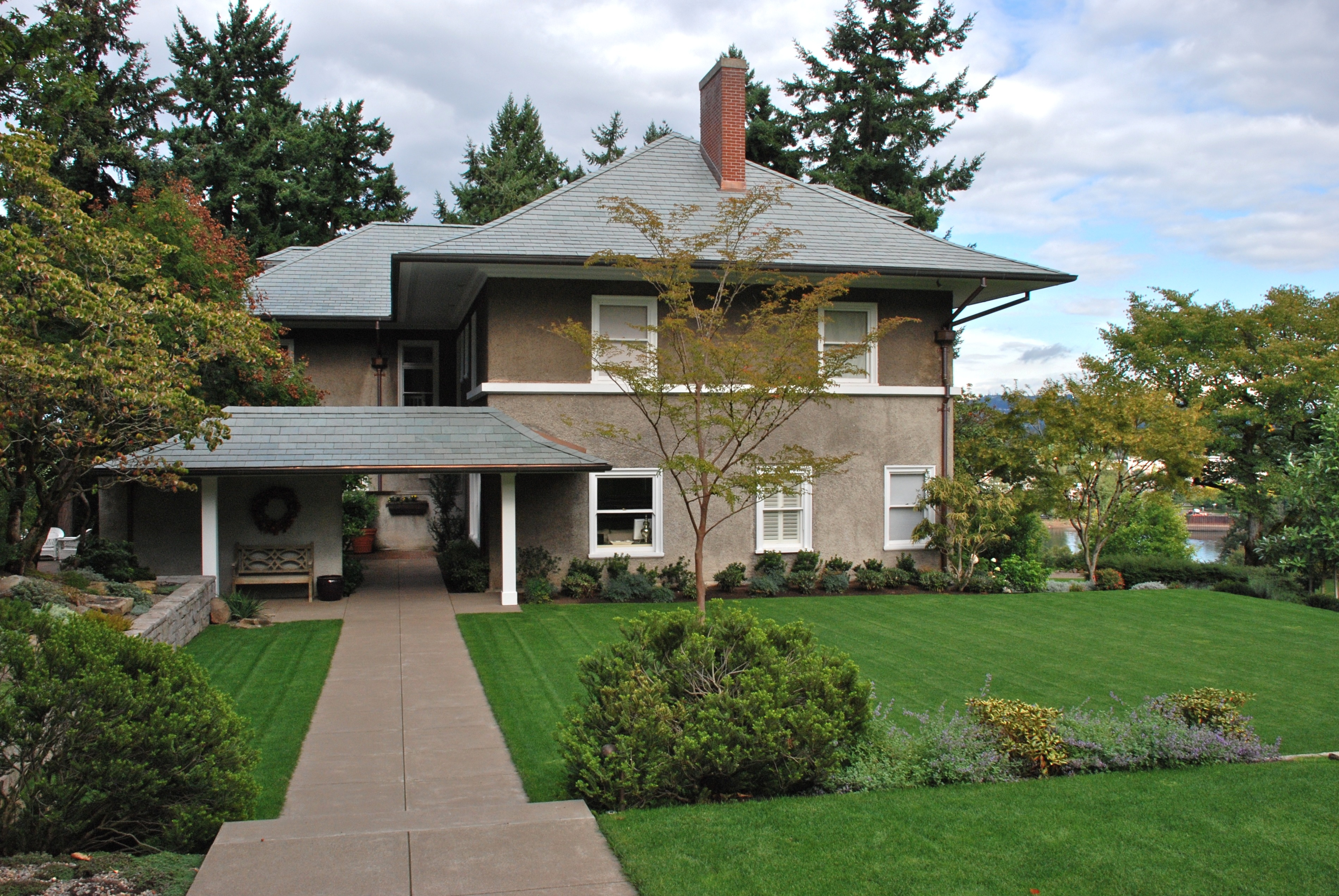
- The Whidden–Kerr House and Garden in 2013
- Location: 11648 SW Military Lane; Portland, Oregon, U.S.
- Coordinates: 45°26′29″N 122°39′08″W
- Area: 1.19 acres (0.48 ha)
- Built: 1901
- Architect: Whidden & Lewis
- Architectural style: Prairie School
- NRHP reference No.: 88001039
- Added to NRHP: October 13, 1988

The Whidden–Kerr House and Garden, also known as High Hatch Estate, is a historic property located in the unincorporated communities of Riverwood and Dunthorpe in Multnomah County, Oregon, south of Portland and north of Lake Oswego, Oregon. William M. Whidden of Whidden & Lewis designed the house in 1901, to be his own residence, and it was built the same year. Whidden and his family lived in the house until 1911, when he sold it to businessman Thomas Kerr Sr. (1896–1925). It later passed to Kerr's son, Thomas Kerr Jr., and ultimately remained with the Kerr family until 1987.

The house is the "best expression" of Prairie School architecture by Whidden & Lewis, one of Portland's most prominent architectural firms of the period. A separate carriage house, now in use as a garage, is included as a contributing feature in the historic designation. The property includes a formal garden, which was "further developed by Kerr and his wife, the former Mabel Macleay", after Kerr acquired the estate in 1911. The site overlooks the Willamette River.

The property was listed on the National Register of Historic Places in 1988.

== See also ==
- National Register of Historic Places listings in Multnomah County, Oregon
