= Dr. Herbert H. Hughes House =

Historic house in Oregon, United States

- U.S. National Register of Historic Places
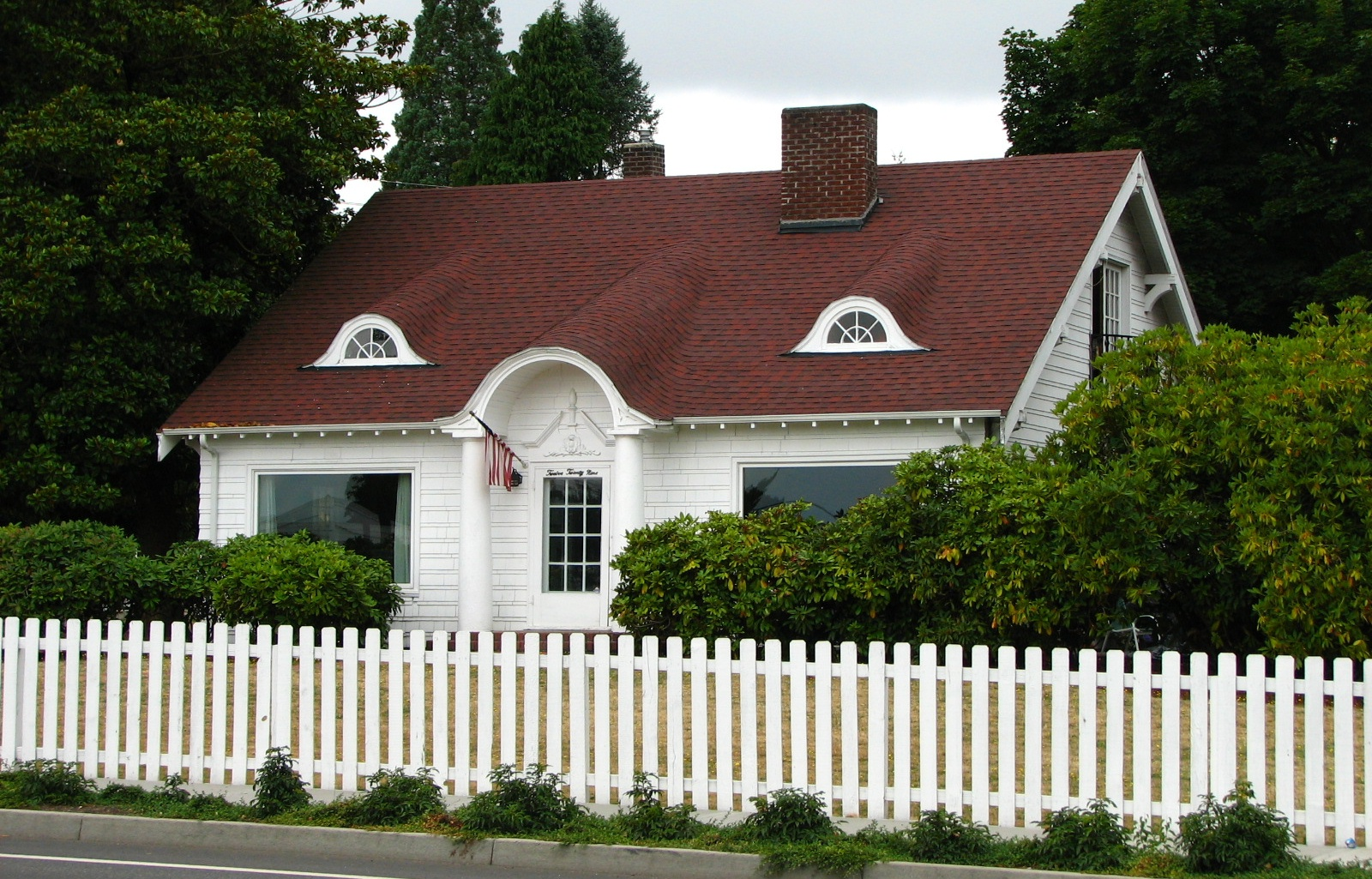

- Location within Oregon Location within the United States
- Location: 1229 W Powell Boulevard, Gresham, Oregon
- Area: 0.38 acres (0.15 ha)
- Built: 1922
- Architect: Frank Gibbs
- Architectural style: Colonial, Vernacular
- NRHP reference No.: 01000932
- Added to NRHP: September 5, 2001

The Dr. Herbert H. Hughes House is a historic house located at 1229 West Powell Boulevard in Gresham, Oregon.

== Description and history ==
The 1 1/2-story house was built in 1922 and was designed by architect Frank Gibbs. It displays characteristics of the Colonial Style in its symmetry, side facing gable roof, large brick chimney, fanlight eyebrow dormers, central arched entrance porch, massive Doric porch posts, multi-pane windows, the decorative broken pediment over the wide multi-pane entrance door, and wood shingle siding.

It was listed on the National Register of Historic Places on September 5, 2001.

== See also ==
- National Register of Historic Places listings in Multnomah County, Oregon
