= William Gedamke House =

Historic house in Oregon, United States

- U.S. National Register of Historic Places
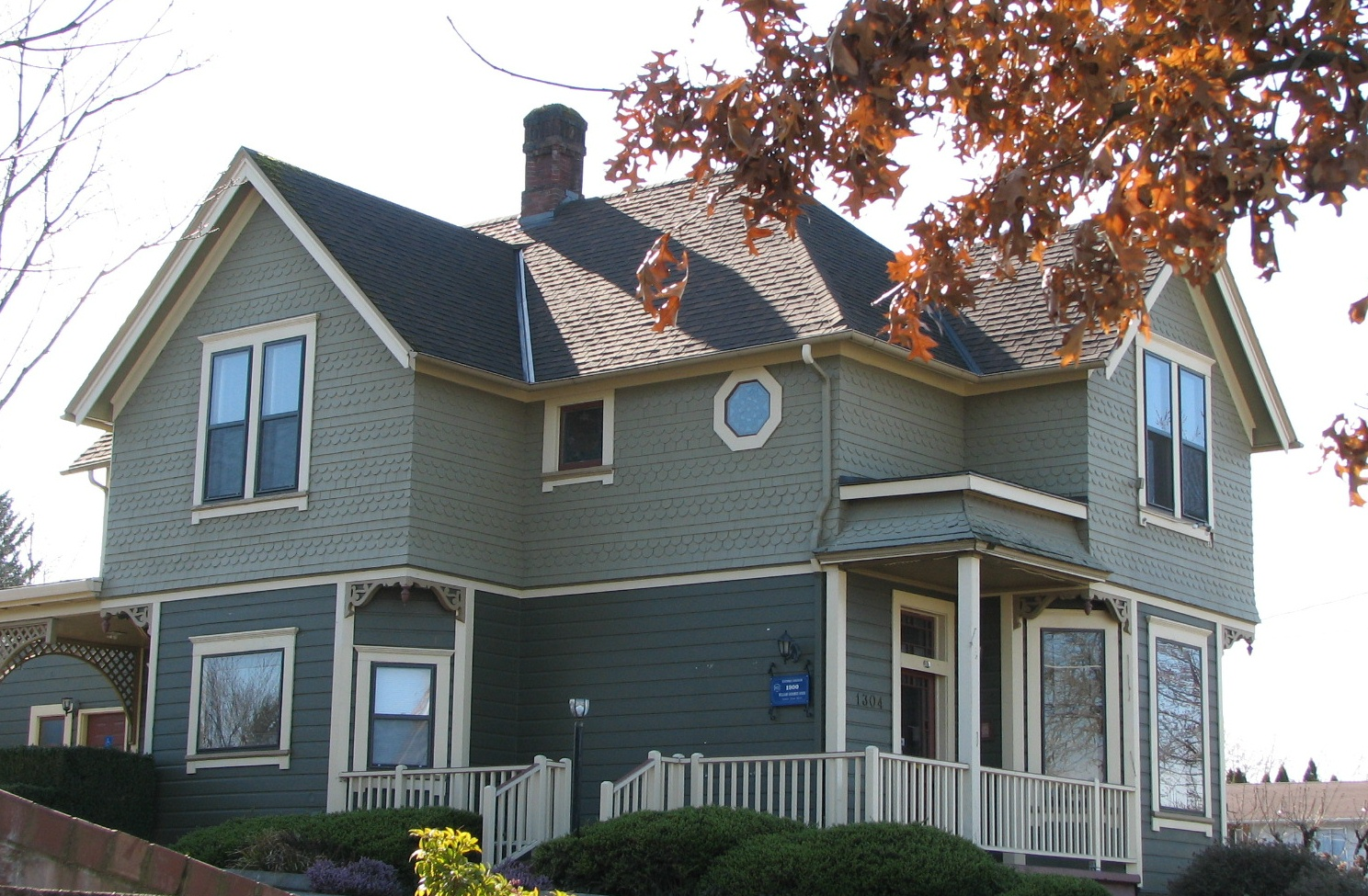
- The Gedamke House in 2008

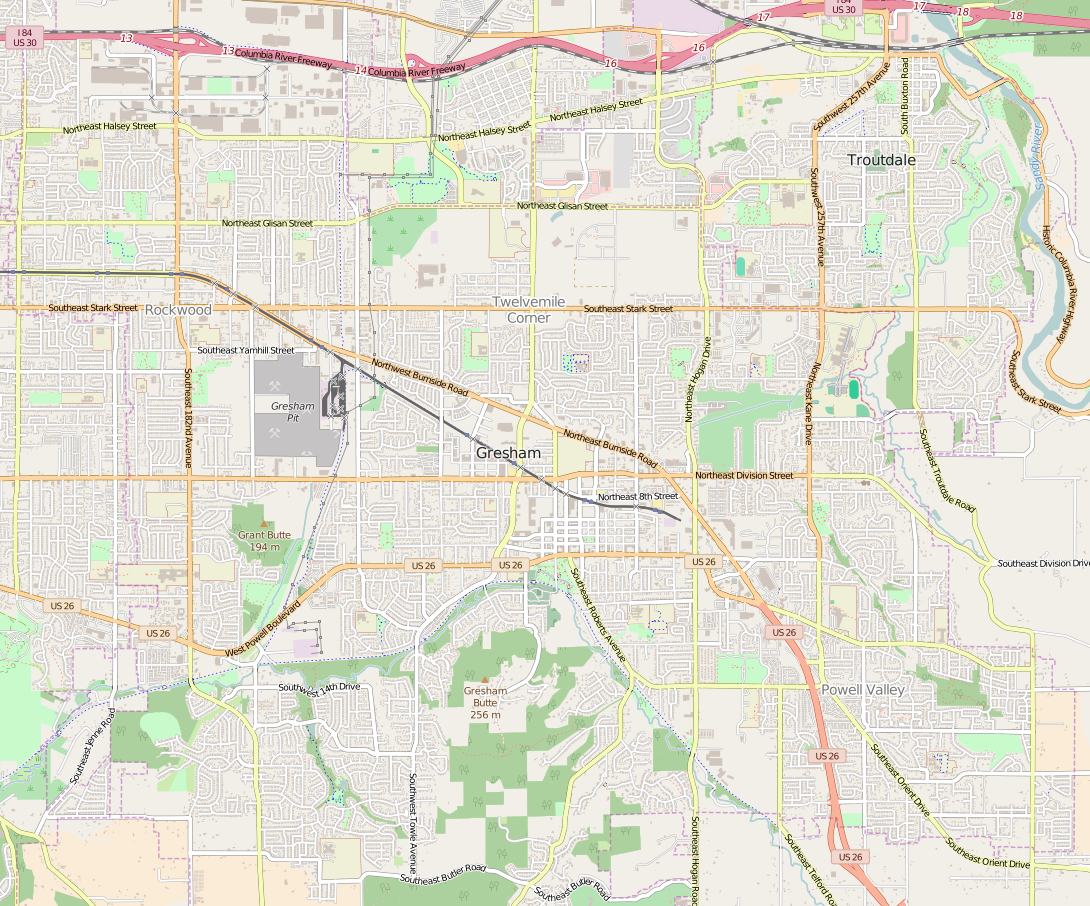
- Location within Gresham OR
- Location: 1304 E. Powell Boulevard; Gresham, Oregon
- Coordinates: 45°29′52″N 122°25′06″W
- Area: 0.42 acres (0.17 ha)
- Built: ca. 1900
- Architect: George F. Barber (via pattern book)
- Architectural style: Queen Anne
- NRHP reference No.: 89001970
- Added to NRHP: November 13, 1989

The William Gedamke House is a historic residence in Gresham, Oregon, United States. Prominently located near Gresham's original business core, it is one of the finest expressions of the Queen Anne style in the city. It was constructed circa 1900, about the time the first interurban trains reached Gresham from Portland. The design was based on a widely circulated 1891 mail-order plan book by George F. Barber. (Note: Specifically, the house was patterned after Design No. 21 in: Barber, George F. (1891), The Cottage Souvenir No. 2: Containing One Hundred and Twenty Original Designs in Cottage and Detail Architecture, Knoxville, Tennessee: S. B. Newman & Co., OCLC 18207839.)

The house was adapted for commercial use starting in 1985. It was added to the National Register of Historic Places in 1989.

== See also ==
- National Register of Historic Places listings in Multnomah County, Oregon
