= Dyre and Maria Amundsen House =

Historic house in Utah, United States

- U.S. National Register of Historic Places
- The Amundsen House in 2026

- Location within Utah Location within the United States
- Location: 307 E. Winchester St., Murray, Utah
- Coordinates: 40°38′00″N 111°52′54″W
- NRHP reference No.: 15000131
- Added to NRHP: April 6, 2015

The Dyre and Maria Amundsen House, at 307 E. Winchester St. in Murray, Utah, was listed on the National Register of Historic Places in 2015.

Dyre was from Norway. He built an adobe house, then later a brick one.
