= Roy E. and Hildur L. Amundsen House =

Historic house in Oregon, United States

- U.S. National Register of Historic Places
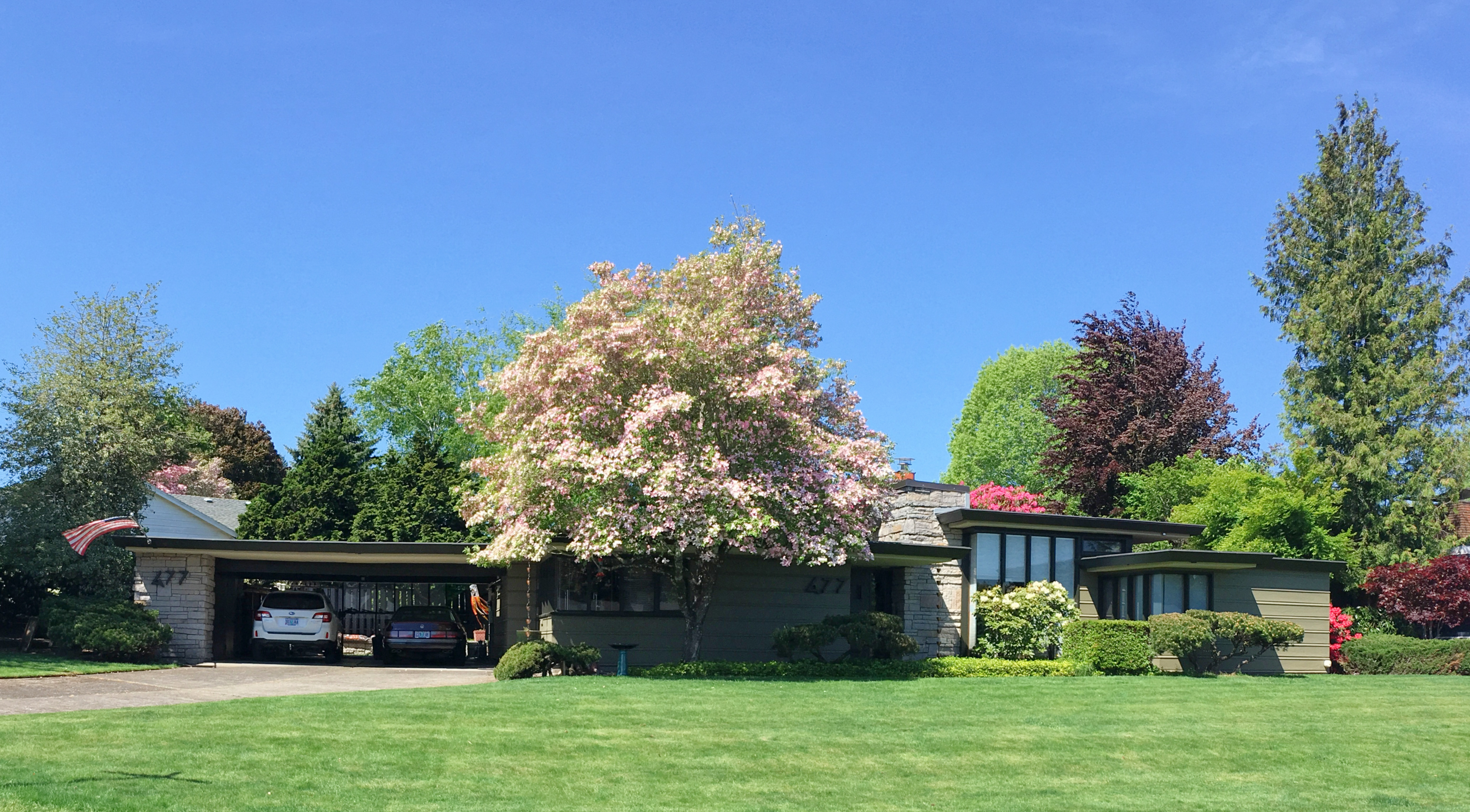
- The house in 2019

- Location within the United States Location within Oregon
- Location: 477 NW Overlook Avenue; Gresham, Oregon
- Coordinates: 45°30′03″N 122°26′34″W
- Area: 0.32 acres (0.13 ha)
- Built: 1961
- Built by: Harold Amundsen, Hans B. Grevstad
- Architect: Harold Amundsen (designer), Burton J. Goodrich and Barney E. Grevstad (consulting architects)
- Architectural style: Modern/Wrightian
- NRHP reference No.: 100004161
- Added to NRHP: July 15, 2019

The Roy E. and Hildur L. Amundsen House is a historic house in Gresham, Oregon, United States. Built in 1961 in a mid-century neighborhood, it is a highly intact example of a home designed in the style of Frank Lloyd Wright. An almost complete expression of Wright's principles for Usonian homes, it was designed by Harold Amundsen, the son of the original owners, while he was an architecture student at the University of Oregon, and hand-built by him and his grandfather Hans B. Grevstad. Consulting architects included Barney E. Grevstad, Harold's uncle who was a successful Seattle architect with numerous works in the Modern style, and Burton J. Goodrich, one of Wright's former Taliesin apprentices.

The house was entered on the National Register of Historic Places in 2019.

== See also ==
- National Register of Historic Places listings in Multnomah County, Oregon
