= Richard Sundeleaf =

American architect (1900-1987)

- Born: Richard Wilhelm Sundeleaf; February 8, 1900; Portland, Oregon
- Died: March 8, 1987 (aged 87); Lake Oswego, Oregon
- Occupation: Architect
- Spouse: Mildred Sundeleaf (1925–1987)
- Children: 2
- Practice: A. E. Doyle (1923–1924); Sutton and Whitney (1924–1928); Sole practice (1928–1980s)

Richard Wilhelm Sundeleaf (February 8, 1900 – March 8, 1987) was an American architect from Portland, Oregon, United States. A number of the buildings he designed are listed on the U.S. National Register of Historic Places.

== Early life and education ==
Sundeleaf was born in Portland's Goose Hollow neighborhood in 1900, and moved at age 6 to a neighborhood just north of Sellwood that was then known as City View Park. After graduating from Washington High School in 1918 he attended the University of Oregon's School of Architecture, in Eugene, graduating in 1923. He trained in the Beaux Arts style of traditional design.

== Career ==
After graduation, Sundeleaf returned to Portland. He began working for the firm of A. E. Doyle in 1923 and remained with Doyle for a year. He then worked for four years with the firm of Sutton and Whitney. After working for other architecture firms, he decided to open his own firm in 1928. During the Great Depression, he worked for the Historic American Buildings Survey. During this time he became known for his imaginative work in industrial architecture. He combined his decorative training with a rugged functionalism in a series of distinctive warehouses and offices. In the 1940s, his style changed somewhat when he became a proponent of the Streamline Moderne style, "in which the spirit of the machine age and the concepts of aerodynamics shaped the design of the building", The Oregonian wrote in its obituary of Sundeleaf.

He designed numerous residential and public buildings around Portland. Sundeleaf carried out several projects for Portland-based Jantzen Knitting Mills, including design of a new headquarters building and factory building in Portland, as well as buildings in Australia and England.

In 1935, Sundeleaf designed a Tudor-style English cottage for the University of Oregon chapter of Chi Psi in Eugene, Oregon. The Chi Psi Fraternity House was listed on the National Register of Historic Places (NRHP) in 1993. Many of Sundeleaf's English cottages would be constructed in suburban Portland.

Sundeleaf lived in Lake Oswego, Oregon, from 1940 until his death, and he designed many homes in that area. One of the latter, the Dr. Walter Black House, is listed on the NRHP. Around 1930, Jantzen Knitting Mills co-founder Carl Jantzen also commissioned Sundeleaf to design his home in Oswego (now Lake Oswego), and the now-NRHP-listed Carl C. Jantzen Estate used Sundeleaf's designs for its boathouse and bridge. Sundeleaf also designed the NRHP-listed 1934 Paul F. Murphy House, in Northwest Portland.

== Personal ==
With his wife, Mildred, to whom he was married from 1925 until his death, Sundeleaf also owned a 160-acre (65 ha) ranch in southwestern Montana, acquired in 1956.

Sundeleaf died on March 8, 1987, at his home in Lake Oswego. His career included over 3000 projects.

== Memorials ==
In 2013, the City of Lake Oswego named a new park at 120 State Street Sundeleaf Plaza, in honor of Richand Sundeleaf.

== Works ==
=== Residential ===
- Dr. Walter Black House, 1125 Maple St., Lake Oswego, Oregon, NRHP-listed
- Chi Psi Fraternity House, 1018 Hilyard St., Eugene, Oregon, NRHP-listed
- Clarence E. Francis House, 9717 SE. Cambridge Ln., Milwaukie, Oregon, NRHP-listed
- Carl C. Jantzen Estate's boathouse (c. 1930), 1850 N. Shore Rd., Lake Oswego, Oregon, NRHP-listed
- Paul F. Murphy House (1934), 850 NW. Powhatan Terr., Portland, Oregon, NRHP-listed
- E. J. O'Donnell House, 5535 SW. Hewett Blvd., Portland, NRHP-listed

=== Commercial and public buildings ===
- Oregon Portland Cement Building (1929), 111 SE Madison, Portland, NRHP-listed
- Headquarters of Jantzen (Portland), 1929; and British headquarters of Jantzen in London, England, 1933
- Mailwell Envelope Co., 1931
- Fliedner Building remodel, 1931
- Woodbury and Co. warehouse, 1939
- Bearing Service Co. building, 1944
- General Co. building (now Dynagraphics Inc.), 1945
- Francis and Hopkins Motors showroom (which later became the University Station Post Office), 1949
- The original Oregon Museum of Science and Industry building, 1955
- Portland Medical Center (a conversion of the 1929 Eastern Building, a former department store at SW 10th and Washington), 1957
- Wilson-Chambers Mortuary (1932), aka "Little Chapel of the Chimes", 430 N. Killingsworth St., Portland, NRHP-listed
