= Chi Psi Fraternity House (Eugene, Oregon) =

Historic structure in Eugene, Oregon, US

- U.S. National Register of Historic Places
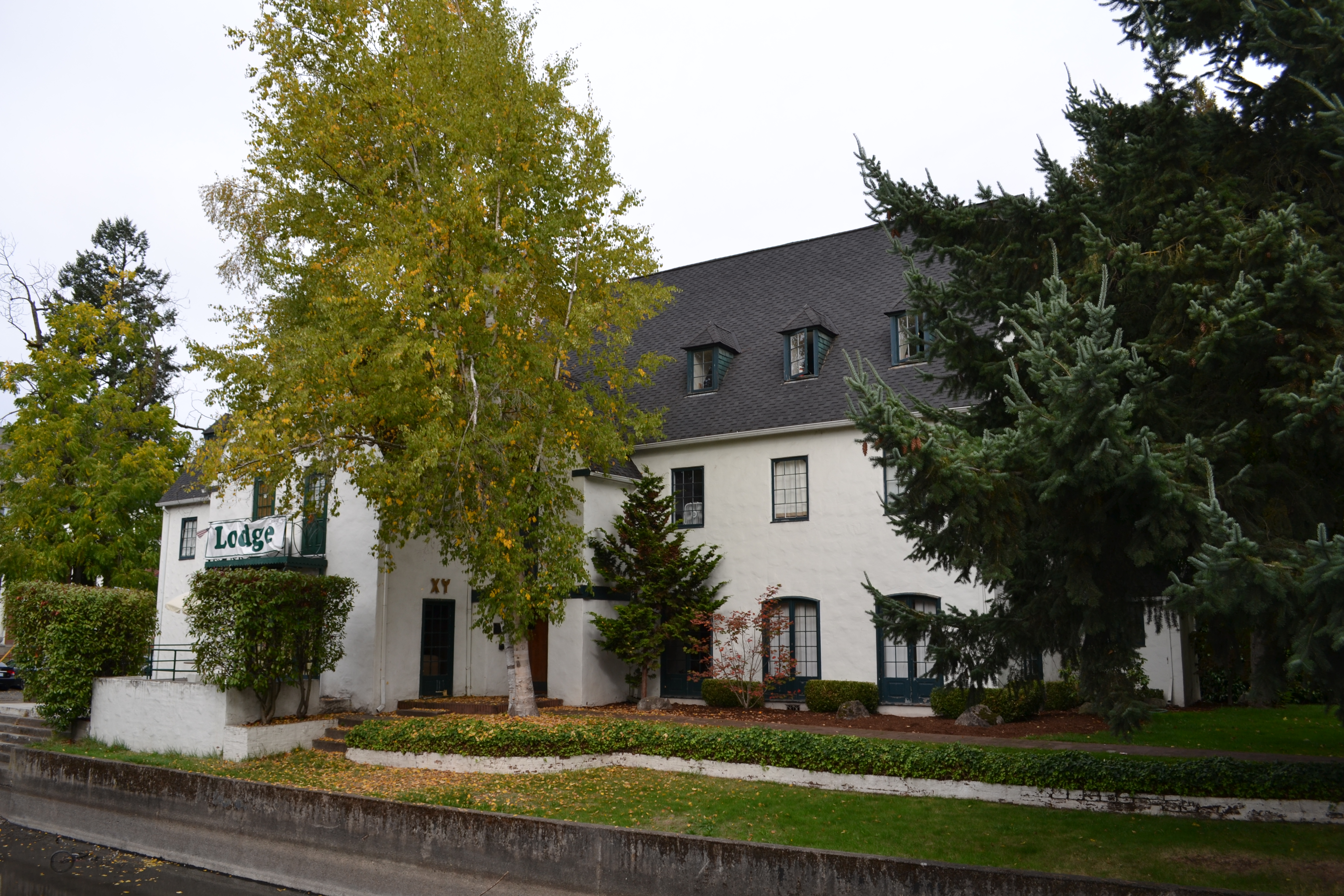
- Chi Psi Fraternity House in 2011
- Location: 1018 Hilyard Street; Eugene, Oregon, US
- Coordinates: 44°02′55″N 123°04′56″W
- Built: 1935
- Built by: Johnson & Pederson
- Architect: Richard Sundeleaf
- Architectural style: Tudor
- NRHP reference No.: 91001563
- Added to NRHP: March 18, 1993

The Chi Psi Fraternity House is a historic fraternity house near the University of Oregon in Eugene, Oregon, United States. The Tudor style chapter house was designed by architect Richard Sundeleaf and was completed in 1935. It was listed on the National Register of Historic Places in 1993.

== History ==
Chi Psi is a collegiate social fraternity that was established at Union College on May 20, 1841. Its Eta Delta chapter was chartered at the University of Oregon in 1921. It formed from S-Maralda, a local fraternity that was established on October 12, 1919. Eta Delta is one of the oldest fraternity chapters on campus.

On November 17, 1925, Eta Delta purchased land for a chapter house at 1018 Hilyard Street near the campus in Eugene, Oregon. In 1935, Eta Delta built its chapter house for $20,000 ($469,660 in 2024), with fraternity members working on the constructure crew. The fraternity refers to it chapter house as The Lodge, a tradition that started with the Epsilon chapter the University of Michigan, whose chapter house resembled a traditional hunting lodge. Members moved into the Lodge in early April 1935.

In 1938, the Chi Psi Association of Alpha Eta Delta was established and took over the management of The Lodge. There was a roof fire on June 12, 1945, which damage he Lodge.

The Lodge was listed on the National Register of Historic Places on March 18, 1993 as the Chi Psi Fraternity House.

== Architecture ==
Chi Psi Fraternity House was designed as a residence for the Eta Delta chapter by Portland, Oregon architect Richard Sundeleaf, an alumnus of the University of Oregon. During the 1930s, Sundeleaf designed numerous English Cottage-style residences in Portland and Lake Oswego, based on 16th and 17th century English traditional dwellings. Johnson & Pederson construction the house, with fraternity members working on the construction crew. It was completed in April 1935.

Chi Psi Fraternity House is a two-and-a-half-story English cottage in Tudor style, stucco over a wood-frame structure. Some describe the style as Arts and Crafts. The building has a corbelled brick chimney, dormers, and a hipped-gabled roof that covered in wood shingles. Brick steps lead to the asymmetrically placed entrance, located toward the south side, and is supported by a heavy timber post and beam. Above the entrance, is a multi-paneled window and a wrought iron light fixture. There are iron balconies and fire escapes on the second floor on the east, south, and west facades. The south and east sides of the building have arched French doors opening to the living and dining rooms.

Inside, the main level includes a dining room, kitchen, living room, and office. The house was originally decorated in Georgian style. The living room retains three French doors and a fireplace featuring tan-colored Roman brick, terracotta tiles, and a wood carving of a tree with squirrels, owls, and the fraternity's crest and seal. To the west, an addition added a recreation room to the first floor. Originally, the recreation room was located in the basement. The second floor includes bedrooms and central bathrooms, originally housing 28 members. The third floor was originally an attic but was remodeled into bedrooms and a library.

The first remodeling took place in 1945 after a house fire. In 1968, a west wing was added, including nine bedrooms, a social room, and a back patio. After this expansion, the Lodge had 25 bedrooms and a recessed porch. Other updates were made in 1988 and 2001. In 2020, a renovation updated the second and third floors, adding built-in furniture, electrical, fire safety systems, and heating. In addition, oak flooring, reclaimed from the Lodge at the University of Washington, was added and restored. The 2020 renovation also relocated and expanded the study library, added bathrooms, and updated the kitchen and laundry facilities.

The chapter house property is adjacent to the Mill Race, a channel off the Willamette River. The house is oriented toward the Mill Race and has brick retaining walls and a narrow terraced lawn between it and the water. On the south side of the house, there is a brick terrace that goes to a stepped boat landing on the stream.

== See also ==
- National Register of Historic Places listings in Lane County, Oregon
- North American fraternity and sorority housing
