= National Register of Historic Places listings in Multnomah County, Oregon =

Location of Multnomah County in Oregon

The following list presents the full set of National Register of Historic Places listings in Multnomah County, Oregon. However, please see separate articles (links below) for listings in each of Portland's six quadrants.

The National Register of Historic Places recognizes buildings, structures, objects, sites, and districts of national, state, or local historic significance across the United States. Out of over 90,000 National Register sites nationwide, Oregon is home to over 2,000, and over one-fourth of those are found in Multnomah County. In turn, the large majority (over 90%) of the county's National Register entries are situated within Portland.

This list includes only sites within Multnomah County but outside the municipal boundaries of Portland. While some sites appear in this list (and corresponding lists for neighboring counties) showing "Portland" as a general locality, based on their mailing addresses, they are nevertheless beyond city limits.

This National Park Service list is complete through NPS recent listings posted September 4, 2026.

== Current listings ==
=== Portland ===
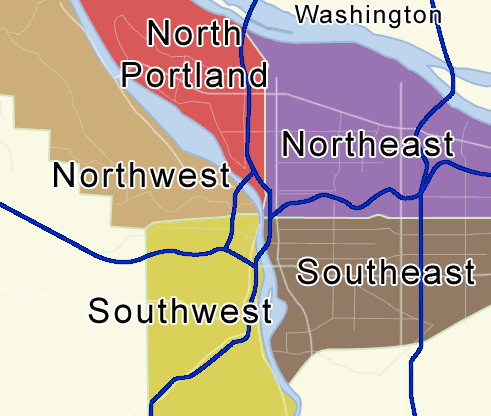
Locator map showing five of Portland's six quadrants. Click a quadrant to go to its National Register list. (South Portland listings are included on the Southwest Portland list.)

Over 500 National Register listings lie within the municipal boundaries of Portland. Although all of these sites lie within Multnomah County, their sheer number makes it prohibitive to include them all in the same table. To find detailed listings for each of Portland's six quadrants, click on a link below or on the map at the right.

Lists by quadrant: North • Northeast • Northwest • Southeast • South and Southwest

=== Outside Portland ===
	Name on the Register	Image	Date listed	Location	City or town	Description
1	Roy E. and Hildur L. Amundsen House	Roy E. and Hildur L. Amundsen House	July 15, 2019 (#100004161)	477 NW Overlook Avenue; 45°30′03″N 122°26′34″W	Gresham	Built in 1961, this house is a highly intact example of a home designed in the style of Frank Lloyd Wright. An almost complete expression of Wright's principles for Usonian homes, it was designed by the son of the original owners while he was an architecture student, and hand-built by him and his grandfather.
2	Emanuel and Christina Anderson House	Emanuel and Christina Anderson House	May 22, 2005 (#05000448)	1420 SE Roberts Avenue; 45°29′11″N 122°25′01″W	Gresham	
3	Rae Selling Berry Garden and House	Rae Selling Berry Garden and House	December 31, 2002 (#02001637)	11505 S Summerville Avenue (Note: This property as listed on the National Register has a Southwest Portland address. The address shown has been updated to reflect the creation of the new South Portland addressing area on May 1, 2020.); 45°26′33″N 122°39′43″W	Portland	
4	Bonneville Dam Historic District	Bonneville Dam Historic District	April 9, 1986 (#86000727)	Between Interstate 84 and Washington State Route 14; 45°38′29″N 121°56′41″W	Bonneville (and North Bonneville, Washington)	Built in the 1930s to harness the Columbia River for power generation, this was the first hydroelectric dam with a hydraulic drop sufficient to produce 500,000 kW of hydropower. The NHL district covers the dam and other elements of the federal dam project, including the #1 powerhouse, navigation lock, fish ladder, and hatchery.
5	Bybee–Howell House	Bybee–Howell House	November 5, 1974 (#74001716)	13901 NW Howell Park Road; 45°38′29″N 122°49′08″W	Sauvie Island	
6	Columbia River Highway Historic District	Columbia River Highway Historic District	December 12, 1983 (#83004168)	Roughly along the south side of the Columbia River (Note: The Columbia River Highway Historic District is a linear district with the Sandy River Bridge, Troutdale, at its west end, and the Chenoweth Creek Bridge, The Dalles, at the east end. See also Hood River and Wasco counties.); 45°32′23″N 122°14′39″W	Troutdale to The Dalles	Constructed between 1913 and 1922, this was the first scenic highway in the United States. Designed specifically to provide visitors access to the most outstanding of the scenic features of the Columbia River Gorge, the highway is also an outstanding example of modern highway development for its pioneering advances in road engineering.
7	Elliott R. Corbett House	Elliott R. Corbett House	October 3, 1996 (#96001070)	1600 S Greenwood Road; 45°26′01″N 122°39′43″W	Portland vicinity	This 1915 Colonial Revival house is one of the finest examples of the residential work of Whitehouse and Fouilhoux, one of Portland's leading architecture firms in the second decade of the 20th century. It also represents the origins of the Dunthorpe neighborhood as a country-style suburb for Portland's elite.
8	H. L. and Gretchen Hoyt Corbett House	H. L. and Gretchen Hoyt Corbett House	February 28, 1991 (#91000129)	1405 S Corbett Hill Circle; 45°26′19″N 122°39′50″W	Portland	
9	Maurice Crumpacker House	Maurice Crumpacker House	October 23, 1992 (#92001378)	12714 S Iron Mountain Boulevard; 45°25′59″N 122°39′30″W	Portland vicinity	
10	Fairview City Jail	Fairview City Jail	May 23, 2016 (#16000290)	120 1st Street; 45°32′22″N 122°26′01″W	Fairview	
11	Roy and Leola Gangware House	Roy and Leola Gangware House	February 23, 1990 (#90000284)	4848 SW Humphrey Boulevard; 45°30′17″N 122°43′35″W	Portland	
12	William Gedamke House	William Gedamke House	November 13, 1989 (#89001970)	1304 E Powell Boulevard; 45°29′52″N 122°25′06″W	Gresham	Prominently located near Gresham's original business core, this house is one of the finest expressions of the Queen Anne style in the city. It was constructed ca. 1900, about the time the first interurban trains reached Gresham from Portland. The design was based on a widely-circulated 1891 mail-order plan book by George F. Barber.
13	Andreas Graf House	Andreas Graf House	November 13, 1980 (#80003356)	44222 SE Loudon Road; 45°30′40″N 122°12′29″W	Corbett	This house, originally built in the Carpenter Gothic style around 1885, was expanded and transformed into the more fashionable Queen Anne style around 1891. German immigrant Andreas Graf first staked his homestead claim in 1883, building the house using lumber he milled himself. Graf's descendants continued to own the house at least until 2014.
14	Gresham Carnegie Library	Gresham Carnegie Library	January 24, 2000 (#99001715)	410 N Main Street; 45°30′02″N 122°25′51″W	Gresham	
15	Charles Hunter Hamlin House	Charles Hunter Hamlin House	June 7, 2016 (#16000346)	1322 SE 282nd Avenue; 45°29′13″N 122°22′20″W	Gresham	
16	Fred Harlow House	Fred Harlow House	February 16, 1984 (#84003078)	726 E Historic Columbia River Highway; 45°32′17″N 122°22′57″W	Troutdale	
17	Pierre Rossiter and Charlotte Hines House	Pierre Rossiter and Charlotte Hines House	June 20, 2002 (#02000660)	2393 S Military Road; 45°26′34″N 122°39′17″W	Portland	
18	Dr. Herbert H. Hughes House	Dr. Herbert H. Hughes House	September 5, 2001 (#01000932)	1229 W Powell Boulevard; 45°29′51″N 122°26′40″W	Gresham	
19	Joseph Jacobberger Country House	Joseph Jacobberger Country House	January 24, 2011 (#10001171)	5545 SW Sweetbriar Street; 45°29′56″N 122°44′04″W	Portland	Leading Portland architect and civic activist Joseph Jacobberger (1869–1930) designed this Arts and Crafts style house for his family in 1916, and lived in it from 1917 until his death. He resided here through the height of his career, a period during which he designed over 250 commissions that shaped the face of Portland.
20	Peter and Laurie King Kerr Estate	Peter and Laurie King Kerr Estate	August 31, 2026 (#100013362)	11800 S. Military Lane; 45°26′25″N 122°39′08″W	Portland	Has a Portland mailing address, but is actually located in the unincorporated Dunthorpe area.
21	C. Hunt and Gertrude McClintock Lewis House	C. Hunt and Gertrude McClintock Lewis House	March 3, 2015 (#15000054)	11645 S Military Lane; 45°26′27″N 122°39′12″W	Portland	
22	Louise Home Hospital and Residence Hall	Louise Home Hospital and Residence Hall	September 10, 1987 (#87001556)	722 NE 162nd Avenue; 45°31′41″N 122°29′45″W	Gresham	Hospital built in 1925 that served unwed mothers, pregnant women, and disabled children. The building was erected to address overcrowding in the Albertina Kerr houses in Portland, which offered similar services. The surrounding campus also contained a nursery and educational institute for women.
23	Donald and Ruth McGraw House	Donald and Ruth McGraw House	September 3, 2001 (#01000935)	1845 S Military Road; 45°26′22″N 122°39′35″W	Portland	
24	Multnomah County Poor Farm	Multnomah County Poor Farm	June 1, 1990 (#90000844)	2126 SW Halsey Street; 45°32′13″N 122°24′24″W	Troutdale	
25	Multnomah Falls Lodge and Footpath	Multnomah Falls Lodge and Footpath	April 22, 1981 (#81000512)	Historic Columbia River Highway, northeast of Bridal Veil; 45°34′38″N 122°07′02″W	Bridal Veil vicinity	
26	E. J. O'Donnell House	E. J. O'Donnell House	January 28, 1994 (#93001564)	5535 SW Hewett Boulevard; 45°30′16″N 122°44′04″W	Portland	
27	Charles and Fae Olson House	Charles and Fae Olson House	September 7, 2007 (#07000921)	765 SW Walters Road; 45°29′30″N 122°26′02″W	Gresham	This modern-styled home — designed and hand-built by the novice owner-occupant — embodies the breaks with tradition embraced by the generation returning from World War II. The main outlines of the plan were developed during mail correspondence between Charles Olson and his wife Fae while he was serving in the Pacific, and many features are patterned on the books and magazines available to him.
28	David and Marianne Ott House	David and Marianne Ott House	April 20, 2015 (#15000167)	2075 SE Palmblad Road; 45°28′57″N 122°24′14″W	Gresham	
29	John V. G. Posey House	John V. G. Posey House	October 17, 1990 (#90001517)	2107 S Greenwood Road; 45°26′11″N 122°39′26″W	Portland	
30	Dr. A. E. and Phila Jane Rockey House	Dr. A. E. and Phila Jane Rockey House	December 2, 1985 (#85003036)	10263 S Riverside Drive; 45°27′03″N 122°39′37″W	Portland	
31	Percy A. Smith House	Percy A. Smith House	February 22, 1991 (#91000135)	1837 S Greenwood Road; 45°26′11″N 122°39′38″W	Portland	
32	Stanley C. E. Smith House	Stanley C. E. Smith House	June 19, 1991 (#91000796)	1905 S Greenwood Road; 45°26′11″N 122°39′31″W	Portland vicinity	
33	Springdale School	Springdale School	October 25, 2011 (#11000771)	32405 E Historic Columbia River Highway; 45°31′10″N 122°19′46″W	Corbett vicinity	
34	Sunken Village Archeological Site (35MU4)	Sunken Village Archeological Site (35MU4)	December 20, 1989 (#89002455)	Address restricted (Note: Federal and state laws and practices restrict general public access to information regarding the specific location of this resource. In some cases, this is to protect archeological sites from vandalism, while in other cases it is restricted at the request of the owner.)	Sauvie Island	The archeological remains of this Chinookan village are unusually well preserved. This cosmopolitan people's complex hunter-gatherer economy and extensive trade network allowed them to establish one of the highest population densities in aboriginal North America, yet they left very few physical remains. The site has been subject to erosion and looting, problems which have been ameliorated by a protective layer of riprap.
35	Troutdale Methodist Episcopal Church	Troutdale Methodist Episcopal Church	September 9, 1993 (#93000921)	302 SE Harlow Street; 45°32′21″N 122°23′10″W	Troutdale	
36	View Point Inn	View Point Inn	February 28, 1985 (#85000367)	40301 NE Larch Mountain Road; 45°31′59″N 122°14′55″W	Corbett	Set on a high promontory with a sweeping view of the Columbia River Gorge, this is the only remaining example of several fashionable resort inns that developed in conjunction with the Columbia River Highway in the 1910s and 1920s. In addition to illustrating the rise of automobile touring in the United States, it is also the only inn produced by prominent Portland architect Carl L. Linde.
37	Vista House	Vista House	November 5, 1974 (#74001705)	Historic Columbia River Highway; 45°32′22″N 122°14′40″W	Crown Point	
38	Whidden–Kerr House and Garden	Whidden–Kerr House and Garden	October 13, 1988 (#88001039)	11648 S Military Lane; 45°26′29″N 122°39′08″W	Portland	This 1901 house and carriage house, designed by William M. Whidden for himself and his family, is the "best expression" of the Prairie School by Whidden and Lewis, one of Portland's most prominent architectural firms of the period. Whidden's extensive gardens were further developed by Thomas and Mabel Kerr after they acquired the estate in 1911.
39	Theodore B. Wilcox Country Estate	Theodore B. Wilcox Country Estate	February 19, 1993 (#93000019)	3707 SW 52nd Place; 45°29′46″N 122°43′46″W	Portland	
40	Jacob Zimmerman House	Jacob Zimmerman House	June 5, 1986 (#86001226)	17111 NE Sandy Boulevard; 45°32′55″N 122°29′14″W	Gresham	

== Former listings ==
	Name on the Register	Image	Date listed	Date removed	Location	City or town	Description
1	Bethel Baptist Church		April 15, 1982 (#82003740)	April 18, 2006	101 S. Main Street	Gresham	Destroyed by fire on May 22, 2004.
2	Lewis H. Mills House		February 21, 1997 (#97000135)	May 24, 2010	1350 S Military Place; 45°26′24″N 122°39′59″W	Portland	Delisted due to extensive modifications.

== See also ==
- National Register of Historic Places listings in Oregon
- Listings in neighboring counties: Clackamas, Clark, Columbia, Hood River, Skamania, Washington
- List of National Historic Landmarks in Oregon
- Historic preservation
- History of Oregon
- Lists of Oregon-related topics
