= Theodore B. Wilcox Country Estate =

House in Portland, Oregon, U.S.

Coordinates: 45°29′46.5″N 122°43′46″W

- U.S. National Register of Historic Places
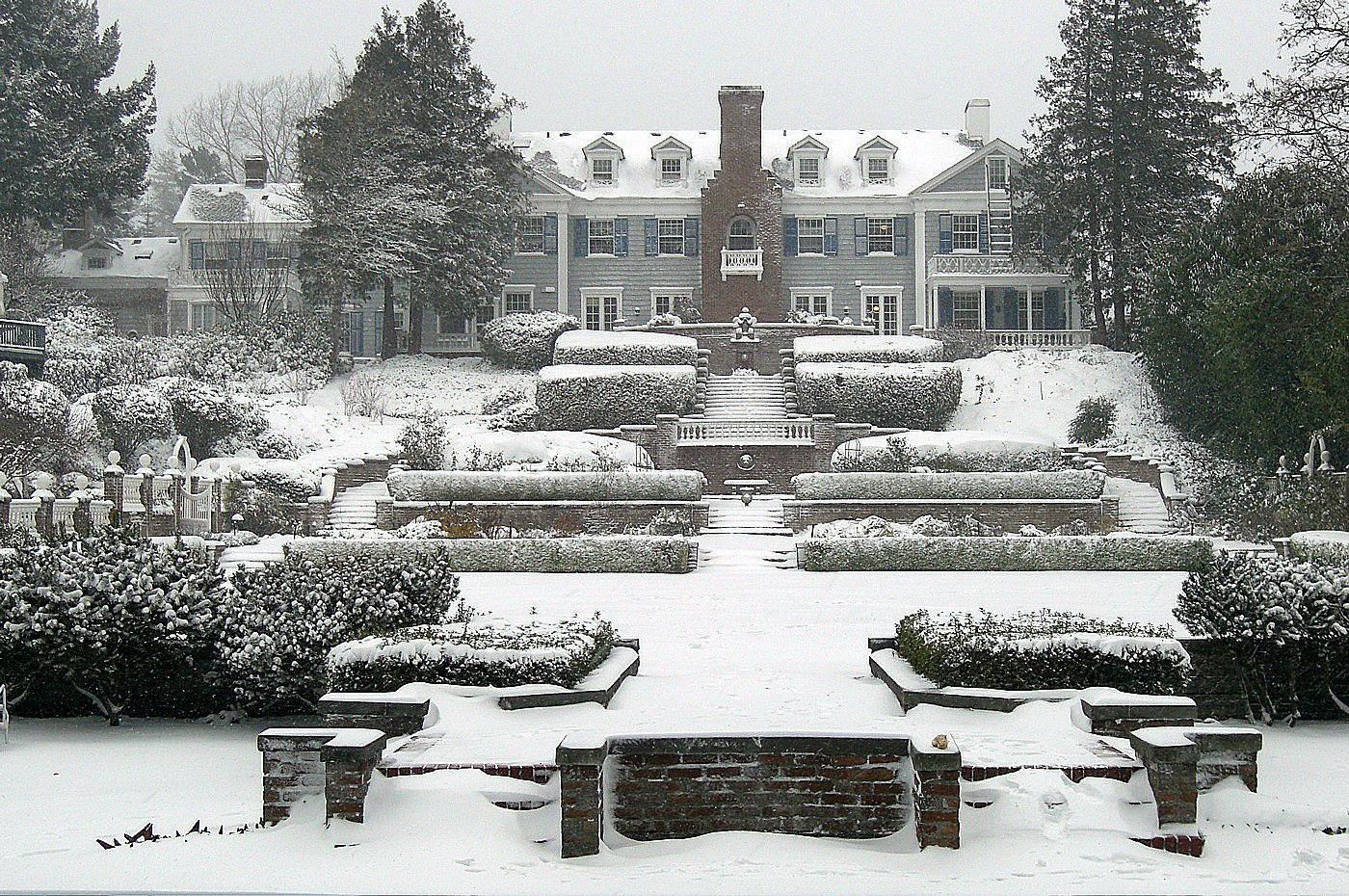
- Theodore B. Wilcox Country Estate in December 2008
- Interactive map of Theodore B. Wilcox Country Estate
- Location: Portland, Oregon
- Built: 1917
- Architect: Kirtland Cutter
- Architectural style: Colonial Revival
- NRHP reference No.: 93000019
- Added to NRHP: February 19, 1993

The Theodore B. Wilcox Country Estate, located in Portland, Oregon, is listed on the National Register of Historic Places.

== See also ==
- National Register of Historic Places listings in Multnomah County, Oregon
