= Richard T.C. Lord and William V. Wilcox House =

Historic house in Iowa, United States

- U.S. National Register of Historic Places
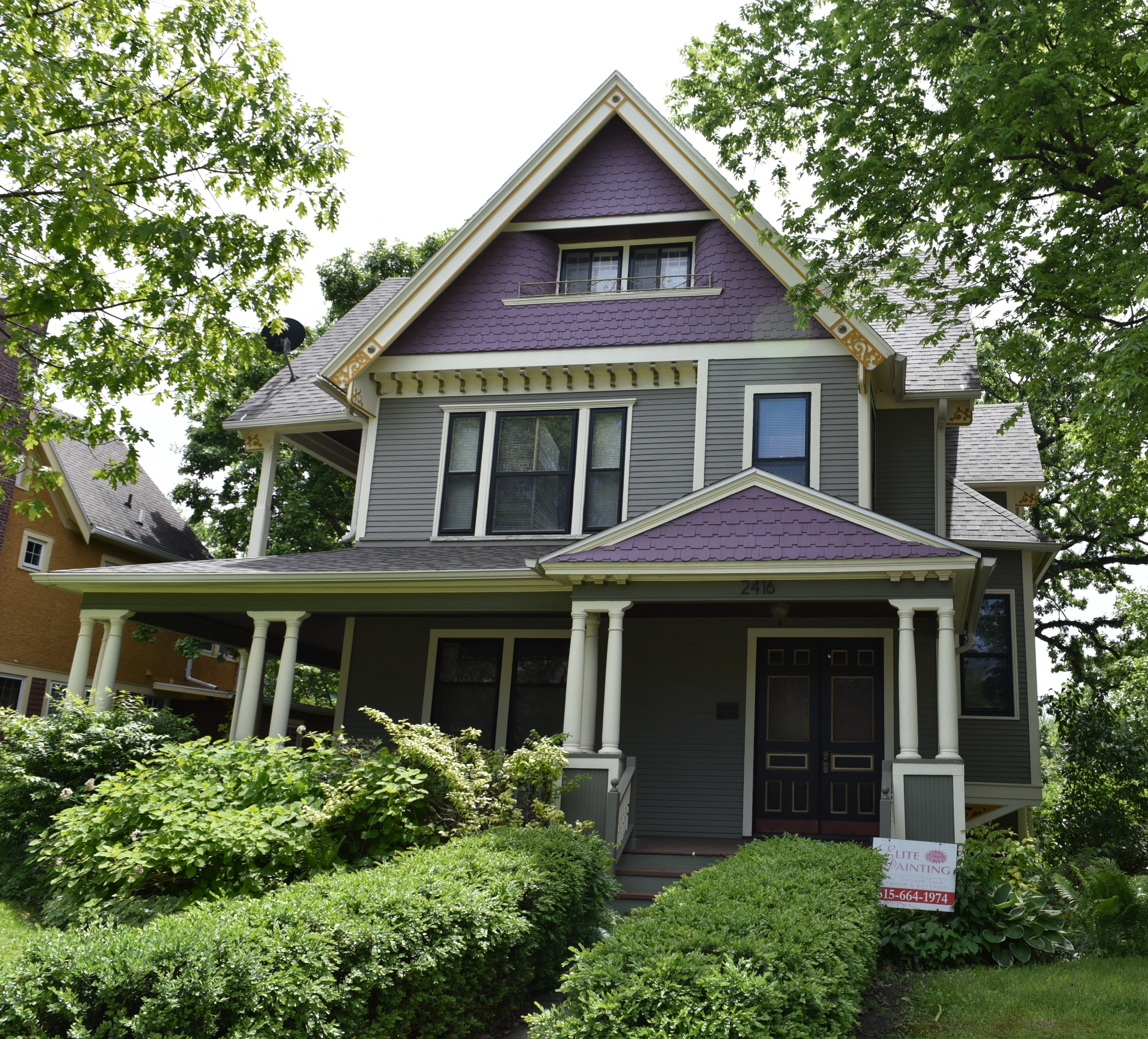

- Location within Iowa Location within the United States
- Location: 2416 Kingman Blvd. Des Moines, Iowa
- Coordinates: 41°35′46.6″N 93°39′02.5″W
- Area: less than one acre
- Built: 1888
- Architectural style: Colonial Revival; Queen Anne
- MPS: Drake University and Related Properties in Des Moines, Iowa, 1881--1918 MPS
- NRHP reference No.: 88001336
- Added to NRHP: September 8, 1988

The Richard T.C. Lord and William V. Wilcox House is a historic building located in Des Moines, Iowa, United States. This 2½-story dwelling follows a crossed gable plan that features elements of both the Colonial Revival and Queen Anne styles. The Colonial Revival influence includes grouped round porch columns and a pedimented porch entry. The Queen Anne influences include its massing, the brackets at the gable end, the second story corner porch, bargeboards, shingles, and the large porch. The property on which it stands is one of ten plats that were owned by Drake University. The house's significance is attributed to the effect of the university's innovative financing techniques upon the settlement of the area around the campus. Lord was a realtor, one of the organizers of the University Land Company, and he was a member of the first board of trustees of the university. He lived here from 1888 to around 1890 when he sold it to W.V. Wilcox, an insurance agent for Hawkeye Insurance Company. The house was listed on the National Register of Historic Places in 1988.
