= Lanai (architecture) =

Type of roofed, open-sided veranda, patio or porch originating in Hawaiʻi

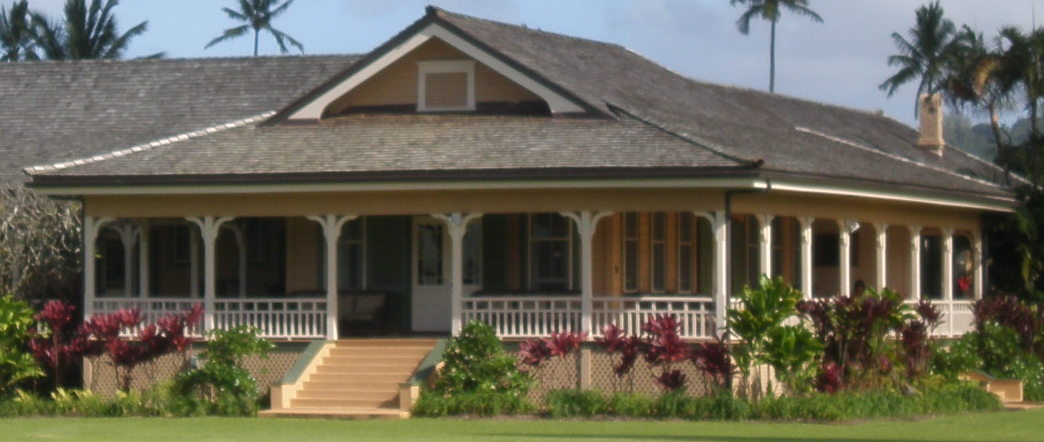
Albert Spencer Wilcox Beach House

A lanai or lānai is a type of roofed, open-sided veranda, patio, or porch originating in Hawaii. Many houses, apartment buildings, hotels, and restaurants in Hawaii are built with one or more lānais.

In Hawaii, the term describes any sort of outdoor living area adjacent to an interior space, whether roofed or not. This includes apartment and hotel balconies. It may be screened in or not.

== Examples ==
One example of Hawaiian architecture featuring a lānai is the Albert Spencer Wilcox Beach House on the Island of Kauai. The residence of Queen Liliʻuokalani, Washington Place in Honolulu, was constructed with "open lānais" on all sides.

== Architectural feature ==
The use of the lānai is one of the "Hawaiian modern" features in the style of some of the buildings of Vladimir Ossipoff, who saw in the lanai functional similarities to the Japanese engawa. A lanai may also be a covered exterior passageway. Disney animator Dorse Lanpher (1935–2011) notes in his memoirs the large covered lanais on the ocean side of his Honolulu hospital. Today, air-conditioned buildings such as hotels often offer "enclosed" rather than "open" lanais, sometimes meaning a large dining hall with a 'wall' of sliding glass doors.

== In popular culture ==
On The Golden Girls, the outdoor space of the titular characters' house is referred to as a lanai, particularly by Blanche Deveraux. An episode of the seventh season of The Middle, entitled "The Lanai", features the construction of a lanai at the Hecks' Indiana residence as a central plot element.

== Gallery ==
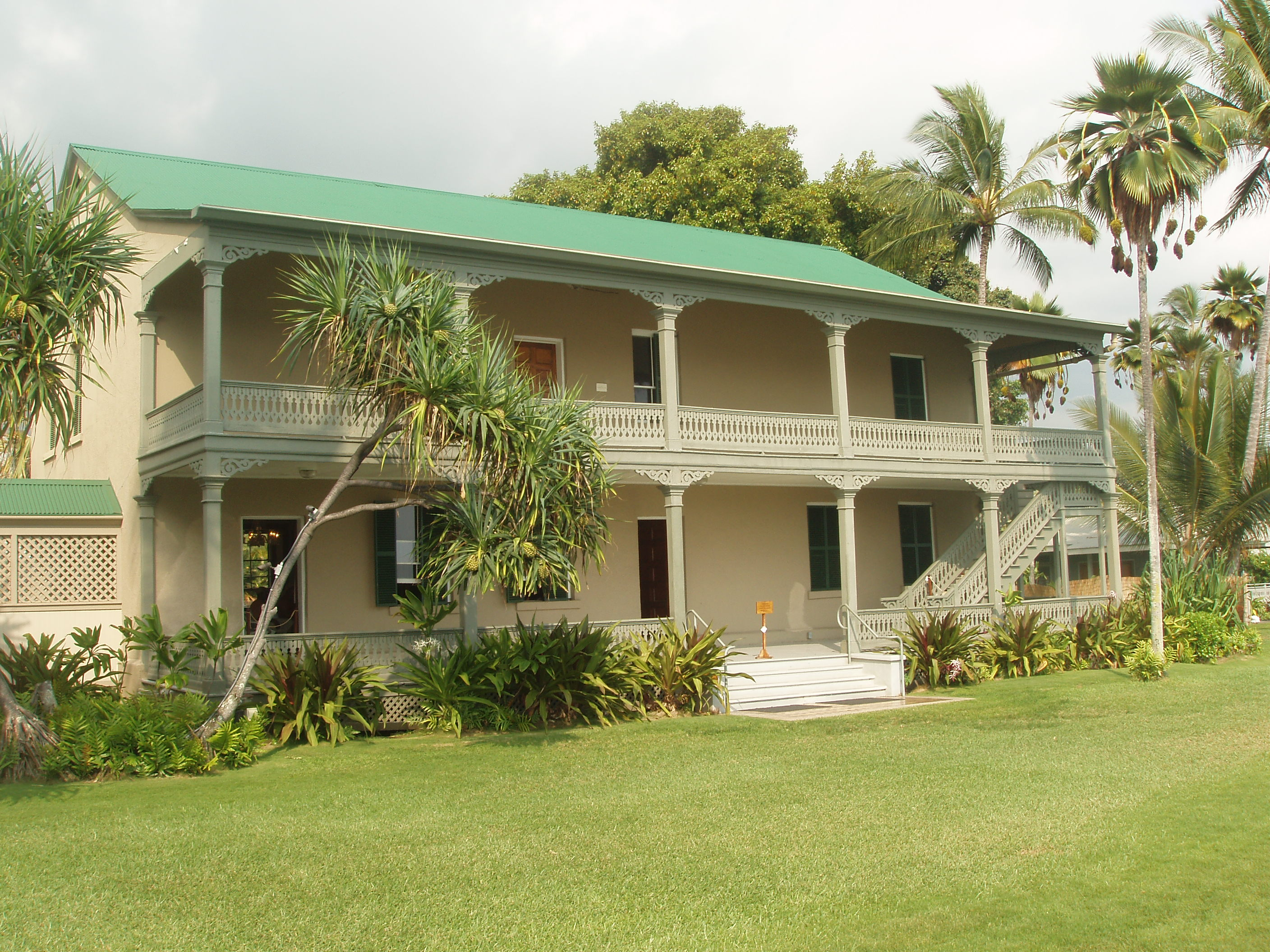
Oceanfront lanai of Huliheʻe Palace at Kailua-Kona, Hawaii

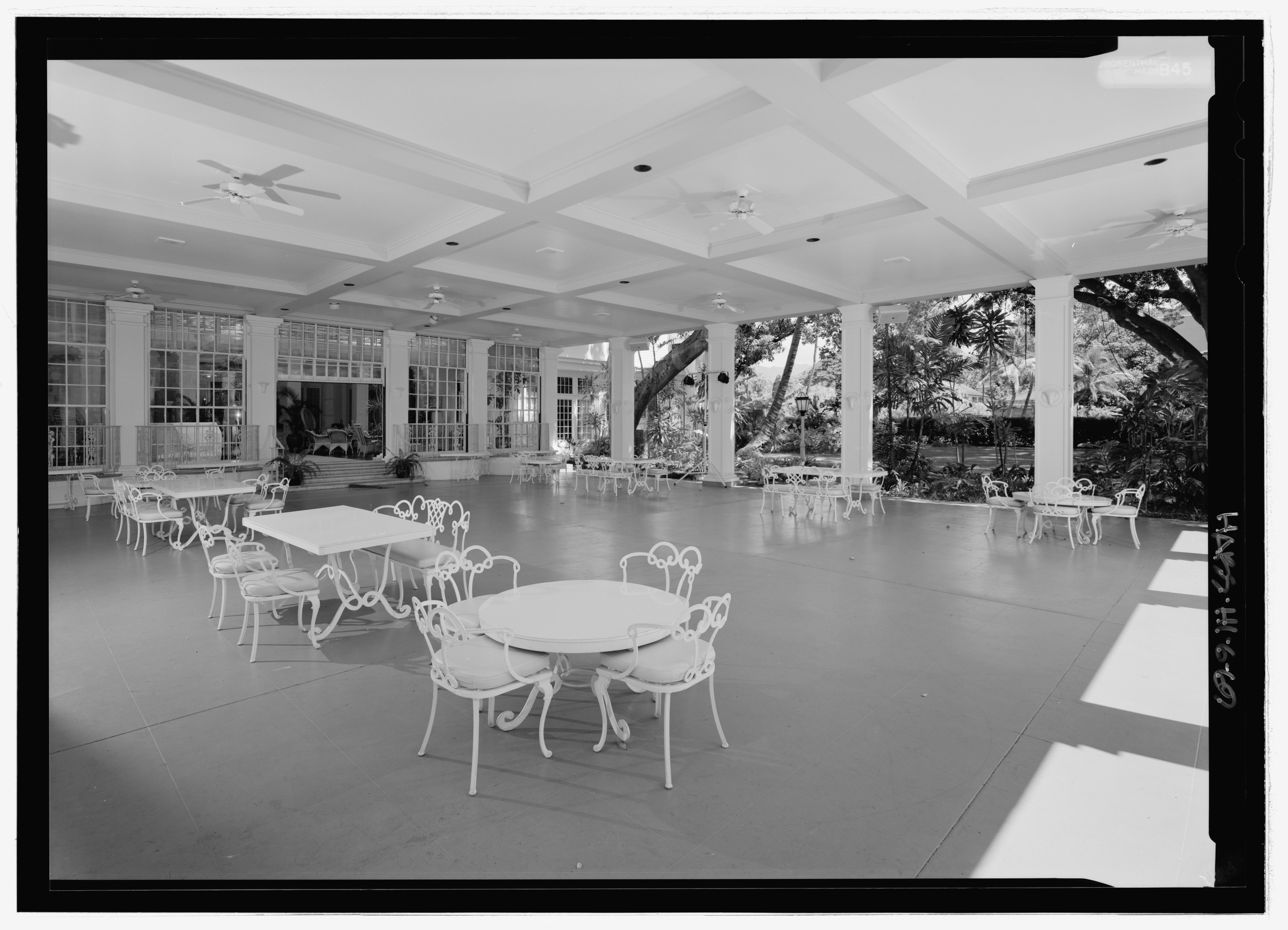
Open lanai of Washington Place in Honolulu

== See also ==
- Terrace (building)
