= Emanuel and Christina Anderson House =

Historic house in Oregon, United States

- U.S. National Register of Historic Places
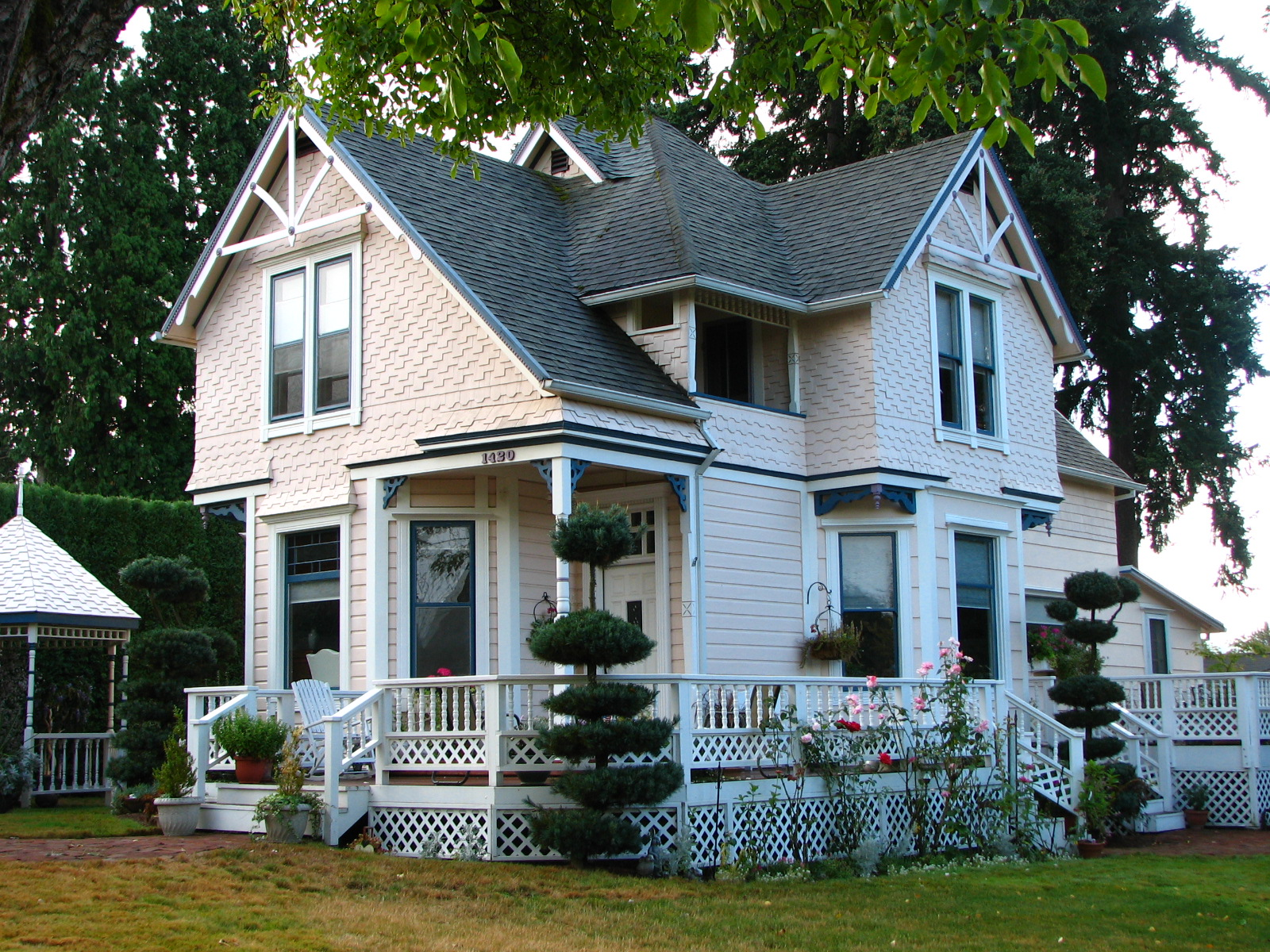
- Emanuel and Christina Anderson House in 2008

- Location within Oregon Location within the United States
- Location: 1420 SE Roberts Ave., Gresham, Oregon
- Coordinates: 45°29′11″N 122°24′57″W
- Area: less than one acre
- Built: 1906
- Built by: Charles Emil Witter
- Architectural style: Queen Anne
- NRHP reference No.: 05000448
- Added to NRHP: May 22, 2005

The Emanuel and Christina Anderson House, located in Gresham, Oregon, is a house listed on the National Register of Historic Places.

== See also ==
- National Register of Historic Places listings in Multnomah County, Oregon
