= Albert Spencer Wilcox Beach House =

Historic house in Hawaii, United States

- U.S. National Register of Historic Places
- Hawaiʻi Register of Historic Places
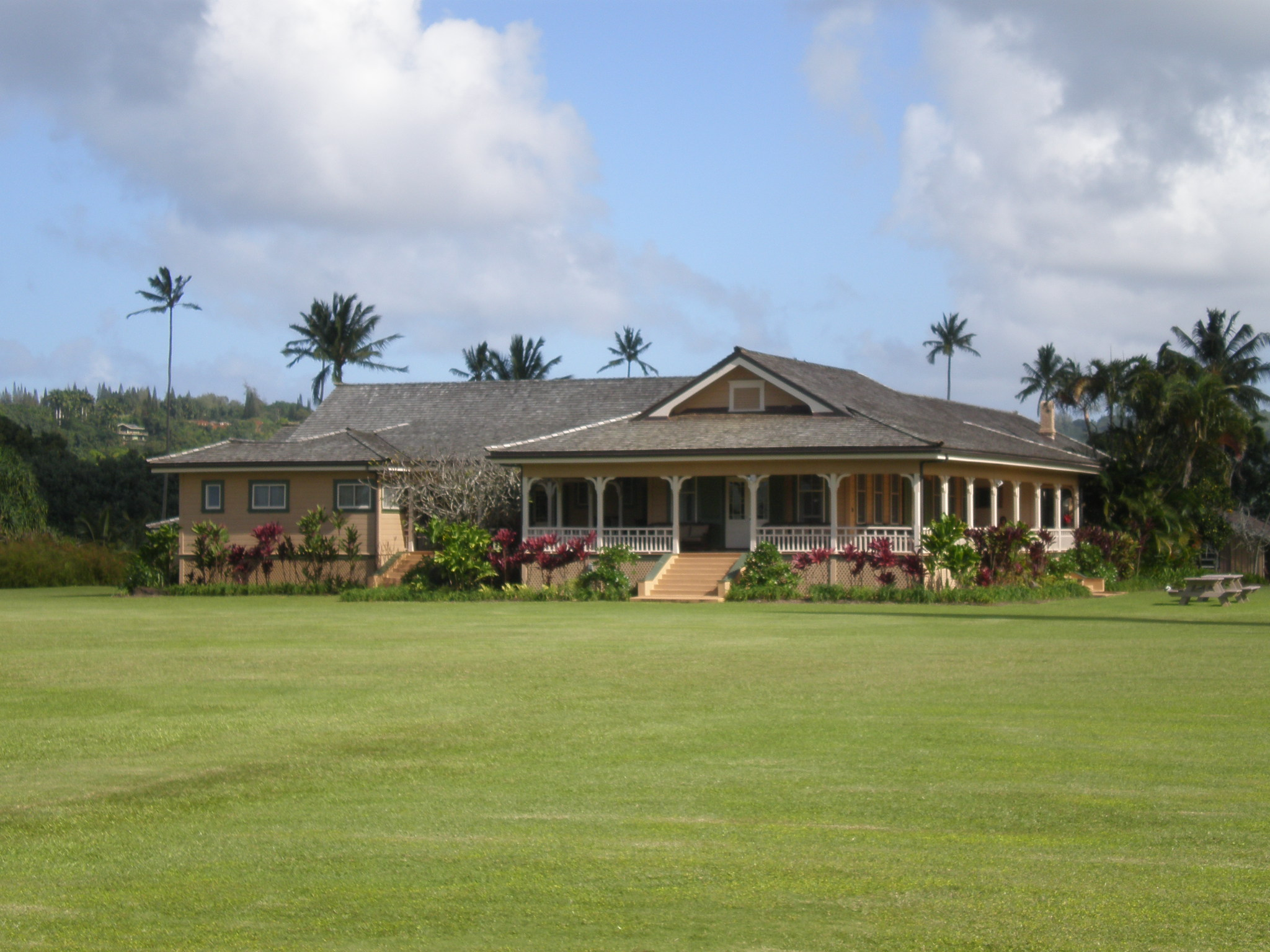
- Beach house, from Weke Road

- Location within Hawaii
- Location: Weke Road; Hanalei, Hawaii
- Coordinates: 22°12′34″N 159°29′44″W
- Area: 22 acres (8.9 ha)
- Architectural style: Folk Victorian
- NRHP reference No.: 93000725
- HRHP No.: 50-30-03-09371

Significant dates
- Added to NRHP: July 30, 1993
- Designated HRHP: September 12, 1987

The Albert Spencer Wilcox Beach House was a home of Albert Spencer Wilcox. Located on Weke Road in Hanalei, Hawaii, it was listed on the Hawaiʻi Register of Historic Places in 1987 and on the National Register of Historic Places in 1993. It is a Folk Victorian-style building, with roofed lānai connecting the rooms. A 22-acre (8.9 ha) property, including five contributing buildings and four other contributing structures, was listed.

It was deemed significant architecturally, and for its association with Albert Spencer Wilcox, and for its association with development of Hanalei as a recreation site.

Architecturally, it was deemed significant "as a good, surviving example of a late nineteenth/early twentieth century house in Hawaii. Its rambling design and separation of social, cooking and sleeping functions into detached rooms connected by a lanai is typical of the period. This house and the Gay residence (Hawaii and National Register of Historic Places) are the only known turn-of-the-century houses on Kauaʻi to retain such a feature. The use of shiplap siding, tongue and groove walls and ceiling, paneled doors, and the quality of workmanship reflect the period of construction. The orientation to the outdoors and the living space provide by the lanais, as well as the numerous windows and openings for light and ventilation, attest to the builder's understanding of the location and the type of lifestyle enjoyed in Hawaii. The house is also representative of the growth and changes within the Wilcox family; the house incorporates additions which provided more space for the growing family."

== See also ==
- Albert Spencer Wilcox Building, Lihue, Hawaii, also NRHP-listed
