= Highland Historic District (Middletown, Connecticut) =

Historic district in Connecticut, United States

- U.S. National Register of Historic Places
- U.S. Historic district
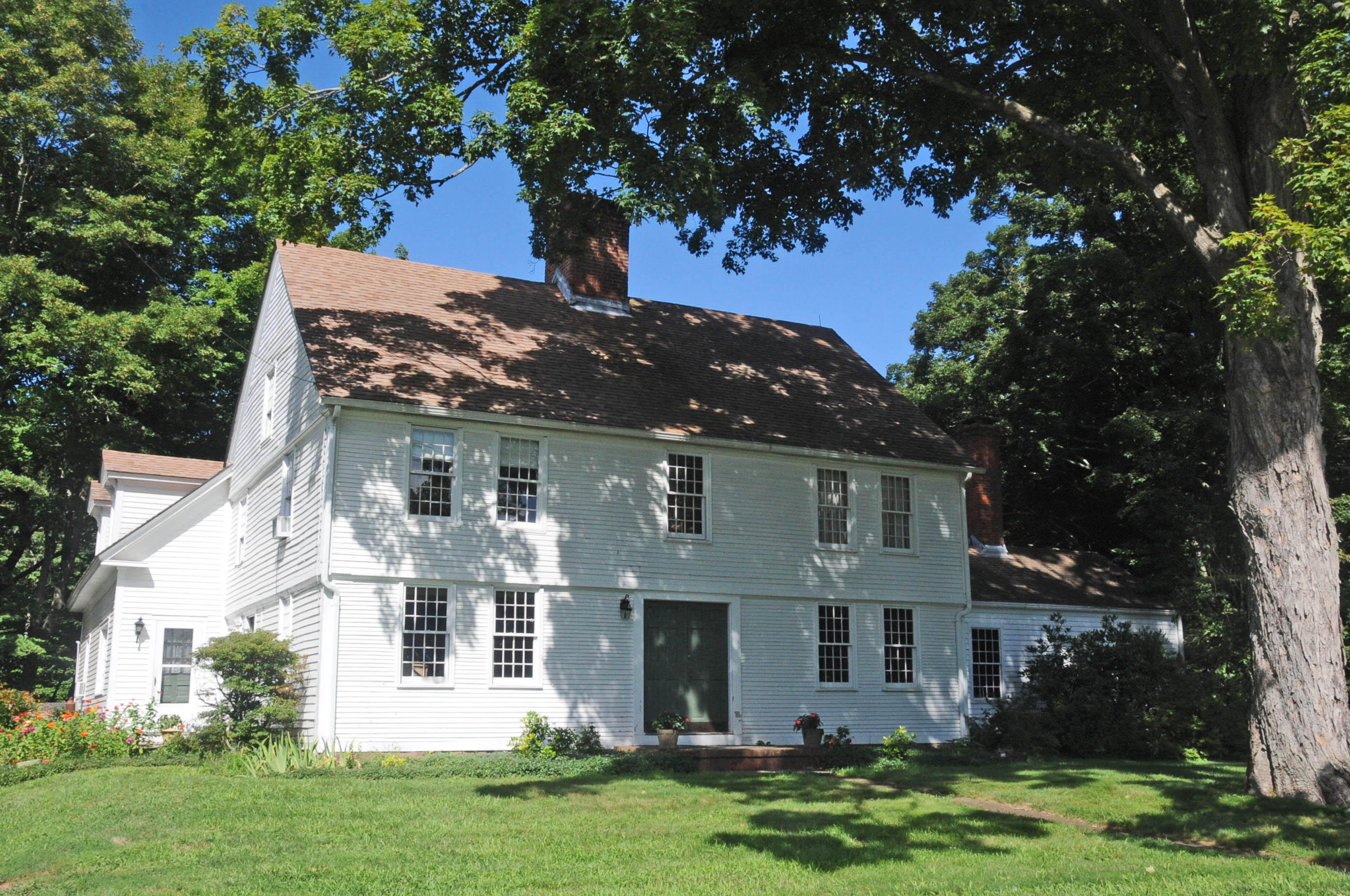

- Location within Connecticut Location within the United States
- Location: Atkins Street and Country Club Road, Middletown, Connecticut
- Coordinates: 41°34′5″N 72°44′16″W
- Area: 80 acres (32 ha)
- Architect: Multiple
- Architectural style: Greek Revival, Colonial, Federal
- NRHP reference No.: 82003770
- Added to NRHP: June 28, 1982

The Highland Historic District is a U.S. historic district in Middletown, Connecticut. Centered at the junction of Atkins Street and Country Club Road, the district encompasses a collection of well-preserved 18th and 19th-century architecture, including some of Middletown's oldest surviving buildings. The district was listed on the National Register of Historic Places in 1982.

== Description and history ==
The district is an irregular shape that includes, or fronts onto, portions of Atkins Street, Country Club Road, Sawmill Road, and Bell Road. It includes 15 houses, of which 9 are contributing buildings, and it includes a barn that is also a contributing structure. Four of the houses date from the mid- to late 18th century and were the homes of some of the earliest settlers in this part of Middletown. These are typical Georgian style houses, wood-frame structure with large central chimneys. Most of the remaining houses are either Federal or Greek Revival in their styling. The Highland neighborhood is representative of the now rare rural character of Middletown. It also has evidence of the area's success for a time as a small summer resort area.

The Highland area was settled in the early 18th century by members of the Warner, Wilcox, and Bacon families. The wide spacing of the older houses in the district is typical of building patterns in rural Middletown at the time. Although most farming families engaged in trades and crafts in addition to agriculture, those of the Wilcox family are particularly significant. They became involved in the manufacture of tinware, which later generations brought to the nearby city of Meriden, which became a leading manufacturing center for silverware.

== See also ==
- National Register of Historic Places listings in Middletown, Connecticut
