= Depot Park =

Park in Troutdale, Oregon, U.S.

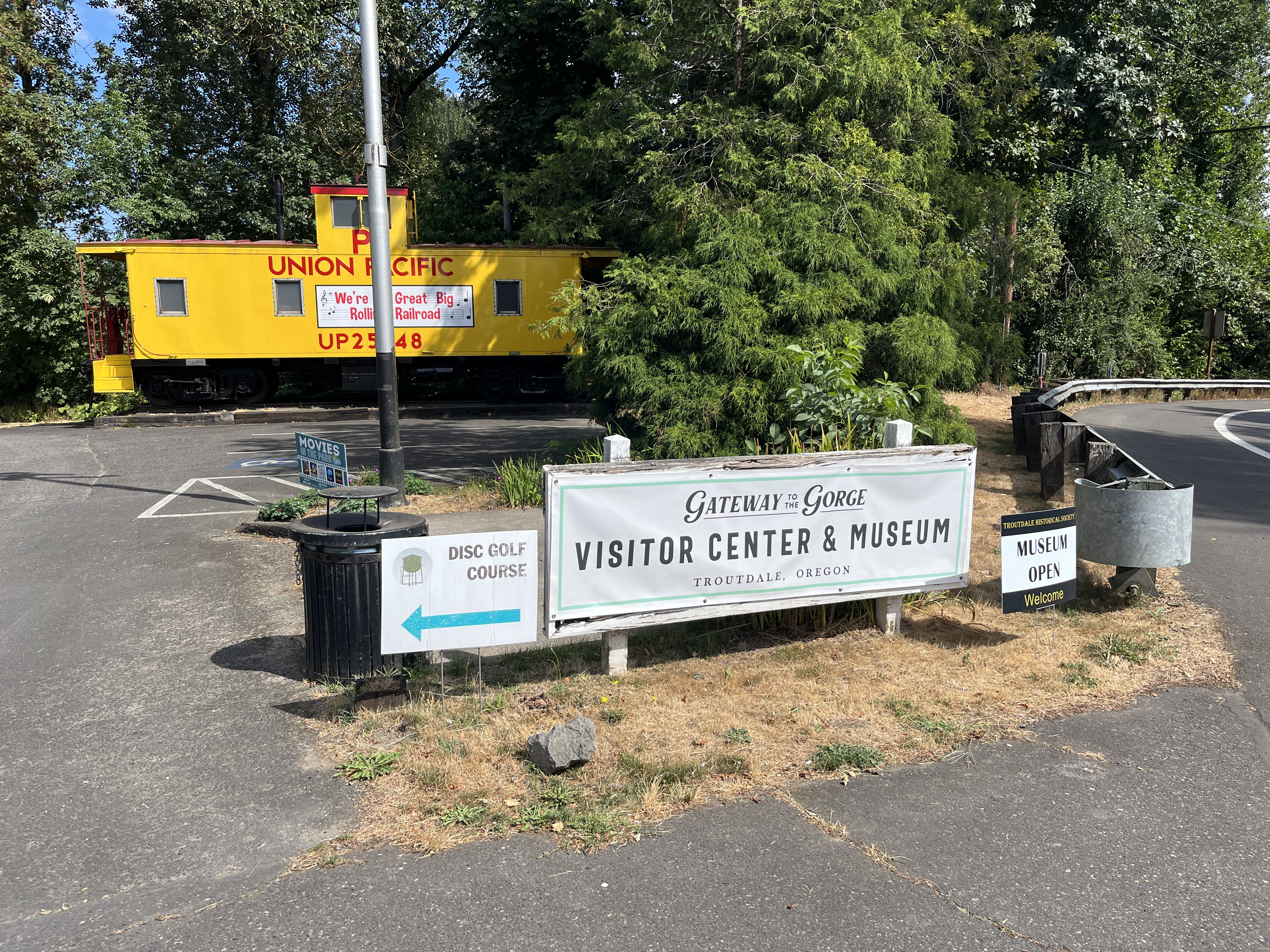
- 2022
- Interactive map of Depot Park
- Location: Troutdale, Oregon, U.S.
- Coordinates: 45°32′28″N 122°23′2″W

Depot Park is a public park in Troutdale, Oregon, United States. The 2.25-acre (0.91 ha) park is along the Union Pacific Railroad and Beaver Creek. It has hosted the Troutdale Open Air Market. There are plans for a three-mile-long trail from Depot Park to Mt. Hood Community College, as of 2017.

== See also ==
- Depot Rail Museum
