= Bissinger Wool Pullery =

Wool pullery in Troutdale, Oregon, U.S.

Coordinates: 45°32′31″N 122°23′07″W

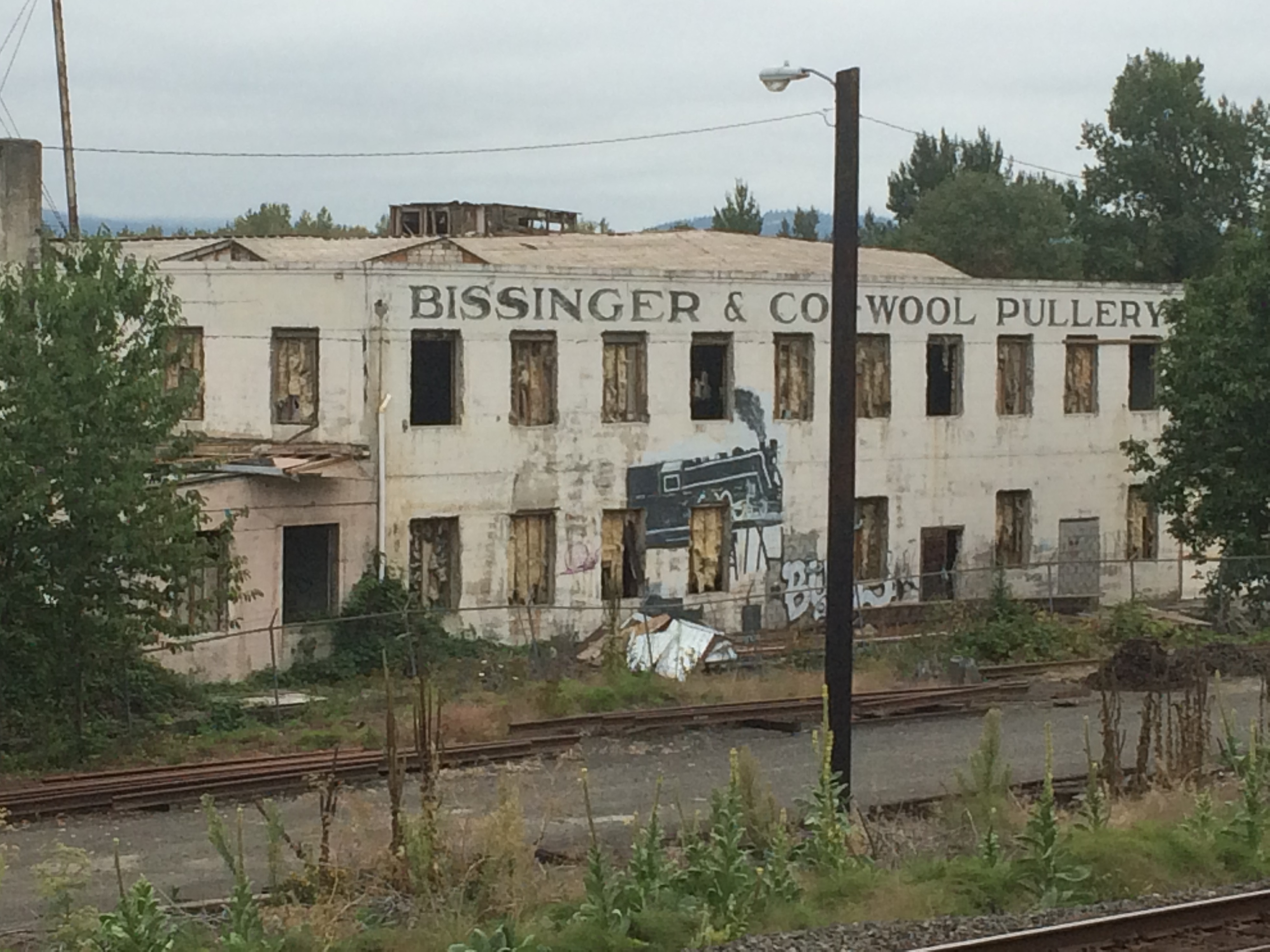
Bissinger Wool Pullery in 2019

Bissinger Wool Pullery was a wool pullery business in Troutdale, Oregon, United States. Adolph Bissinger, Samuel Bissinger, Louis Bissinger, and Louis Gerstle founded the business in the 1880s. The operation removed wool from sheep hides and processed the wool into bale, to be shipped out for further processing.

The site has been the subject of contamination cleanup efforts and has been considered for waterfront redevelopment.

== Function ==
The pullery processed sheep hides, by soaking them in a solution of sodium sulphate. After drying the hides, the wool was removed from the skins and pressed into bales weighing approximately 450 pounds. The sheep hides were received from nearby states, as well as Canada. The bales or wool were shipped to Boston and other markets in the eastern US. The remains of the sheep were buried on the site.

== History ==
The Bissinger Wool Pullery was founded by Adolph Bissinger, Samuel Bissinger, Louis Bissinger, and Louis Gerstle in the 1880s.

Its history in Troutdale originated with Samuel Bissinger, a Jewish immigrant from Bavaria who lived in Portland, Oregon. Bissinger arrived in the United States when he was 16 years old, and became an energetic promoter of the Portland area, who joined numerous social groups, and was respected for his ideas and judgment. He decided to move his family's pullery out of Sellwood, Oregon, into Troutdale onto an eight acre parcel located on Macadam Road at the west bank of the Sandy River. Bissinger opened for business in 1925.

By the 1930s, the pullery carried a weekly payroll of roughly $1,700, and is credited for keeping Troutdale alive during the Great Depression. In order to supply water for the operation, the iconic Troutdale water tower was erected in the 1930s. The plant thrived and operated for decades. Eventually, near the beginning of 1970, the owners ceased operation. The demand for wool declined as consumers turned to synthetic materials and inexpensive imports.

In 1972, Don Bennett opened a cabinet-making operation at the abandoned facility. His son later purchased the business, and continued production until 1999.

== Redevelopment ==
The site was purchased in 2000, by Eastwinds Development, owned by developer, Junki Yoshida. Yoshida anticipated redeveloping the site with a "much-anticipated" hotel and resort project. Lacking timely support from the city of Troutdale, the legal proceedings failed to force Columbia Gorge Outlets to allow road building through their mall site. The outlets largely blocked access to the site, and without the road, the city of Troutdale was obligated to purchase the site from Eastwinds Development.

== Environmental hazards ==
Prior to the pullery, the site had been used as a cattle slaughterhouse, and for hide processing/tanning. The cabinet-making business incurred EPA hazardous waste violations in 1991-92. The various activities on the property, since 1901, generated waste products, containing chromium and volatile organic compounds, which were found on the site, according to the Oregon Department of Environmental Quality. Sometime prior to 2006, Gresham Fire and Emergency Services condemned the building.

== Site cleanup ==
Before Eastwinds Development could proceed with any proposed development, the site required environmental cleanup due to assorted contamination. The buried sheep carcasses had decomposed into a sludge. It was thought that the removal would result in the odor of decomposition permeating the nearby area. Additionally, test pits revealed levels of contaminants which included petroleum hydrocarbons, polycyclic aromatic hydrocarbons (PAHs), and phenol. Furthermore, some concerning levels of chlorinated solvents such as chlorobenzene; 1,1,1-Trichloroethane (TCA); tetrachloroethylene (PCE); and breakdown products were also detected. While chromium levels were elevated, they did not constitute a concerning level.
