= Sunrise Park (Troutdale, Oregon) =

Public park in Troutdale, Oregon, U.S.

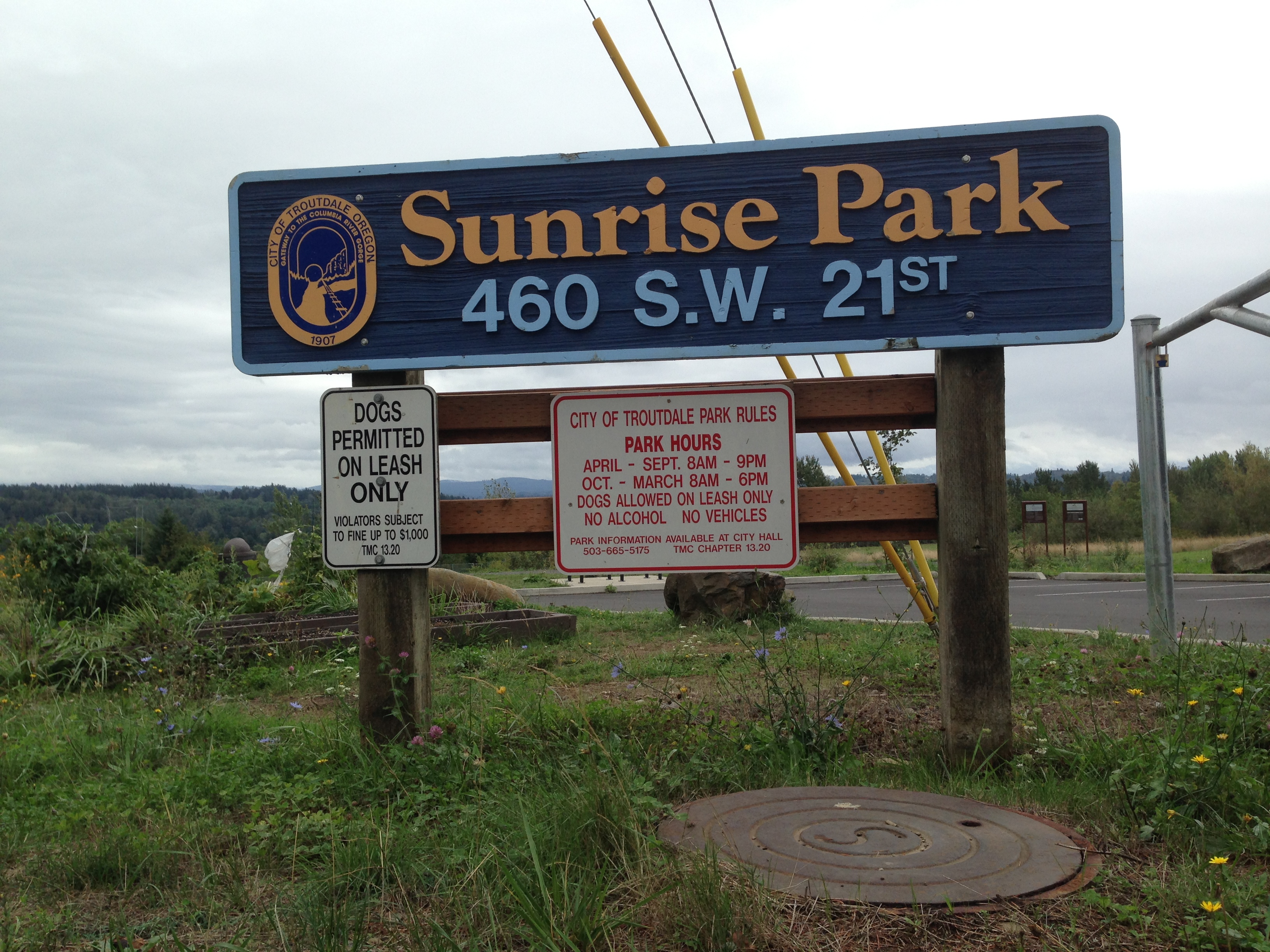
- Park sign, 2013
- Interactive map of Sunrise Park
- Location: Troutdale, Oregon, U.S.
- Coordinates: 45°31′31″N 122°23′33″W
- Area: 15.76 acres (6.38 ha)

Sunrise Park is a 15.76-acre (6.38 ha) public park in Troutdale, Oregon, United States. The site previously served as a landfill.
