= Troutdale Methodist Episcopal Church =

Church in Oregon, United States

- U.S. National Register of Historic Places
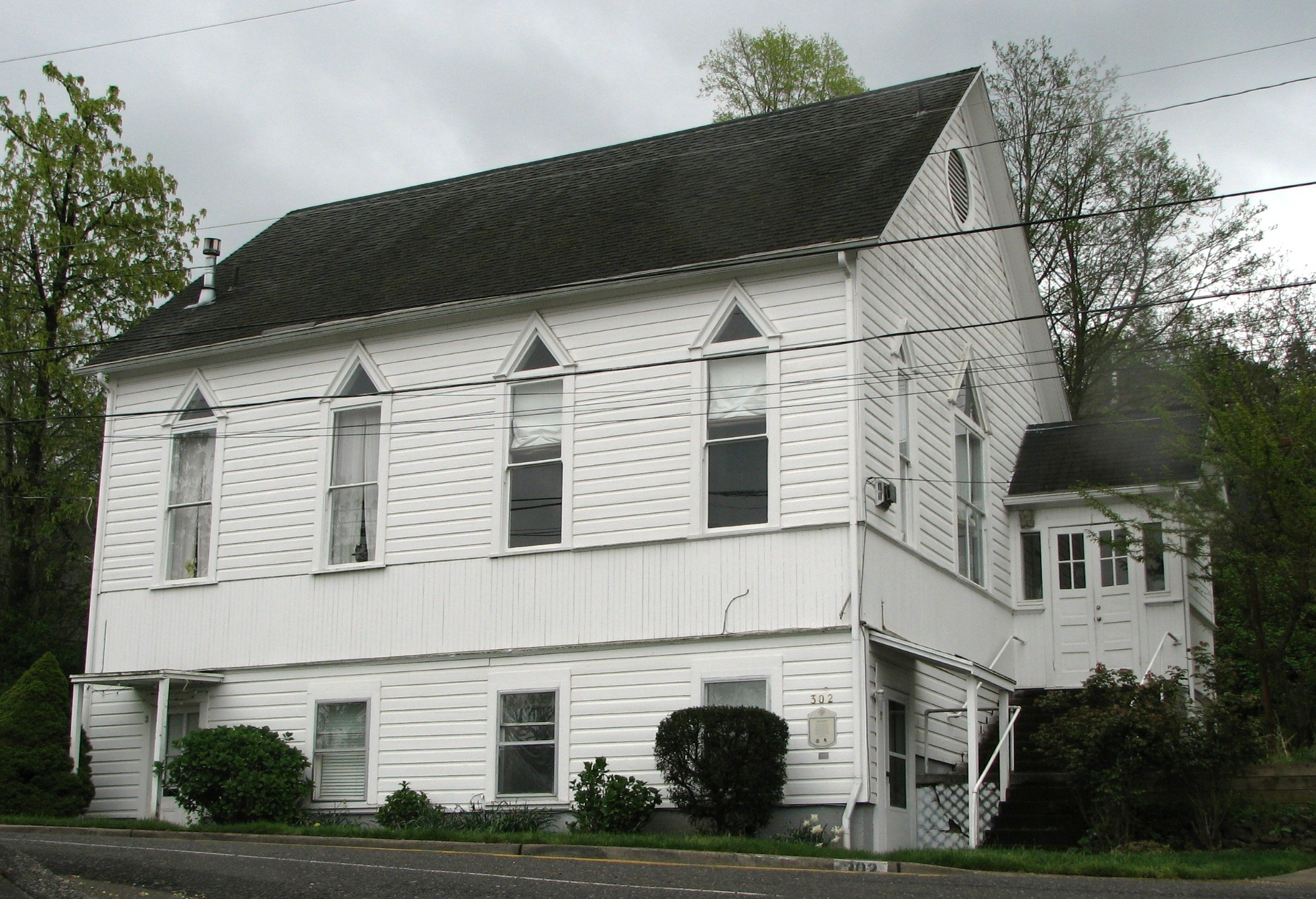
- The Troutdale Methodist Episcopal Church in 2007
- Location: 302 SE Harlow Street; Troutdale, Oregon
- Coordinates: 45°32′21″N 122°23′10″W
- Area: 0.1 acres (0.040 ha)
- Built: 1895
- Architectural style: Late Gothic Revival
- NRHP reference No.: 93000921
- Added to NRHP: September 9, 1993

Troutdale Methodist Episcopal Church (Troutdale Full Gospel Church) is a historic church at 302 SE Harlow Street in Troutdale, Oregon.

It was built in 1895 and added to the National Register of Historic Places in 1993.
