= Kiku Park =

Public park in Troutdale, Oregon, U.S.

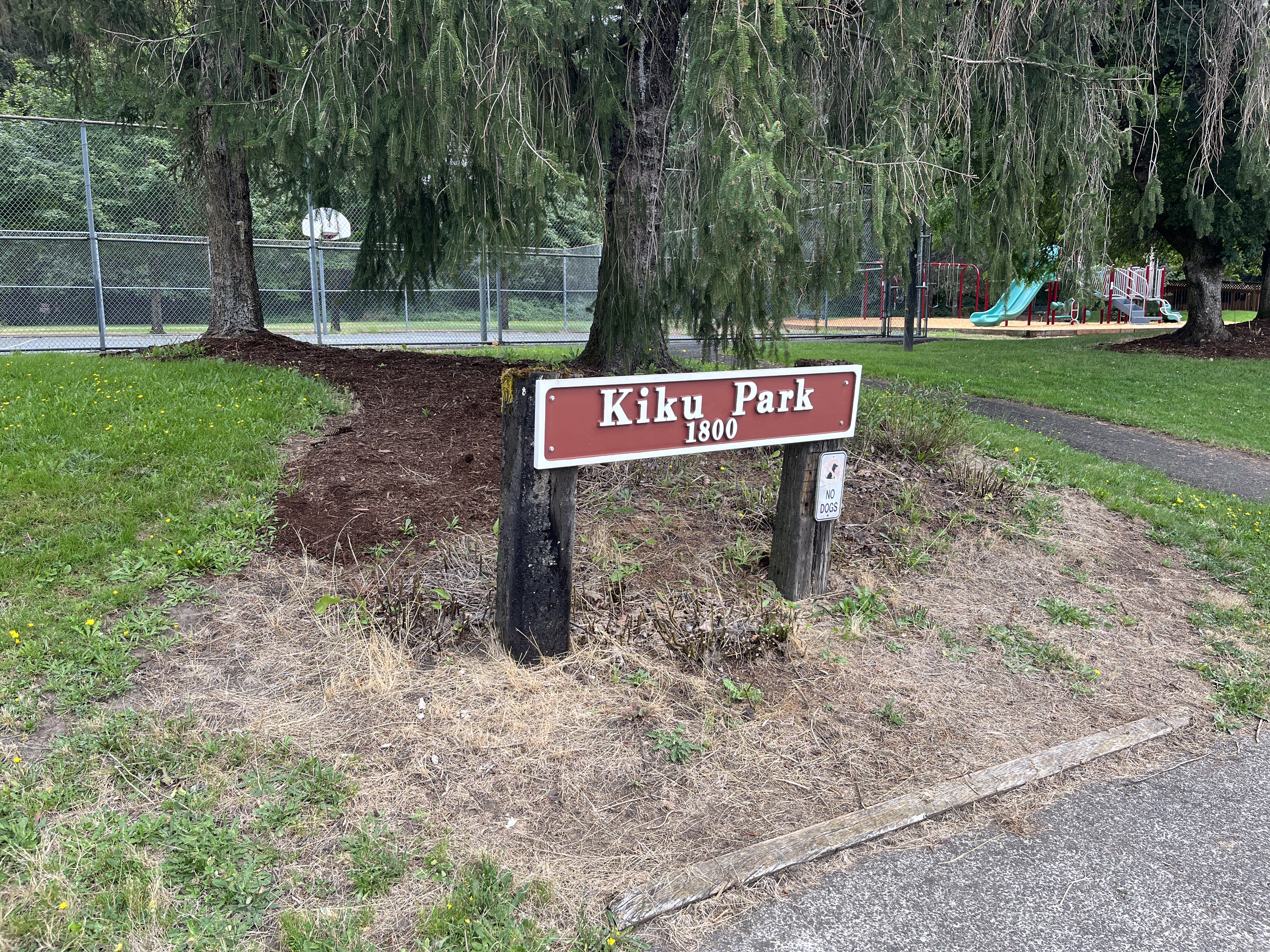
- Park sign, 2022
- Interactive map of Kiku Park
- Location: Troutdale, Oregon, U.S.
- Coordinates: 45°31′43″N 122°22′51″W
- Area: 2.62 acres (1.06 ha)

Kiku Park is a 2.62-acre (1.06 ha) public park in Troutdale, Oregon, United States.

Dedicated in 1983, the park features a basketball court and a playground most recently upgraded in 2021. In 2017, bat boxes were installed in the park in an effort to control the mosquito population.
