= Glenn Otto Park =

Public park in Troutdale, Oregon, U.S.

Glenn Community Otto Park
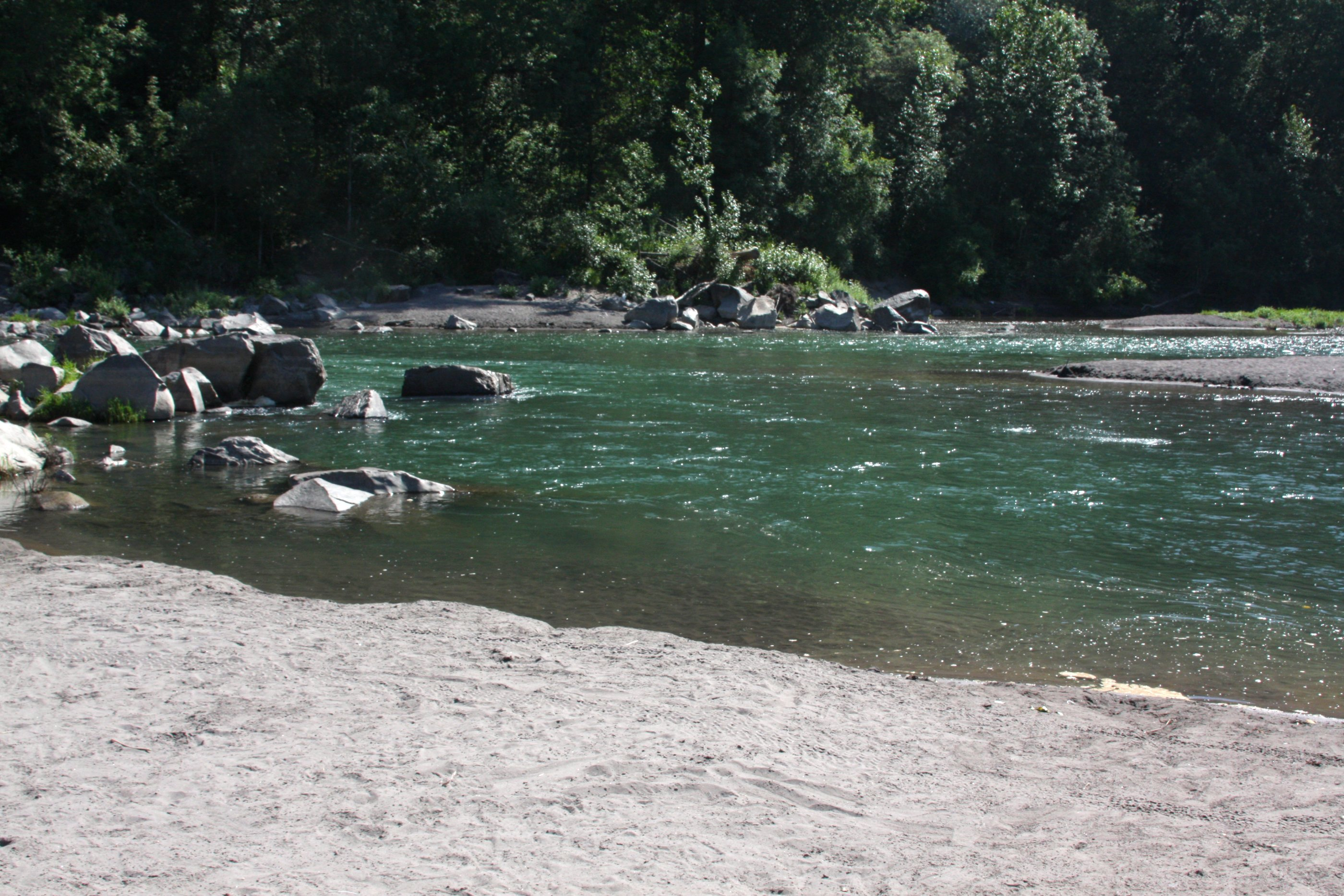
- Glenn Otto Park

- Location within Oregon
- Type: Public, municipal
- Location: Multnomah County, Oregon
- Nearest city: Troutdale
- Coordinates: 45°32′12″N 122°22′38″W
- Operator: City of Troutdale

Glenn Otto Community Park is a 6.38-acre (2.58 ha) park in Troutdale in the U.S. state of Oregon. It is the most heavily used park in the Troutdale park system. The park is at 1102 E. Historic Columbia River Hwy, Troutdale, OR 97060

The park is along the Sandy River and Beaver Creek. Several drownings have occurred along the river. A community organization has subsequently partnered with the city to provide lifeguard services.

The park named was changed from Troutdale Community Park to Glenn Otto Park in 1995 in honor a former mayor of Troutdale, Glenn Otto.
