= Open Door Christian Academy =

Location
- 27710 SE Strebin Road; Troutdale, Multnomah County, Oregon 97060; United States
- Coordinates: 45.505886°N 122.37716°W

Information
- Type: Private
- Opened: 1978
- Principal: Robert Heflin
- Grades: K-12
- Enrollment: 290
- Colors: Royal blue and white
- Athletics conference: OSAA The Valley 10 League 1A-1
- Mascot: Huskies
- Affiliation: Baptist
- Website: School website

Open Door Christian Academy is a private, co-educational Christian school in Troutdale, Oregon, United States. It was founded in 1978 as a ministry of Open Door Baptist Church and serves students in grades K-12.
