= Visionary Park =

Park in Troutdale, Oregon, U.S.

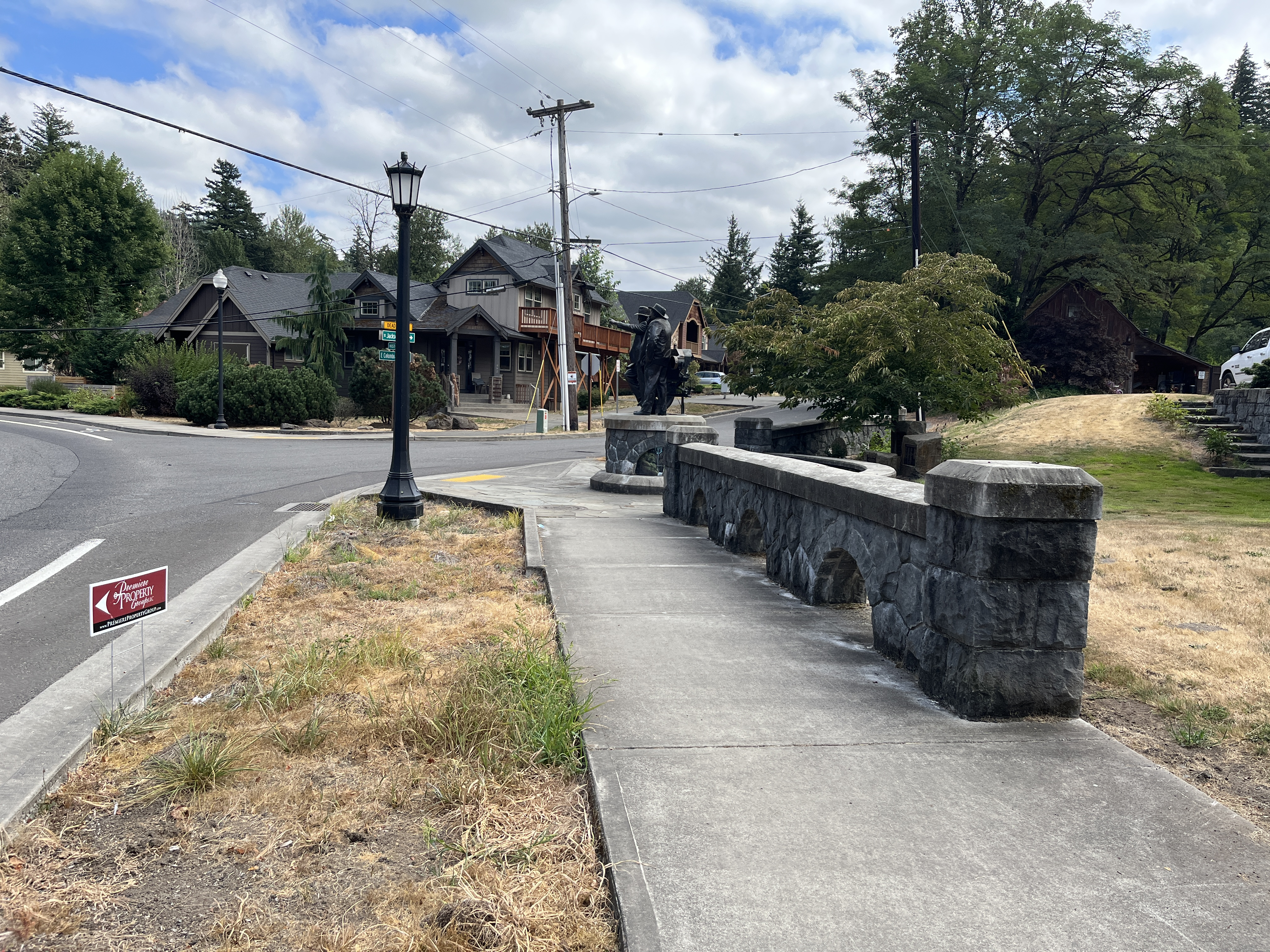
- The park in 2022
- Interactive map of Visionary Park
- Location: Troutdale, Oregon, U.S.
- Coordinates: 45°32′13.3″N 122°22′50.7″W

Visionary Park is a public park in Troutdale, Oregon, United States. The park features Rip Caswell's 2016 sculpture Devoted Passion, which commemorates Sam Hill and Sam Lancaster.

== Gallery ==
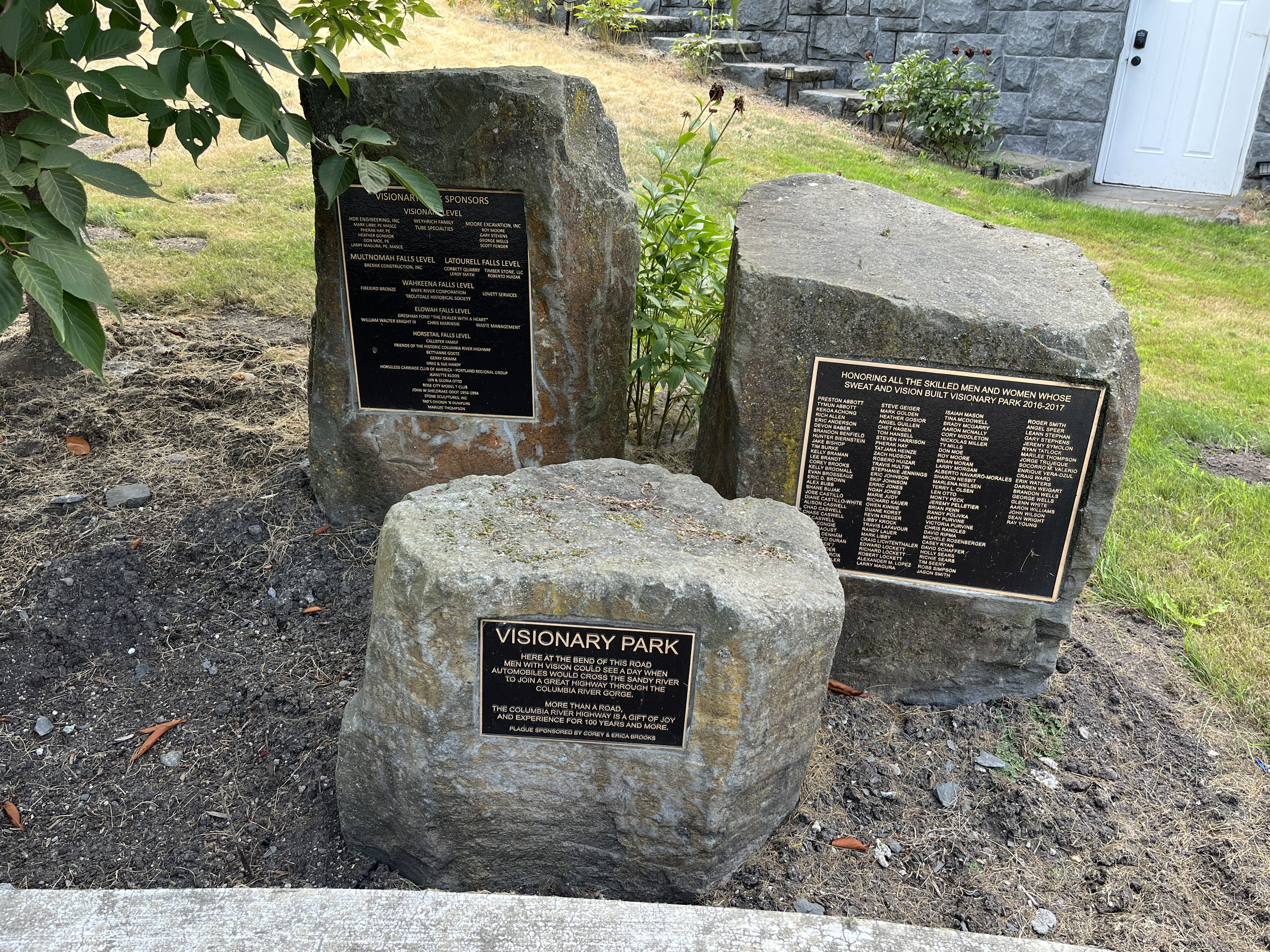
Plaques

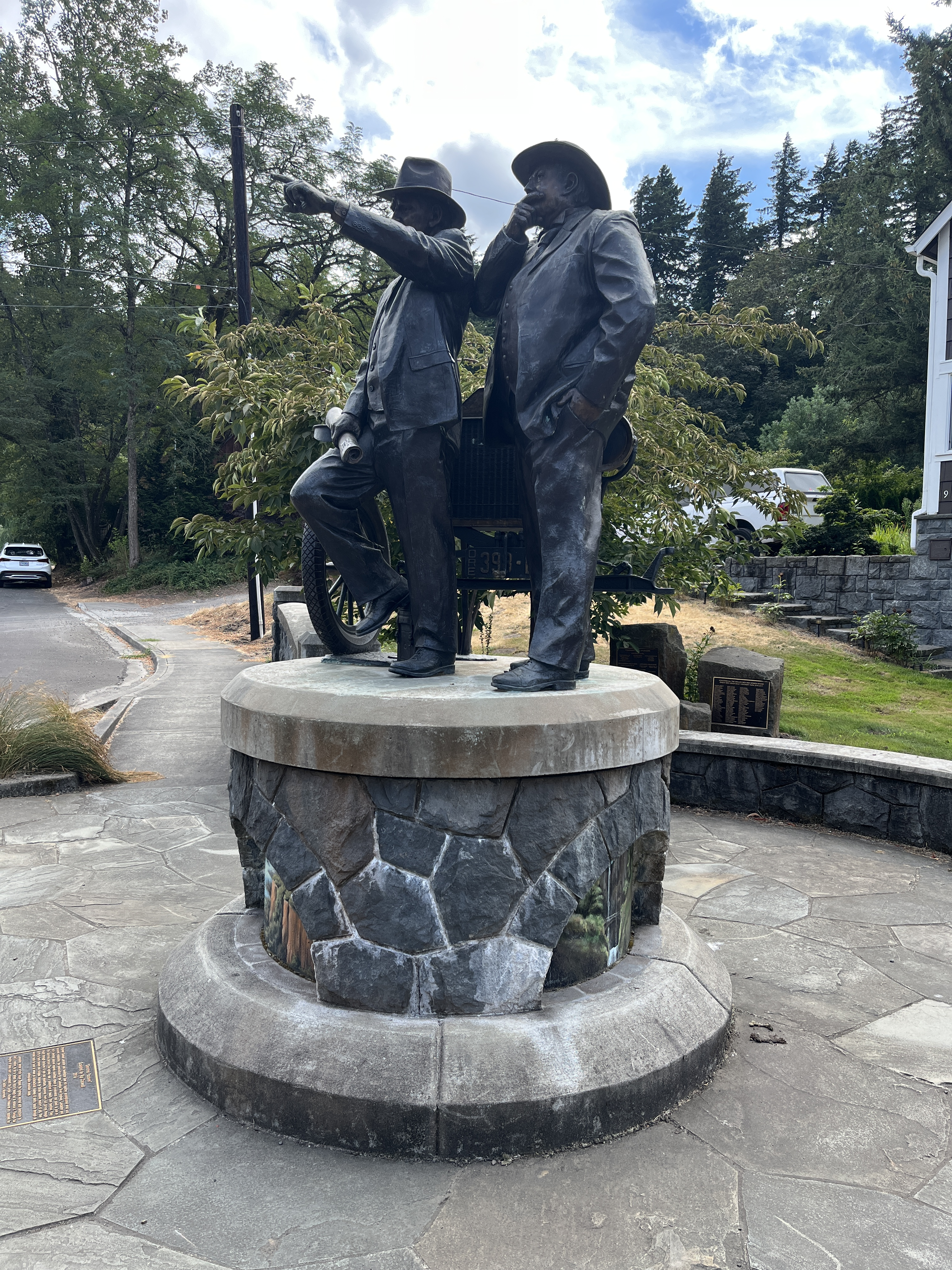
Devoted Passion

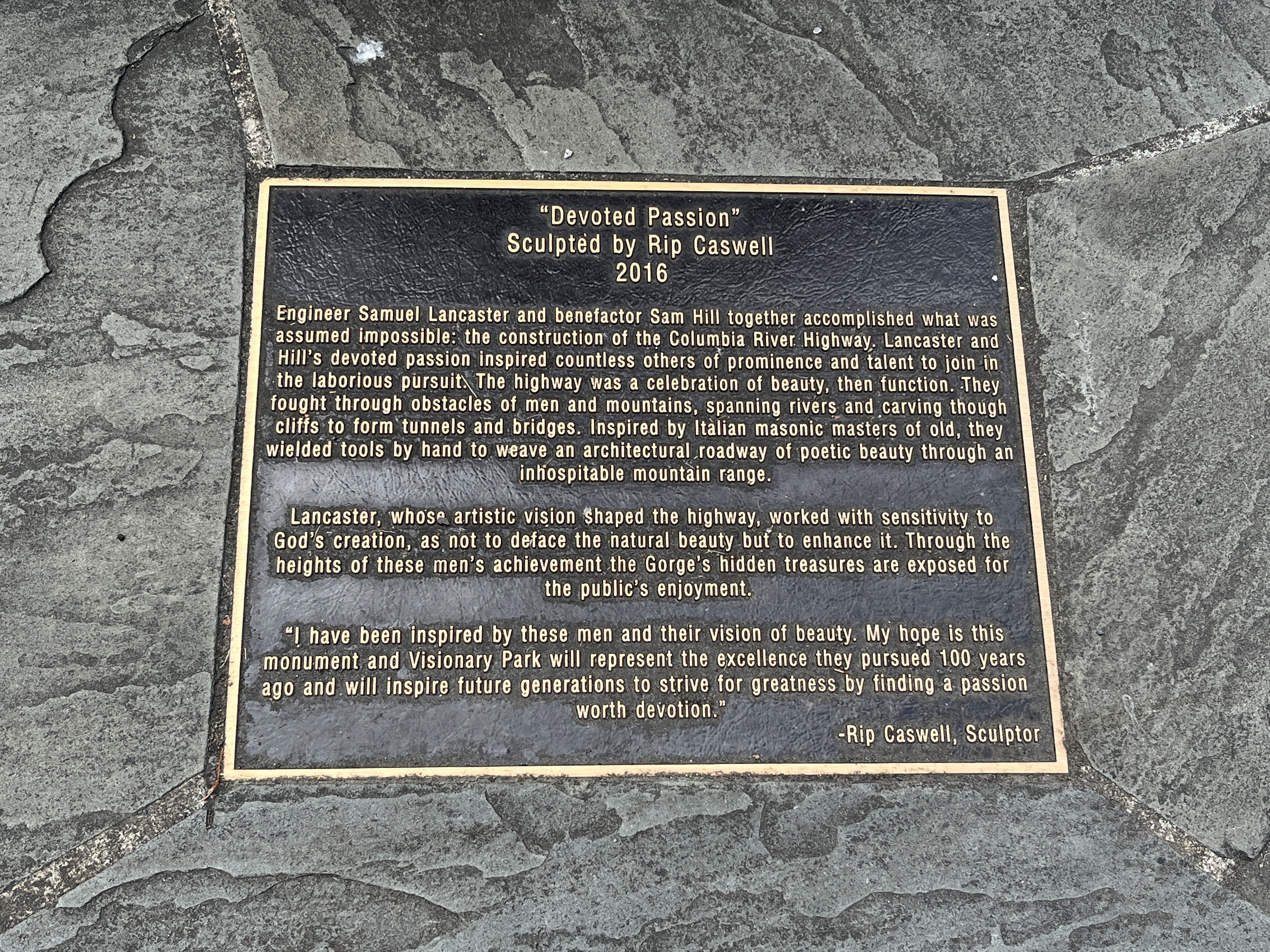
Plaque for the sculpture
