= Weedin Park =

Public park in Troutdale, Oregon, U.S.

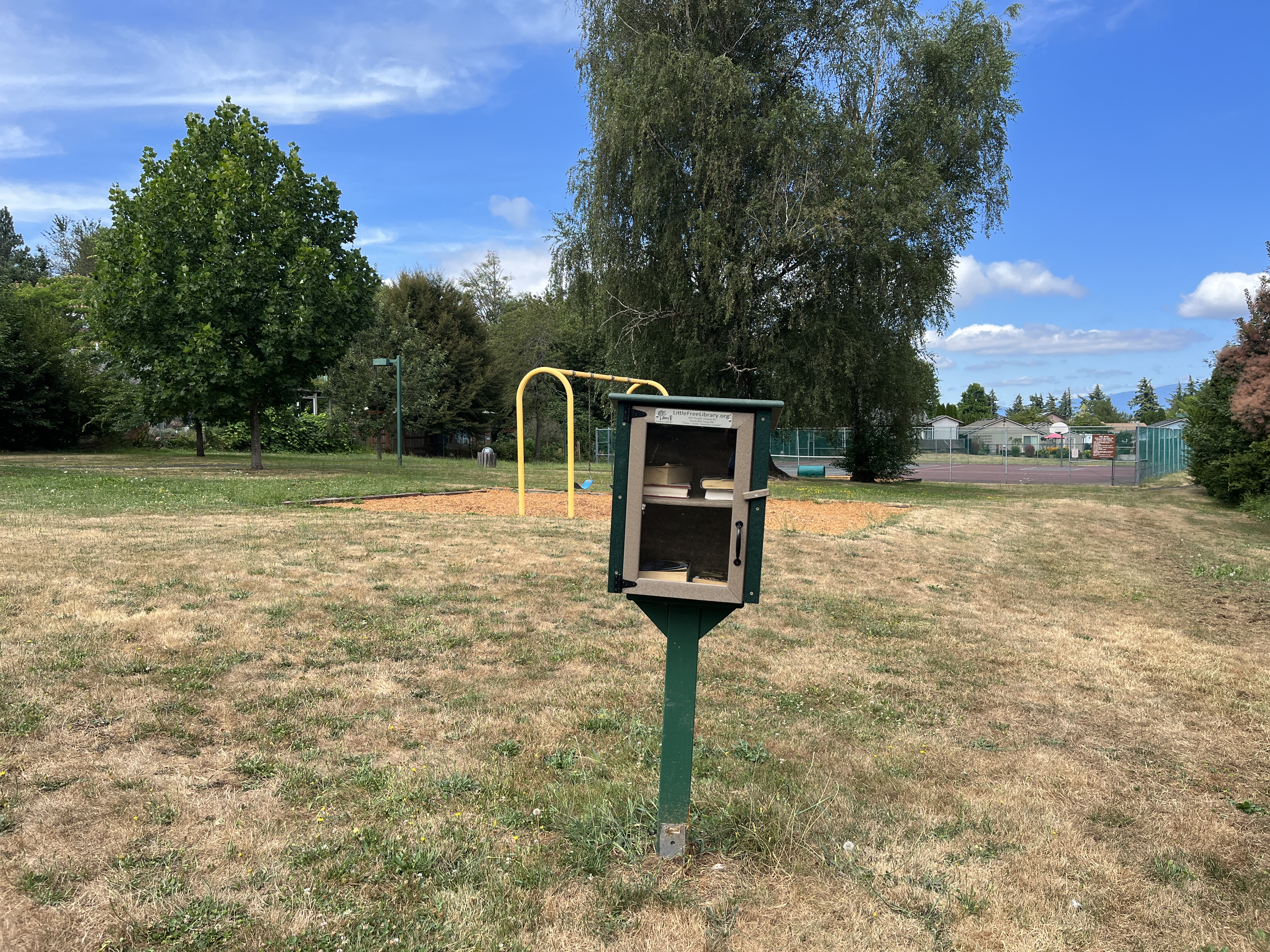
- The park in 2022
- Interactive map of Weedin Park
- Location: Troutdale, Oregon, U.S.
- Coordinates: 45°31′55″N 122°23′1″W

Weedin Park is a public park in Troutdale, Oregon, United States. Developers of the Weedin Addition Subdivision dedicated the park in 1980.
