= Troutdale Centennial Arch =

Arch in Troutdale, Oregon, U.S.

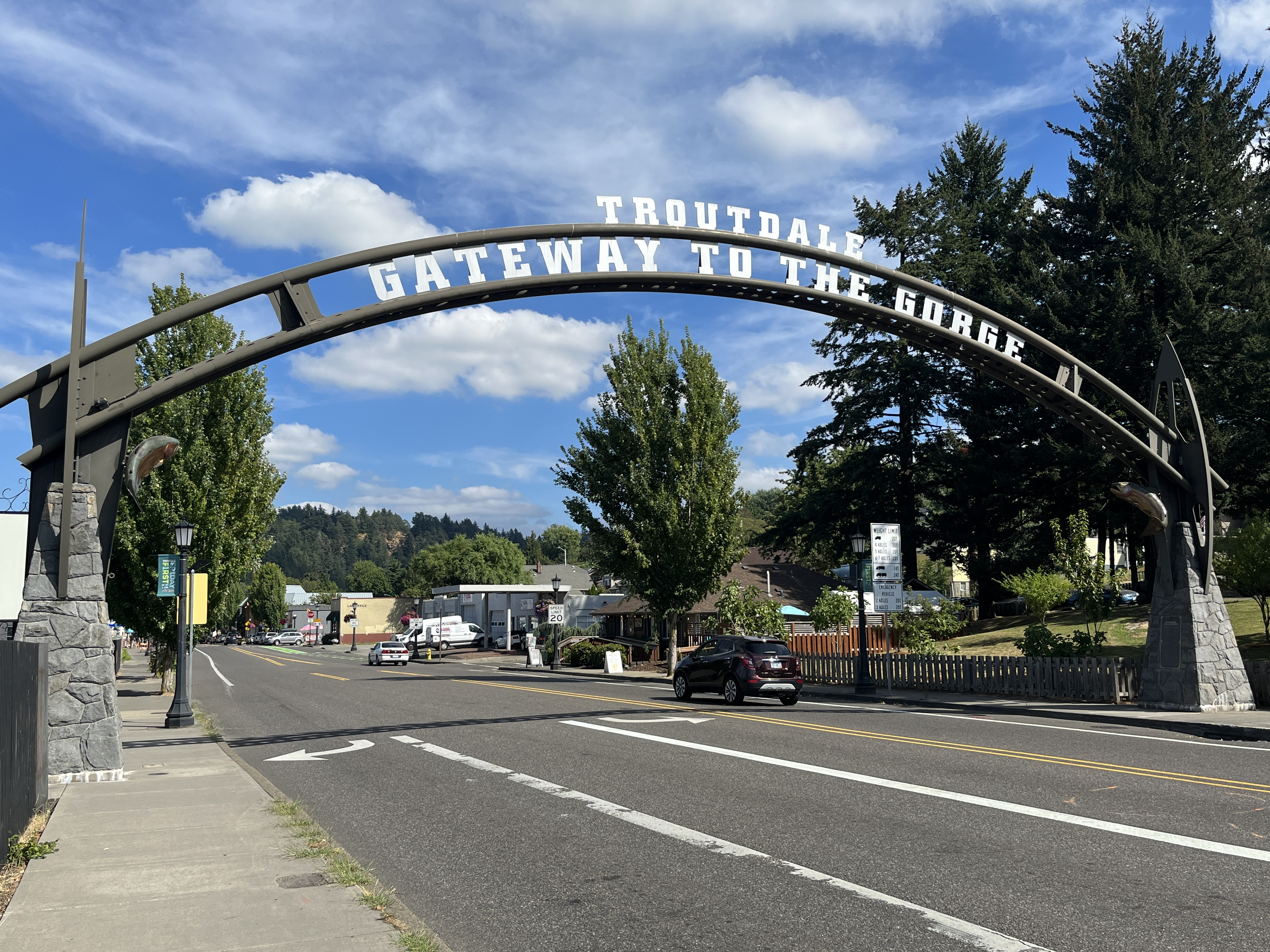
- The arch in 2022
- Location: Troutdale, Oregon, U.S.; 45°32′27″N 122°23′24″W

The Troutdale Centennial Arch is a 60-foot (18 m) arch spanning the Historic Columbia River Highway in Troutdale, Oregon, United States. The arch rests on piers created by Michael Byrne and has bronze sculptures of salmon by Rip Caswell.
