= College Nature Park =

Park in Troutdale, Oregon, U.S.

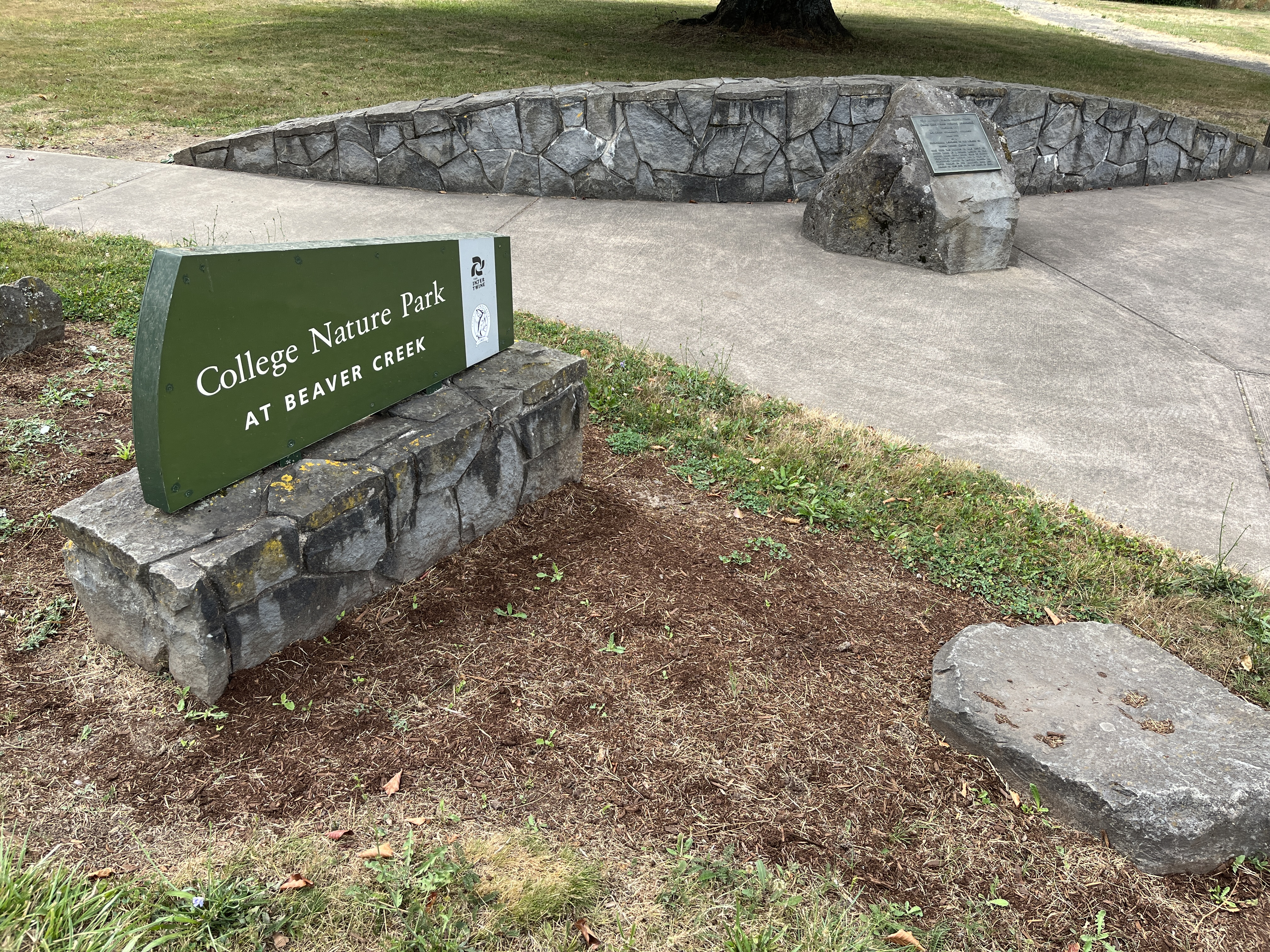
- Park sign, 2022
- Interactive map of College Nature Park
- Location: Troutdale, Oregon, U.S.
- Coordinates: 45°31′7″N 122°23′15″W

College Nature Park is a park in Troutdale, Oregon, United States. The 62-acre (25 ha) is adjacent to Mt. Hood Community College.

== Gallery ==
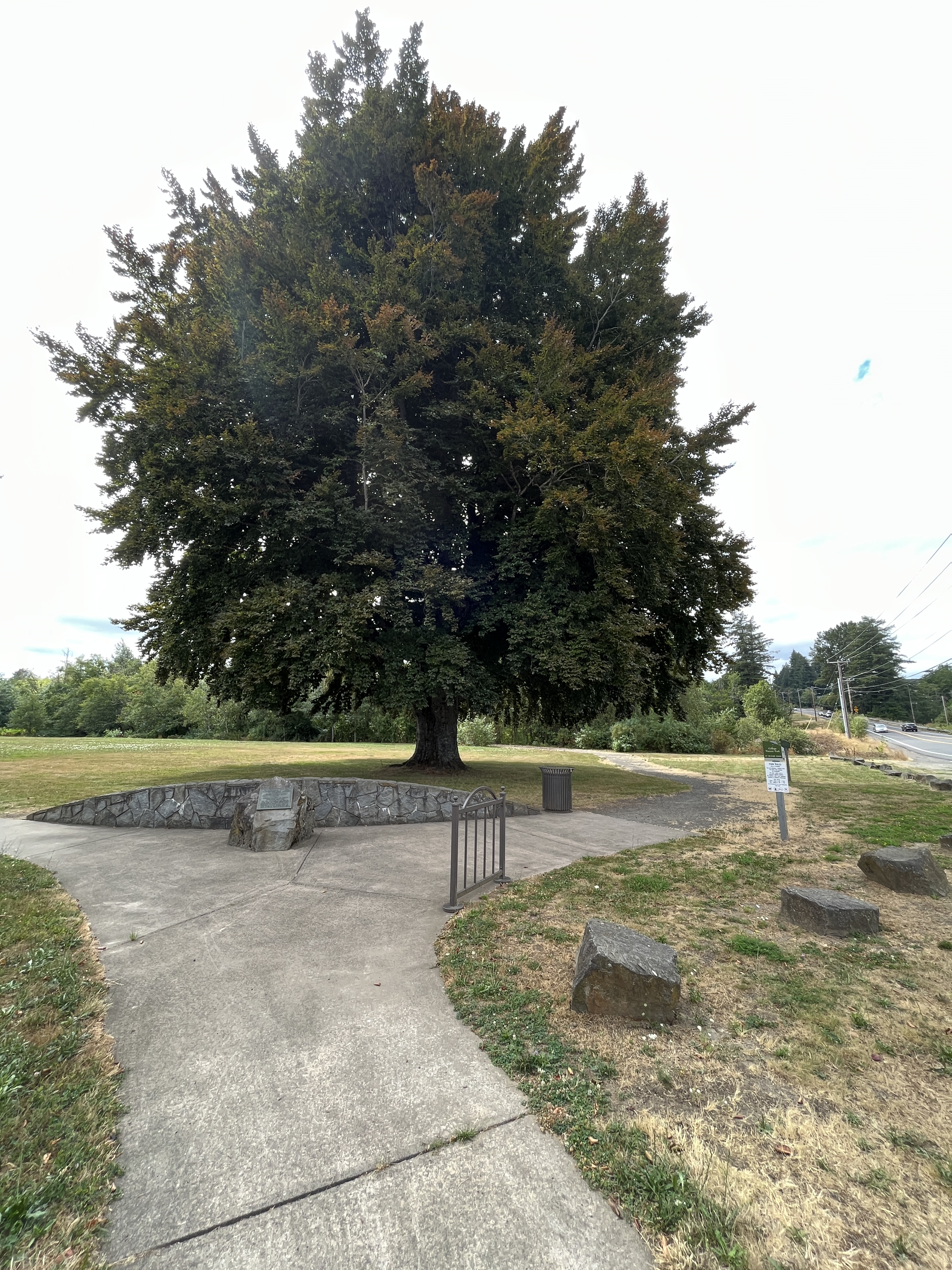
Alfred Baker Beech tree, 2022

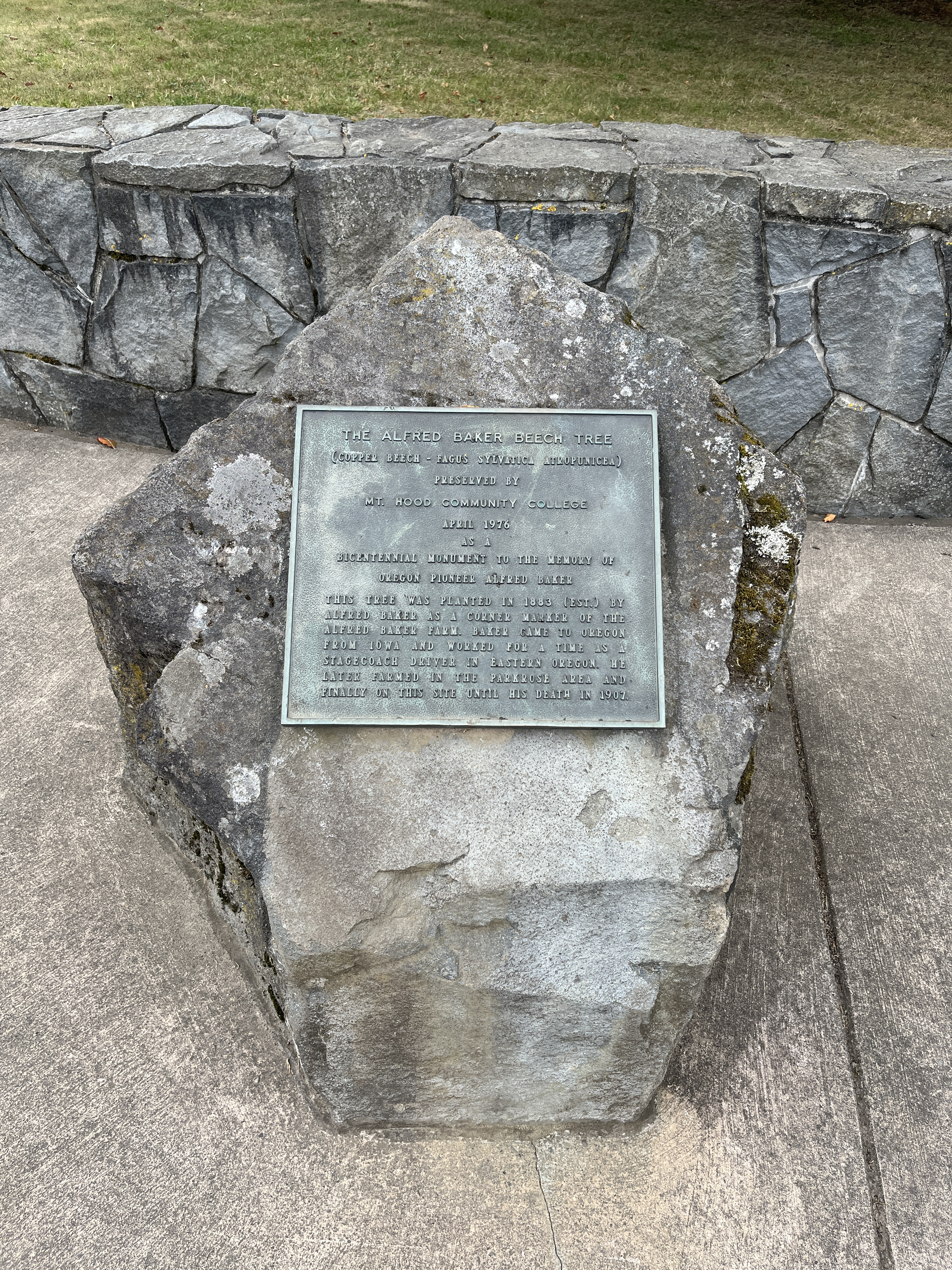
Plaque for the tree

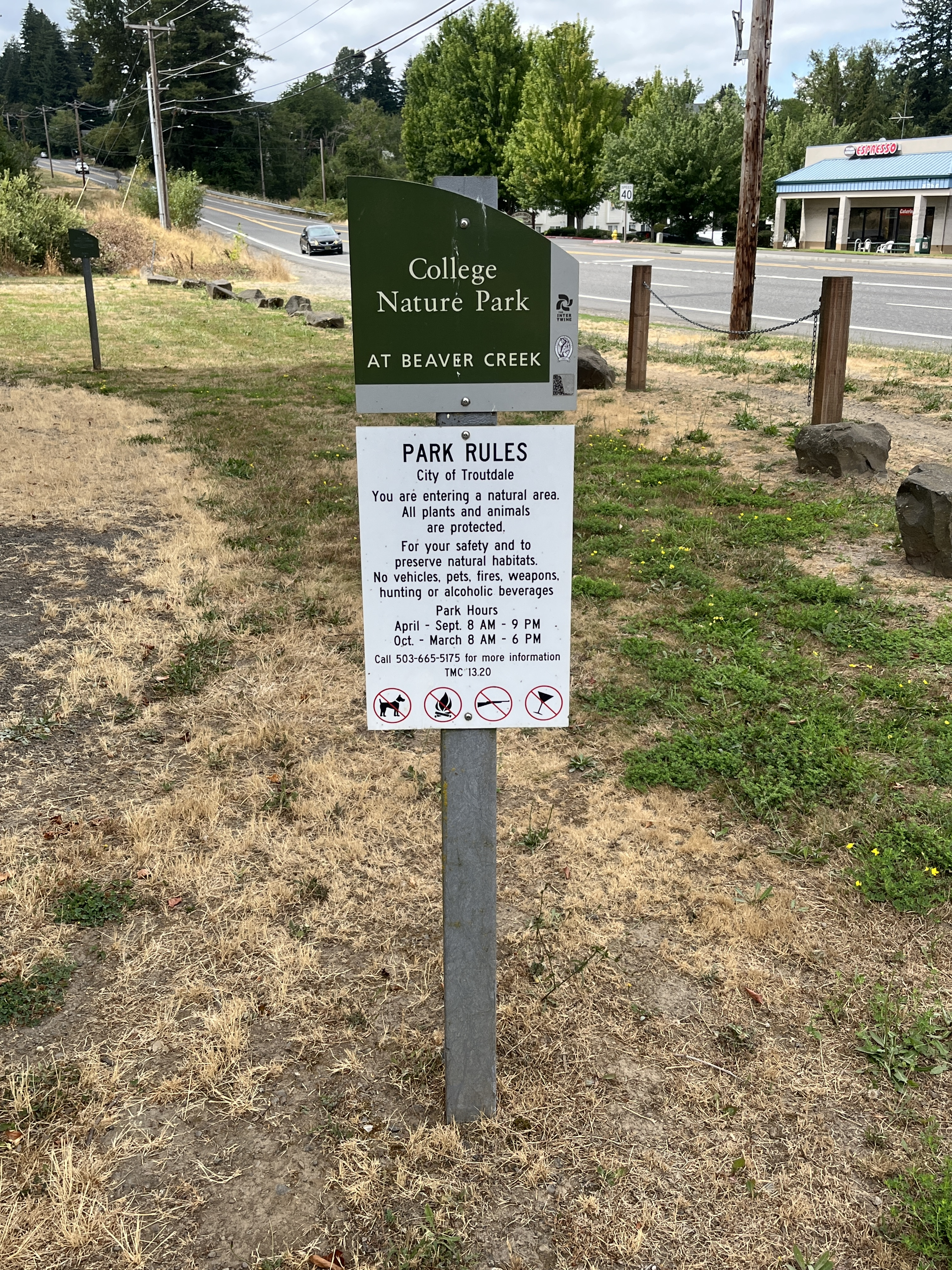
Park rules sign
