= Clara Latourell Larsson =

American activist and politician

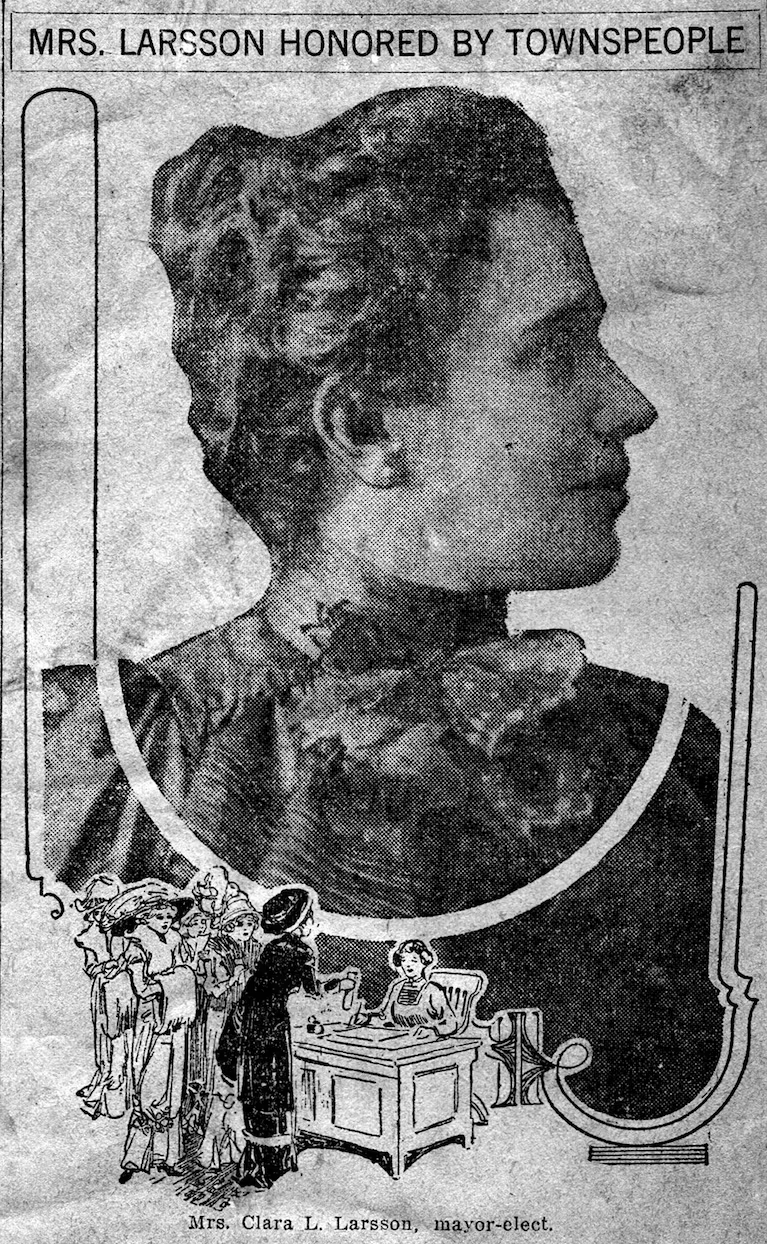
- An image of Larsson in the December 7, 1913, edition of the Oregon Sunday Journal.
- Born: 1875; Latourell, Oregon, United States
- Died: June 23, 1939 (aged 63–64)
- Known for: First female and Native American mayor of Troutdale, Oregon

Clara Latourell Larsson (1875 – June 23, 1939) was an activist and politician in Oregon. In 1913, she was elected as the first female and first Native American mayor of Troutdale, Oregon, becoming only the second woman to serve as mayor statewide.

== Early life ==
Clara Latourell was born in 1875 in Latourell, Oregon, a town founded by her "Gorge Royalty" family. She was also part-Indigenous through her grandmother Betsy White Wing, a Yakama woman from a village near what today is Washougal, Washington.

She settled in Troutdale and married local "scoundrel" Arch Young, who abandoned her. After the couple's divorce, she remarried saloon owner John Larsson. Her two children both became ill and died at a young age.

== Political career ==
Larsson became heavily involved in public life in Troutdale, serving as a clerk for the local school board. She also taught music at the city's school.

In 1912, women in Oregon gained the right to vote in elections within the state. A year later, in December 1913, Larsson defeated incumbent S.A. Edmunson, a saloonkeeper, by five votes to become mayor of Troutedale. When she took office in 1914, she became the city's first female mayor, as well as only the second female mayor statewide, after Clara C. Munson of Warrenton. She was also Troutdale's first Native American mayor.

Larsson served as a "voice of reason" in a rowdy saloon town, establishing the city's first library and its first speed limit, 15 miles per hour. She also spearheaded the city's rebuilding after parts of the area were damaged in a 1915 fire. She governed during the Temperance movement and Prohibition, overseeing—perhaps against her will—the shutdown of the city's saloons, including her own husband's, in 1915. The loss of income from saloon licensing fees forced the town to begin issuing taxes for the first time.

Larsson was re-elected and served two terms as mayor. Then, in 1924, her friend and fellow female activist Laura Bullock Harlow was elected to succeed her. However, Larsson remained in public office as a member of the Troutdale City Council, where she continued to serve until her death.

== Death and legacy ==
Larsson died in 1939.

Decades later, Troutdale erected a life-size bronze statue of Larsson, sculpted by Marlena Nielsen, in its Mayors Square.
