= Lewellyn Park =

Public park in Troutdale, Oregon, U.S.

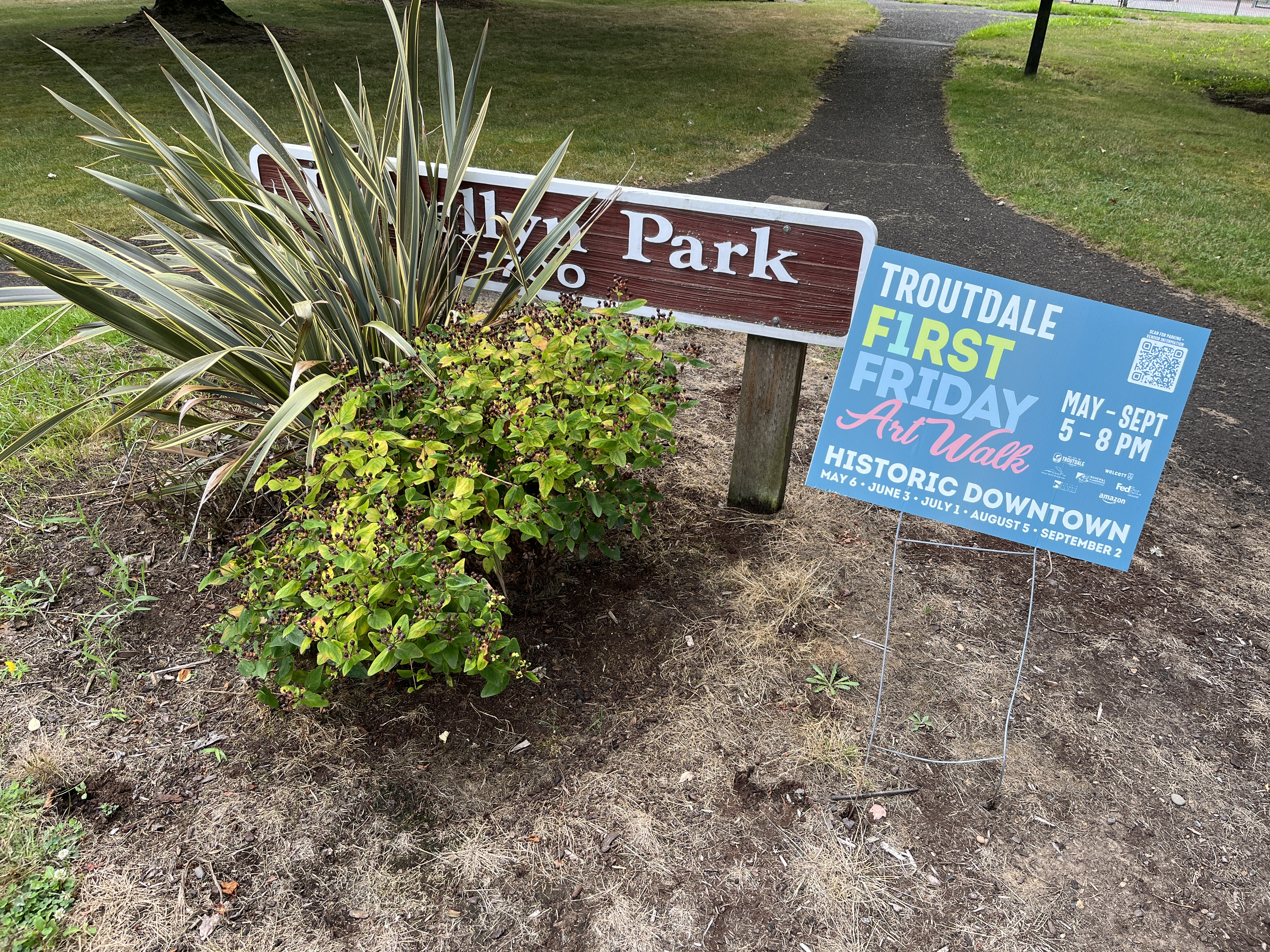
- Park sign, 2022
- Interactive map of Lewellyn Park
- Location: Troutdale, Oregon, U.S.
- Coordinates: 45°31′42″N 122°22′33″W

Lewellyn Park is a public park in Troutdale, Oregon, United States. The 2.39-acre (0.97 ha) park was dedicated by developers of Sandee Palisades Subdivision in February 1981.
