= Columbia Park (Troutdale, Oregon) =

Public park in Troutdale, Oregon, U.S.

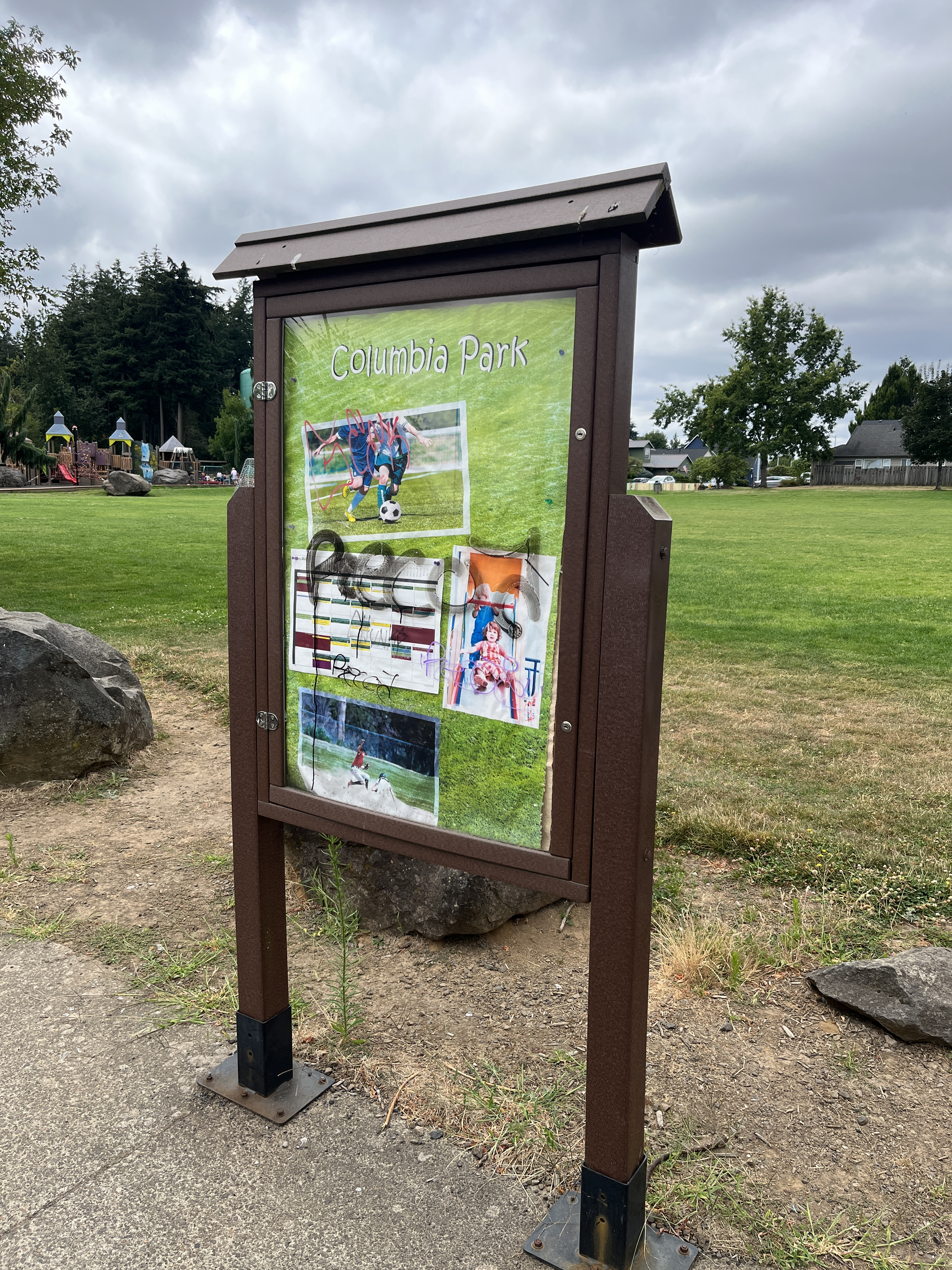
- Park sign, 2022
- Interactive map of Columbia Park
- Location: Troutdale, Oregon, U.S.
- Coordinates: 45°31′40″N 122°24′20″W
- Area: 19.9 acres (8.1 ha)

Columbia Park is a 19.9-acre (8.1 ha) public park in Troutdale, Oregon, United States. The park houses a large playground called Imagination Station.
