= Helen Althaus Park =

Public park in Troutdale, Oregon, U.S.

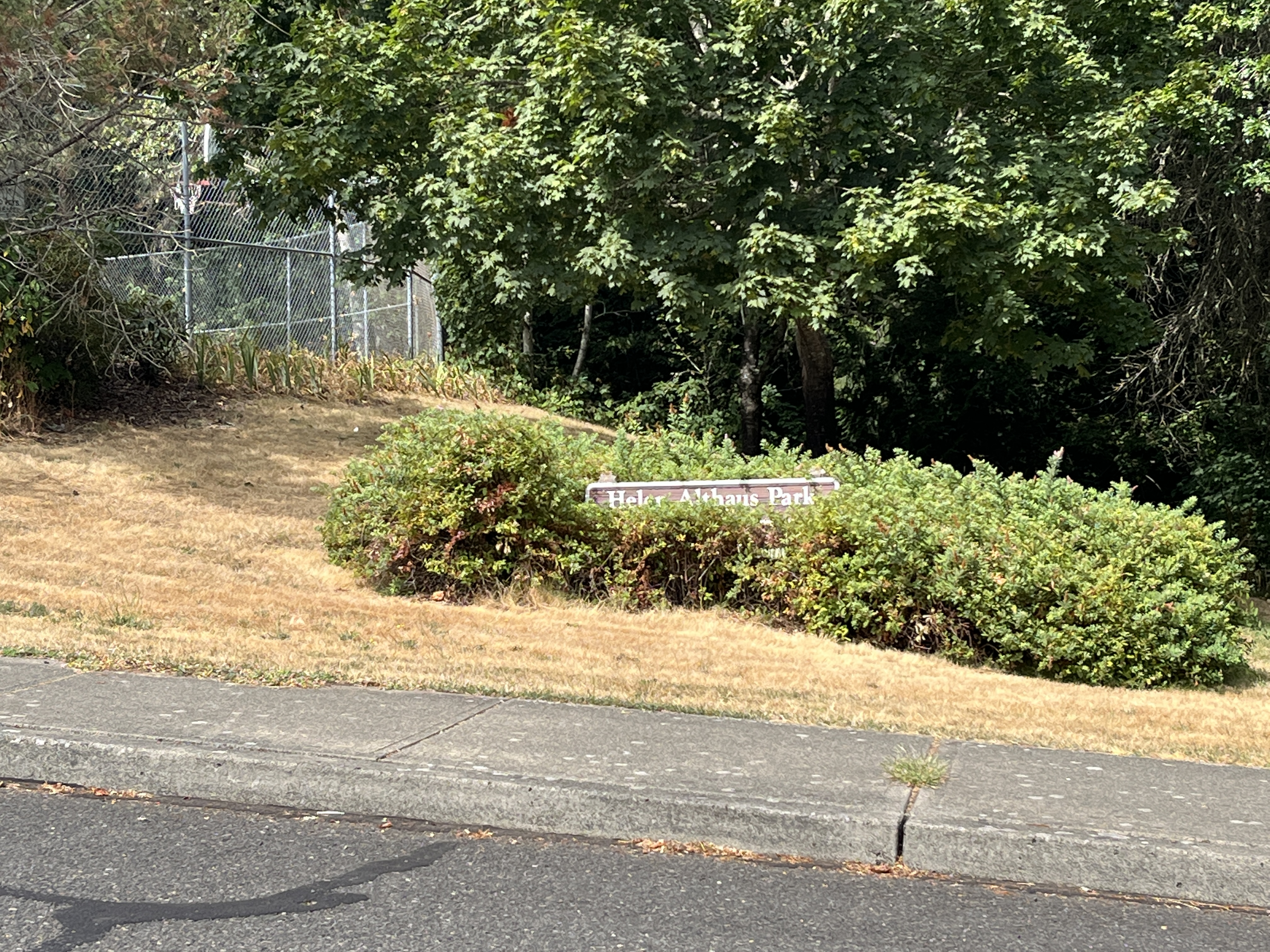
- Park sign, 2022
- Interactive map of Helen Althaus Park
- Location: Troutdale, Oregon, U.S.
- Coordinates: 45°32′14″N 122°23′27″W
- Area: 9.51 acres (3.85 ha)

Helen Althaus Park (formerly Watershed Park) is a 9.51-acre (3.85 ha) public park in Troutdale, Oregon, United States. Named after former city council member Helen Althaus, the park has a large underground reservoir which has been covered with a basketball court.

In 2015, Oregon Fish and Wildlife was notified of the presence of a cougar in the park.

== Gallery ==
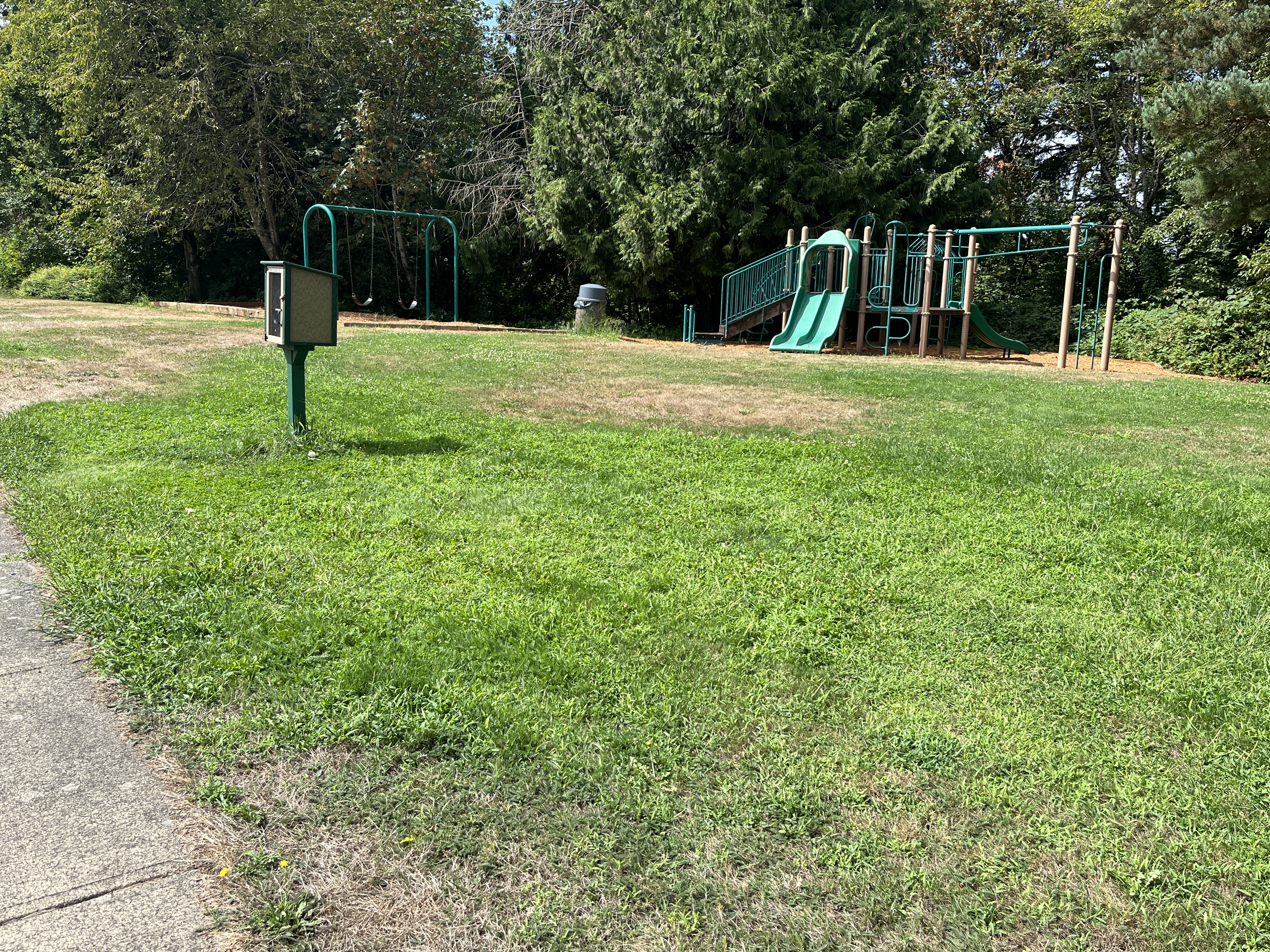
Playground

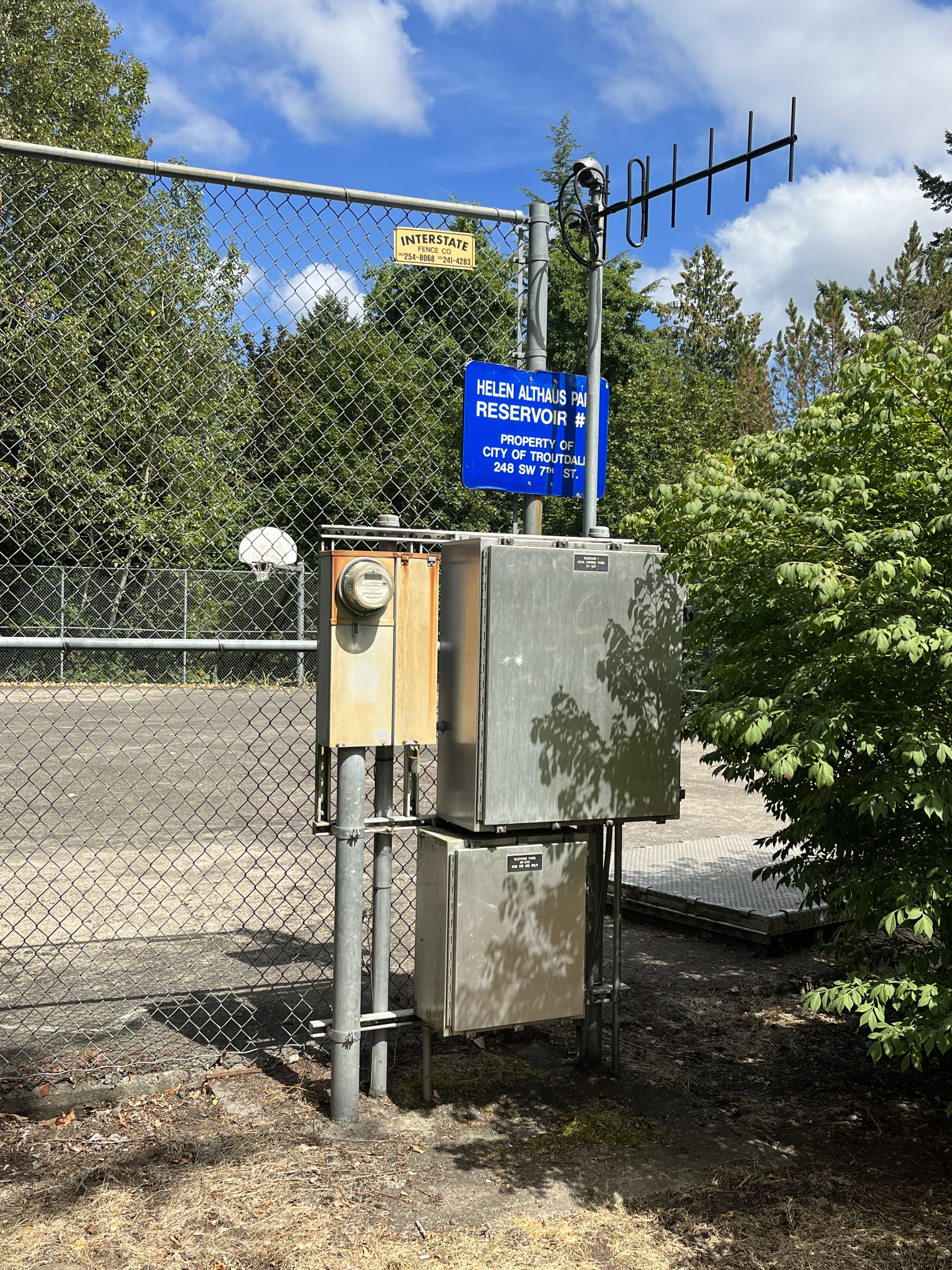
Reservoir

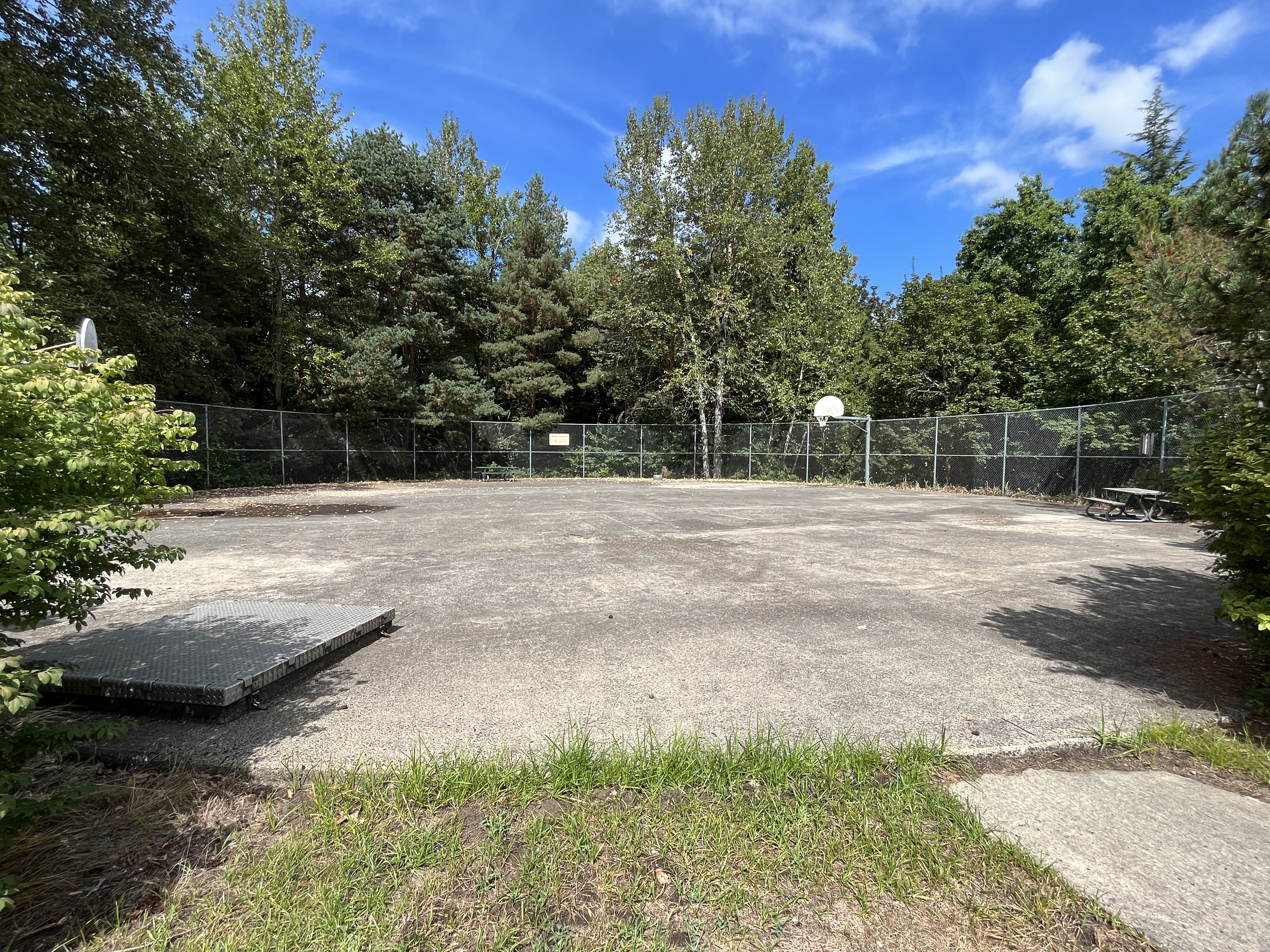
Basketball court
