= Depot Rail Museum =

Museum in Troutdale, Oregon, U.S.

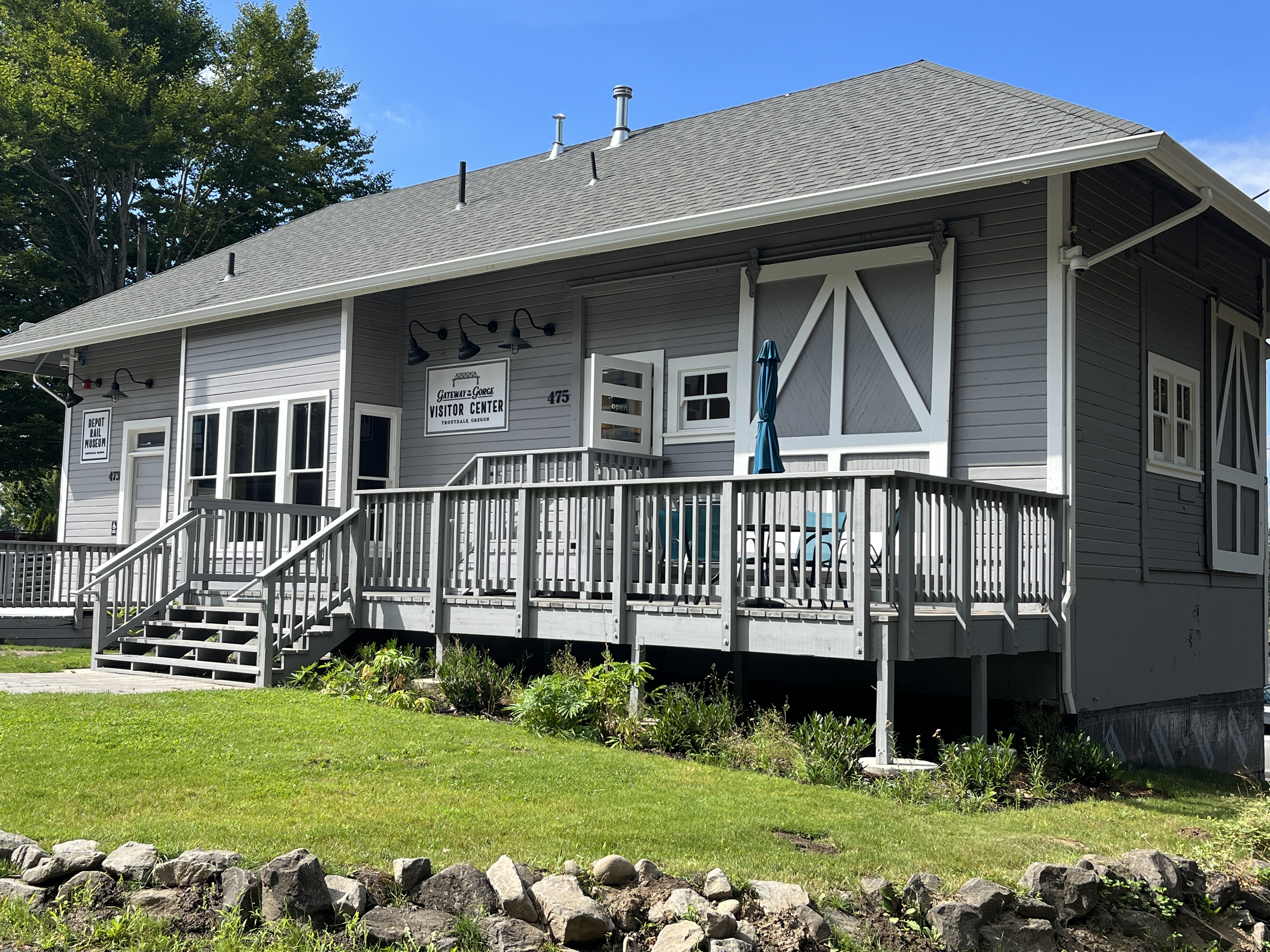
- The museum's exterior, 2022
- Location: Troutdale, Oregon, United States
- Coordinates: 45°32′27.5″N 122°23′3.5″W

The Depot Rail Museum is a museum in Troutdale, Oregon, United States. The building houses the Gateway to the Gorge Visitor Center.

== See also ==
- Depot Park
