= Mayors Square =

Public park in Troutdale, Oregon, U.S.

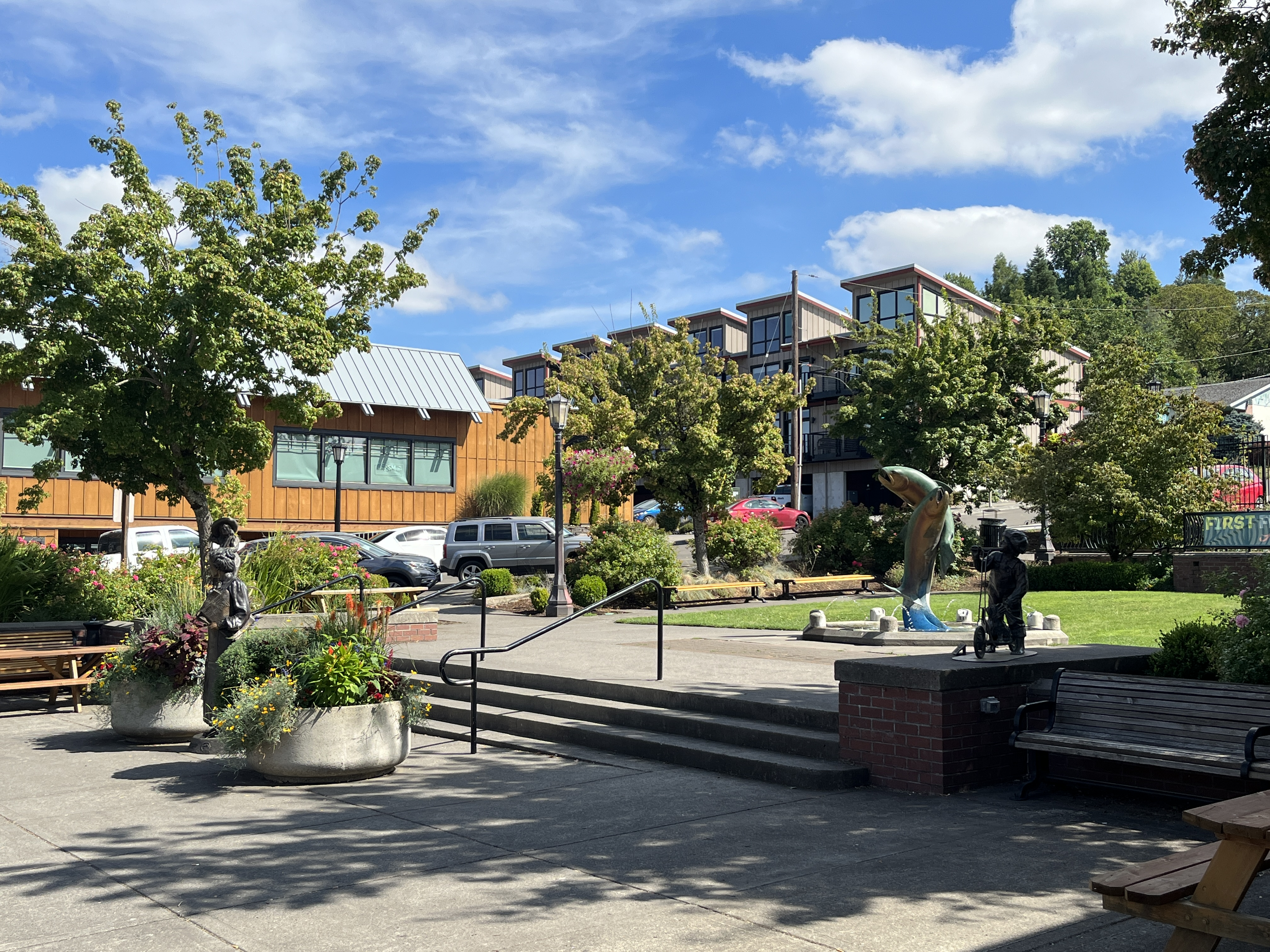
- The square in 2022
- Interactive map of Mayors Square
- Location: Troutdale, Oregon, U.S.
- Coordinates: 45°32′26″N 122°23′15″W
- Area: .17 acres (0.069 ha)

Mayors Square is a .17-acre (0.069 ha) public square and park in Troutdale, Oregon, United States. The park has a statue depicting former mayor Clara Latourell Larsson, and has been the site of the city's holiday tree and lighting ceremony.
