= Woodale Park =

Public park in Troutdale, Oregon, U.S.

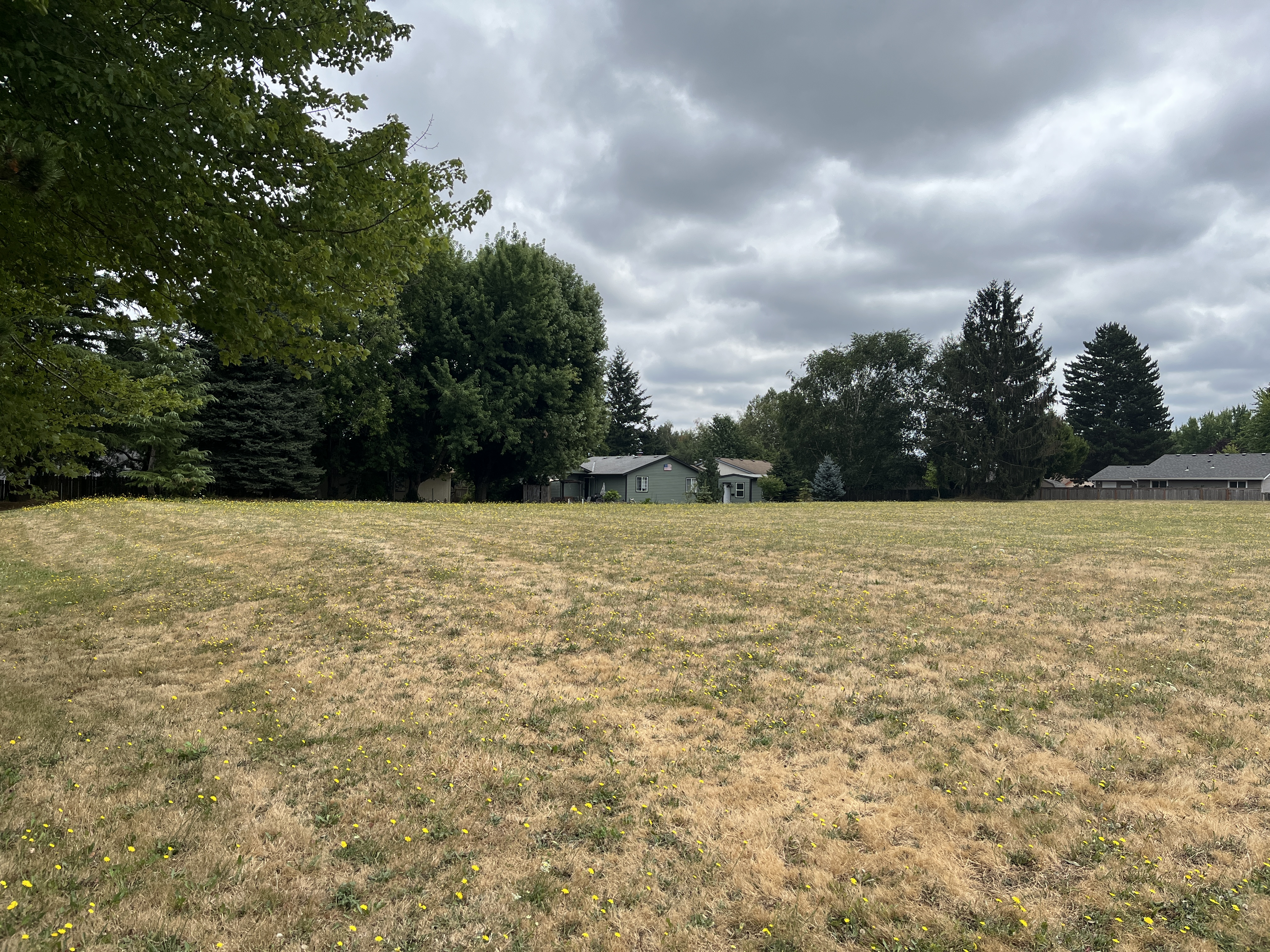
- 2022
- Interactive map of Woodale Park
- Location: Troutdale, Oregon, U.S.
- Coordinates: 45°31′31″N 122°24′38″W
- Area: 2.5 acres (1.0 ha)

Woodale Park is a 2.5-acre (1.0 ha) public park in Troutdale, Oregon, United States. The land was acquired through a tax foreclosure and dedicated to the city by Multnomah County in 1992.
