= Samuel Bissinger =

American merchant (1825–1897)

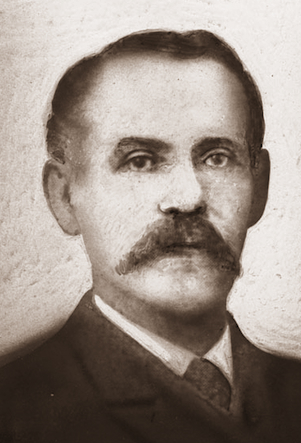
Samuel Bissinger (c. 1875)

Sampson "Samuel" Bissinger (1825–1897) was a successful merchant, friend of President Andrew Johnson, and an uncle of newspaper publisher Adolph Simon Ochs. Bissinger is considered one of the leaders of early Jewish life in Tennessee.

== Biography ==
Sampson "Samuel" Bissinger was born in Ichenhausen, Bavaria, to Baruch Benedig Bissinger (1783–1834) and Brendel Babette (Mayer) Bissinger (1790–1856). Samuel's mother, Brendel, came from a long line of important Jewish figures in Germany and Eastern Europe. Her grandfather, Simcha Bunem Rappaport (1734–1816), was a member of the Rappaport Rabbinic Dynasty and one of 71 leaders invited to the 1807 Napoleonic Sandrehin.

With a wave of other German Jewish immigrants, Bissinger left Bavaria for the United States sometime in the early 1840s, settling in Kentucky. In 1849, he was married to Caroline "Sarah" Ochs (1821–1897). Not long after, Bissinger removed to Tennessee with his brother-in-law Julius Ochs, where he became a prominent businessman and citizen. Though most widely known for his clothing stores in Knoxville and Chattanooga, Bissinger also ran a dry goods business and small inn during the Civil War.

While President Andrew Johnson was in office, he had his suits made by Bissinger's merchant tailoring company in Knoxville. The President was a former tailor himself, and preferred to sew his buttons on personally. Bissinger and Johnson were described as "friends and cronies" in a later profile of the former, and in one of Bissinger's obituaries, it was stated his greatest accomplishment was to have made the suit Andrew Johnson was wearing when taking the Presidential oath of office. Newspapers in Tennessee also reported that President Johnson was buried in a suit made by Bissinger.

Newspaper publisher Adolph Ochs was Bissinger's nephew through his marriage to Caroline "Sarah" Ochs. Adolph Ochs would purchase the New York Times in 1896, saving it from insolvency and closure. By the 1920s, The New York Times was one of the most widely circulated newspapers in the world. Ochs first foray in publishing, however, was with a paper called the Chattanooga Dispatch. The Chattanooga Dispatch would close not long after its first issue was distributed in 1877. Destitute, Ochs stayed with Bissinger until he could get back on his feet.

In the early 1890s, Samuel Bissinger encountered various setbacks with regard to businesses he owned in Ozark, Alabama. He left many of his holdings in the hands of his children and moved with Sarah to New York City, perhaps to be closer to his daughter and nephew. Bissinger died in Brooklyn near the end of 1897 and is buried in Chattanooga, Tennessee. Adolph Ochs was a pallbearer at Bissinger's funeral, as well as the executor of his estate.

== Family and descendants ==
Samuel married Caroline "Sarah" Ochs in 1849, and lived the first years of their married life in Louisville, Kentucky. They had the following children:

- Benjamin Bissinger (b.1850) Benjamin was a prosperous inventor. Many of his sewing machine patents were used by the leading manufacturers of the day.
- Bertha (Bissinger) Felleman (b. 1857) Mother of Hazel Felleman (1884 – April 29, 1975), who was an American editor. She was the editor of New York Times Book Review Notes and Queries for 15 years, until 1955. She edited The Best Loved Poems of the American People (1936) and Poems That Live Forever (1965). [1] Both books have remained in print and have sold over one million copies.
- Nancy (Bissinger) Borges (b. 1857)
- Mathilda (Bissinger) Hyman (b. 1852)
