= Troutdale, Oregon =

- City
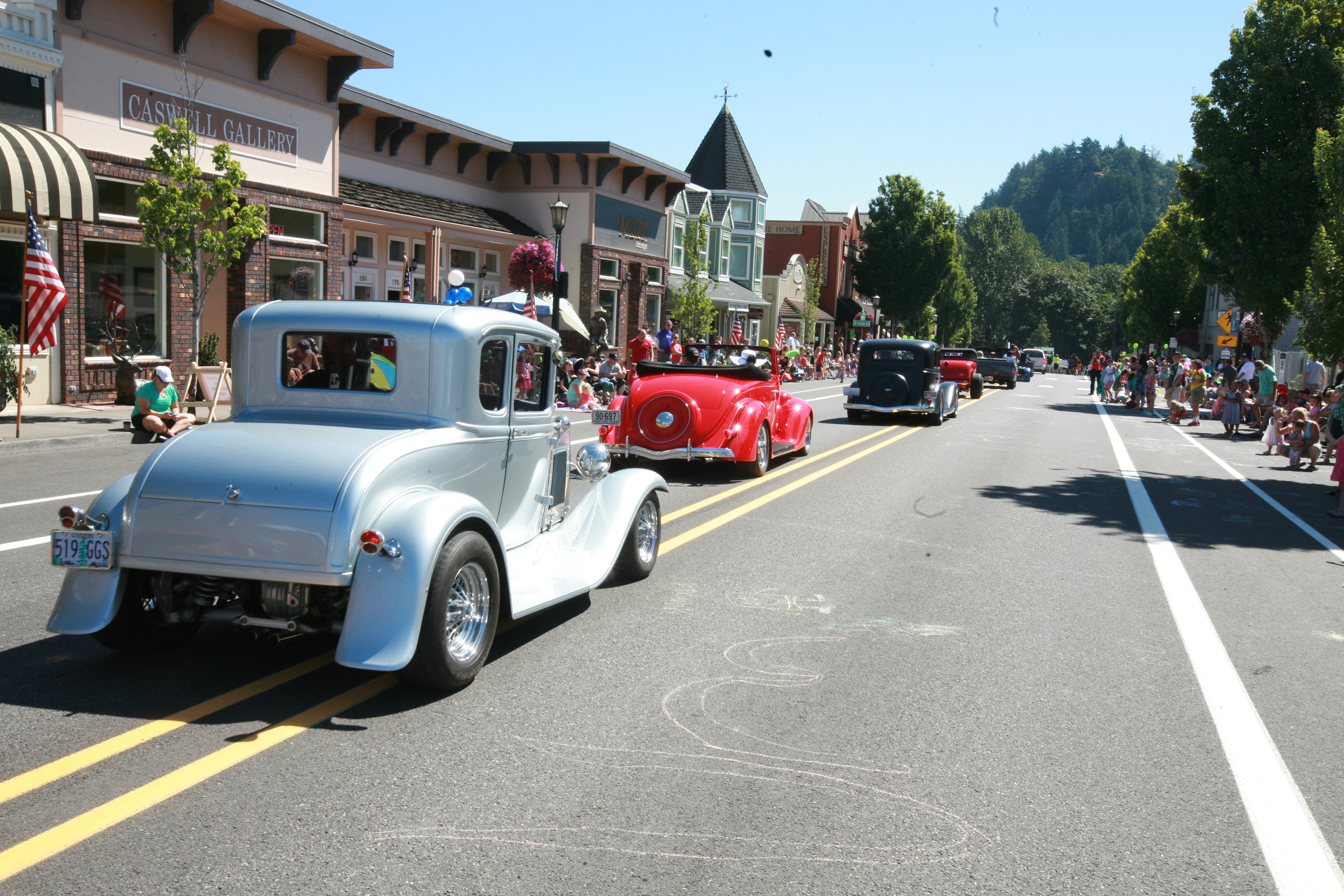
- Downtown Troutdale during SummerFest (2015)
- Interactive location map of Troutdale
- Coordinates: 45°31′46″N 122°22′30″W
- Country: United States
- State: Oregon
- County: Multnomah
- Incorporated: 1907

Government
  - Mayor: Randy Lauer

Area
  - Total: 6.03 sq mi (15.62 km^{2})
  - Land: 5.94 sq mi (15.38 km^{2})
  - Water: 0.081 sq mi (0.21 km^{2})
- Elevation: 161 ft (49 m)

Population (2020)
  - Total: 16,300
  - Density: 2,741.3/sq mi (1,058.44/km^{2})
- Time zone: UTC−8 (Pacific)
  - Summer (DST): UTC−7 (Pacific)
- ZIP code: 97060
- Area code: 503 & 971
- FIPS code: 41-74850
- GNIS feature ID: 2412098
- Website: www.troutdaleoregon.gov

Troutdale is a city in Multnomah County, Oregon, United States, immediately north of Gresham and east of Wood Village. As of the 2020 census, the city population was 16,300. The city serves as the western gateway to the Historic Columbia River Highway, the Mount Hood Scenic Byway, and the Columbia River Gorge. It is approximately 12 miles (19 km) east of Portland and is part of the Portland, Oregon metropolitan area.

== History ==
The community was once known as Sandy, after the nearby Sandy River; the post office in Sandy was established in 1854 and closed in 1868. In 1873, the current city of Sandy in Clackamas County, which was formerly named "Revenue", established a different Sandy post office that is still in operation. Troutdale was named by pioneer John Harlow for the trout pond in a dale near his house. Troutdale post office was founded in 1880. In 1925, a company, the Bissinger Wool Pullery, was moved from Sellwood, Oregon, and opened for business on Macadam Road along the west bank of the Sandy River. An iconic water tower stands nearby. The company was featured in a Ripley's Believe it or Not! column because a cat was reportedly found in a stack of animal hides that the company was going to use for its products. The cat was taken care of and became the company's mascot, and was said to have lived a long and healthy life.

Reynolds Aluminum was once the area's biggest employer. The Reynolds plant in Troutdale was established in 1941 to provide aluminum for the war effort. The plant closed in 2000. The nearby city of Wood Village was a company town founded to house workers from the Reynolds plant.

== Geography ==
According to the United States Census Bureau, the city has a total area of 6.02 square miles (15.59 km^{2}), of which 5.94 square miles (15.38 km^{2}) is land and 0.08 square miles (0.21 km^{2}) is water.

Troutdale is located at the confluence of the Sandy and Columbia rivers.

The city is about 12 miles (19 km) east of Portland.

=== Climate ===
This region experiences warm (but not hot) and dry summers, with no average monthly temperatures above 71.6 °F (22 °C). According to the Köppen climate classification system, Troutdale has a warm-summer Mediterranean climate, abbreviated "Csb" on climate maps.

Troutdale is renowned for having some of the windiest conditions in the Pacific Northwest. Periodically, strong east winds emerge from the Columbia River Gorge that affect the city's temperature and general climate. As a result, several businesses and locations utilize the East Wind identifier in their names or services.

== Demographics ==
Historical population
Census	Pop.	Note	%±
1910	309		—
1920	191		−38.2%
1930	227		18.8%
1940	211		−7.0%
1950	514		143.6%
1960	522		1.6%
1970	1,661		218.2%
1980	5,831		251.1%
1990	7,852		34.7%
2000	13,777		75.5%
2010	15,962		15.9%
2020	16,300		2.1%

=== 2020 census ===
As of the 2020 census, Troutdale had a population of 16,300, 5,871 households, and 5,396 families residing in the city. The population density was 2,741.3 people per square mile.

The median age was 38.4 years. 22.6% of residents were under the age of 18 and 14.5% of residents were 65 years of age or older. For every 100 females there were 98.1 males, and for every 100 females age 18 and over there were 97.5 males age 18 and over.

99.5% of residents lived in urban areas, while 0.5% lived in rural areas.

There were 5,871 households in Troutdale, of which 34.1% had children under the age of 18 living in them. Of all households, 53.2% were married-couple households, 15.9% were households with a male householder and no spouse or partner present, and 22.5% were households with a female householder and no spouse or partner present. About 19.9% of all households were made up of individuals and 8.4% had someone living alone who was 65 years of age or older.

There were 6,031 housing units, of which 2.7% were vacant. Among occupied housing units, 67.7% were owner-occupied and 32.3% were renter-occupied. The homeowner vacancy rate was 0.6% and the rental vacancy rate was 3.9%.

The average family size was 3.59 people, compared to 2.99 people in Oregon. 33.5% were never married in Troutdale.

The ancestry of the city was 17.7% English, 16.8% German, 16.8% Irish, 2.4% Italian, 2.2% Scottish, 1.7% Norwegian, 1.0% French, 0.7% Sub Saharan African, and 0.6% Polish.

The median household income was $85,131 in Troutdale. Families had a median household of $94,270, Married couples had a median household income of $113,354, and non families had a median household income of $60,417. 7.9% of the population were under the poverty line.

Racial composition as of the 2020 census
Race	Number	Percent
White	11,890	72.9%
Black or African American	369	2.3%
American Indian and Alaska Native	170	1.0%
Asian	894	5.5%
Native Hawaiian and Other Pacific Islander	102	0.6%
Some other race	1,208	7.4%
Two or more races	1,667	10.2%
Hispanic or Latino (of any race)	2,392	14.7%

=== 2010 census ===
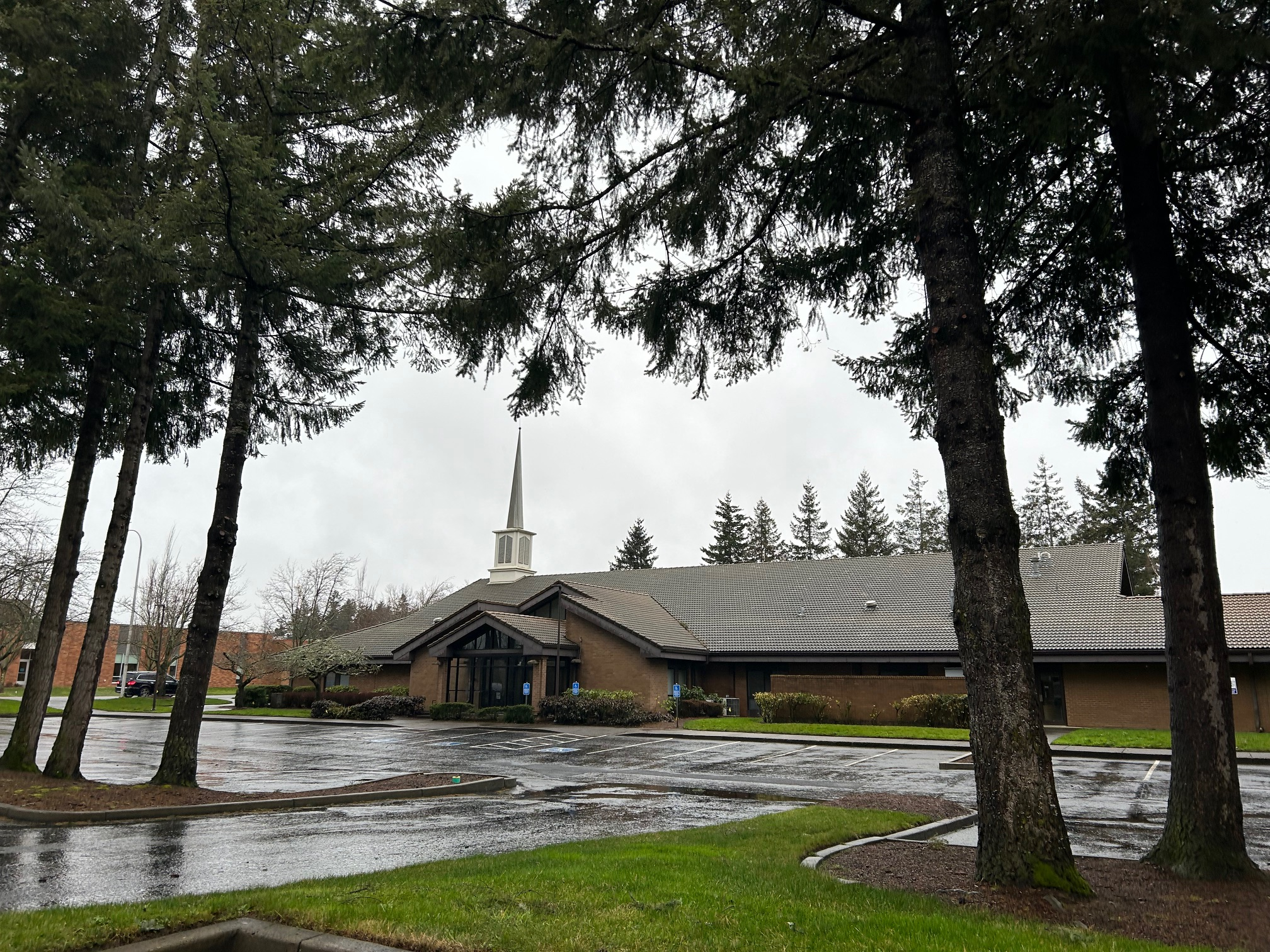
A Latter-day Saint chapel in Troutdale

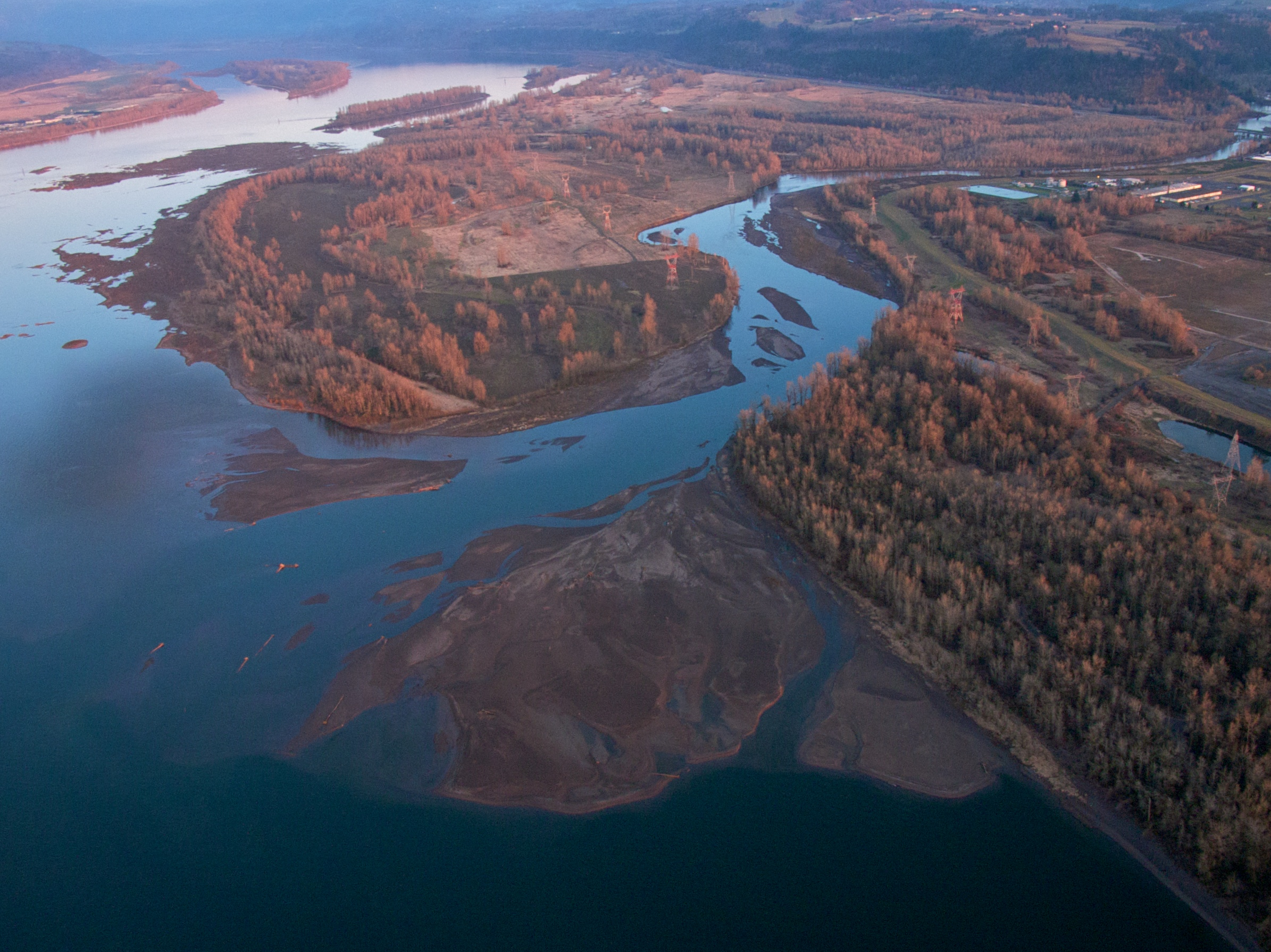
The confluence of the Sandy and Columbia Rivers in Troutdale

As of the census of 2010, there were 15,962 people, 5,671 households, and 4,208 families residing in the city. The population density was 2,687.2 inhabitants per square mile (1,037.5/km^{2}). There were 5,907 housing units at an average density of 994.4 per square mile (383.9/km^{2}). The racial makeup of the city was 83.6% White, 2.1% African American, 1.0% Native American, 4.6% Asian, 0.4% Pacific Islander, 4.2% from other races, and 4.0% from two or more races. Hispanic or Latino of any race were 10.6% of the population.

There were 5,671 households, of which 40.3% had children under the age of 18 living with them, 55.7% were married couples living together, 12.9% had a female householder with no husband present, 5.6% had a male householder with no wife present, and 25.8% were non-families. 18.8% of all households were made up of individuals, and 5.1% had someone living alone who was 65 years of age or older. The average household size was 2.81 and the average family size was 3.20.

The median age in the city was 34 years. 27.5% of residents were under the age of 18; 9.8% were between the ages of 18 and 24; 27.9% were from 25 to 44; 27.1% were from 45 to 64; and 7.6% were 65 years of age or older. The gender makeup of the city was 49.0% male and 51.0% female.

=== 2000 census ===
As of the census of 2000, there were 13,777 people, 4,671 households, and 3,690 families residing in the city. The population density was 2,761.1 people per square mile (1,066.1 people/km^{2}). There were 4,865 housing units at an average density of 975.0 per square mile (376.4/km^{2}). The racial makeup of the city was 87.54% White, 4.14% Asian, 1.90% African American, 0.92% Native American, 0.25% Pacific Islander, 1.71% from other races, and 3.53% from two or more races. Hispanic or Latino of any race were 4.62% of the population.

There were 4,671 households, out of which 44.3% had children under the age of 18 living with them, 64.6% were married couples living together, 10.8% had a female householder with no husband present, and 21.0% were non-families. 13.9% of all households were made up of individuals, and 1.9% had someone living alone who was 65 years of age or older. The average household size was 2.89 and the average family size was 3.19.

In the city, the age distribution of the population shows 30.1% under the age of 18, 9.0% from 18 to 24, 35.4% from 25 to 44, 21.1% from 45 to 64, and 4.4% who were 65 years of age or older. The median age was 32 years. For every 100 females, there were 100.4 males. For every 100 females aged 18 and over, there were 99.4 males.

The median income for a household in the city was $56,593, and the median income for a family was $62,203. Males had a median income of $41,808 versus $30,989 for females. The per capita income for the city was $21,778. About 3.3% of families and 4.8% of the population were below the poverty line, including 4.2% of those under age 18 and 6.0% of those aged 65 or over.

== Economy ==
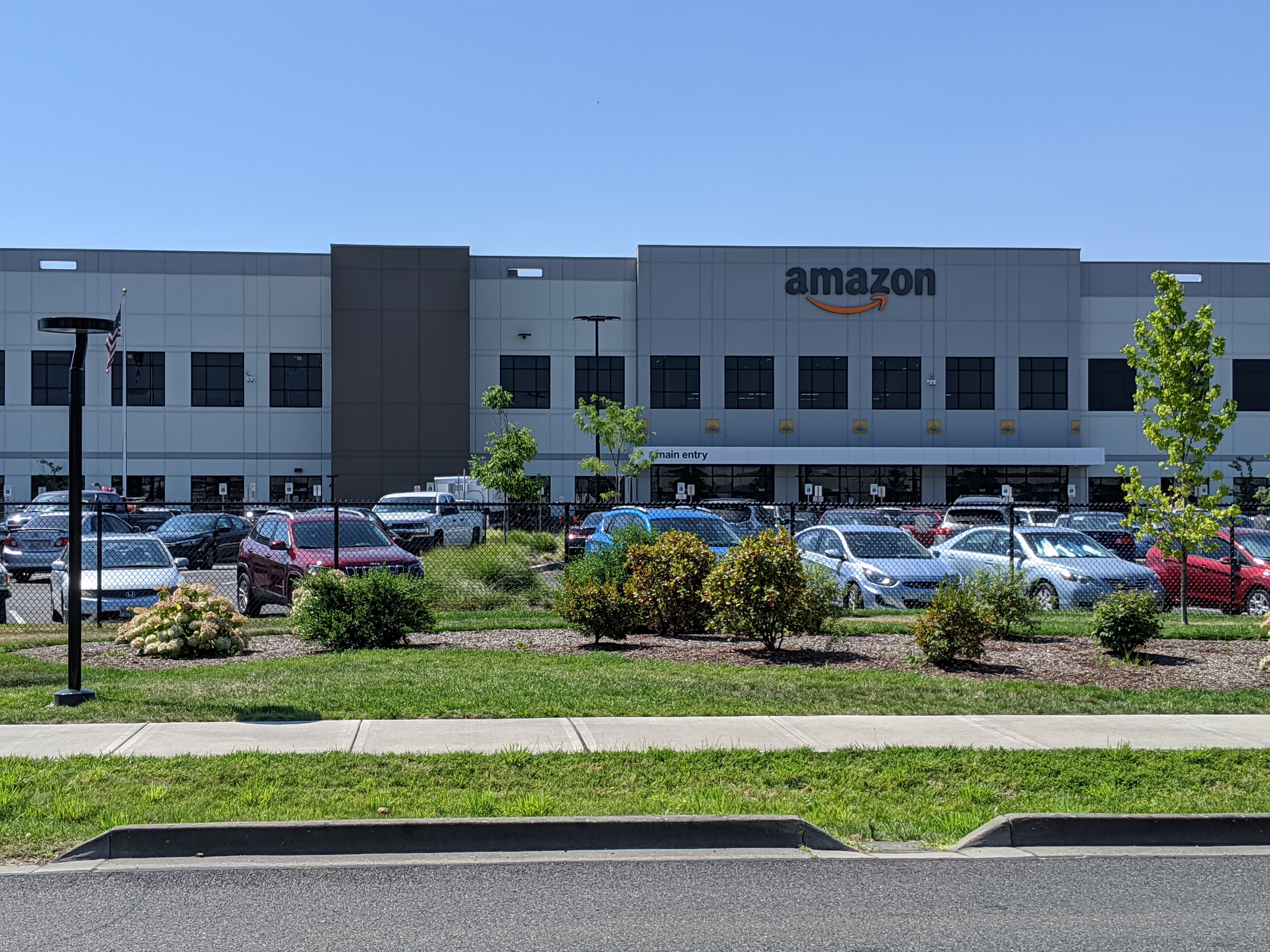
Amazon fulfillment center, Troutdale

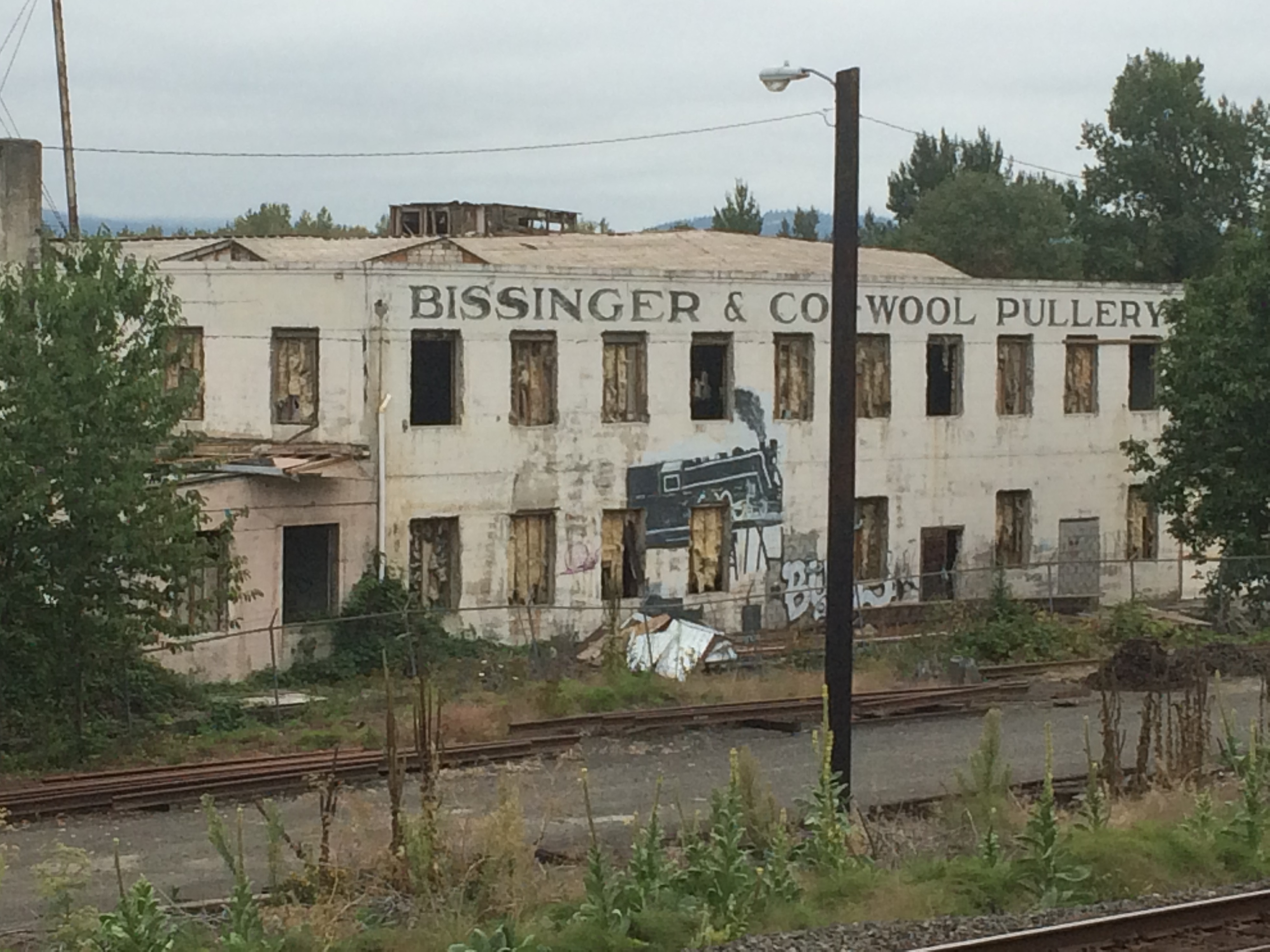
A 2019 photo of Bissinger Wool Pullery, Troutdale

The local economy has shifted since the start of the century as the Portland region continues to grow. While the majority of residents work in Portland or Gresham, recent industrial development related to at the Port of Portland's Troutdale Reynolds Industrial Park has helped turned the community into a jobs center for the region.

FedEx is currently the largest employer in the city, with a sizable distribution facility for its FedEx Ground operations. Other major employers include Amazon, Reynolds School District, Multnomah County Sheriff's Office, Albertsons/Safeway, The Home Depot, and McMenamins.

== Tourism ==
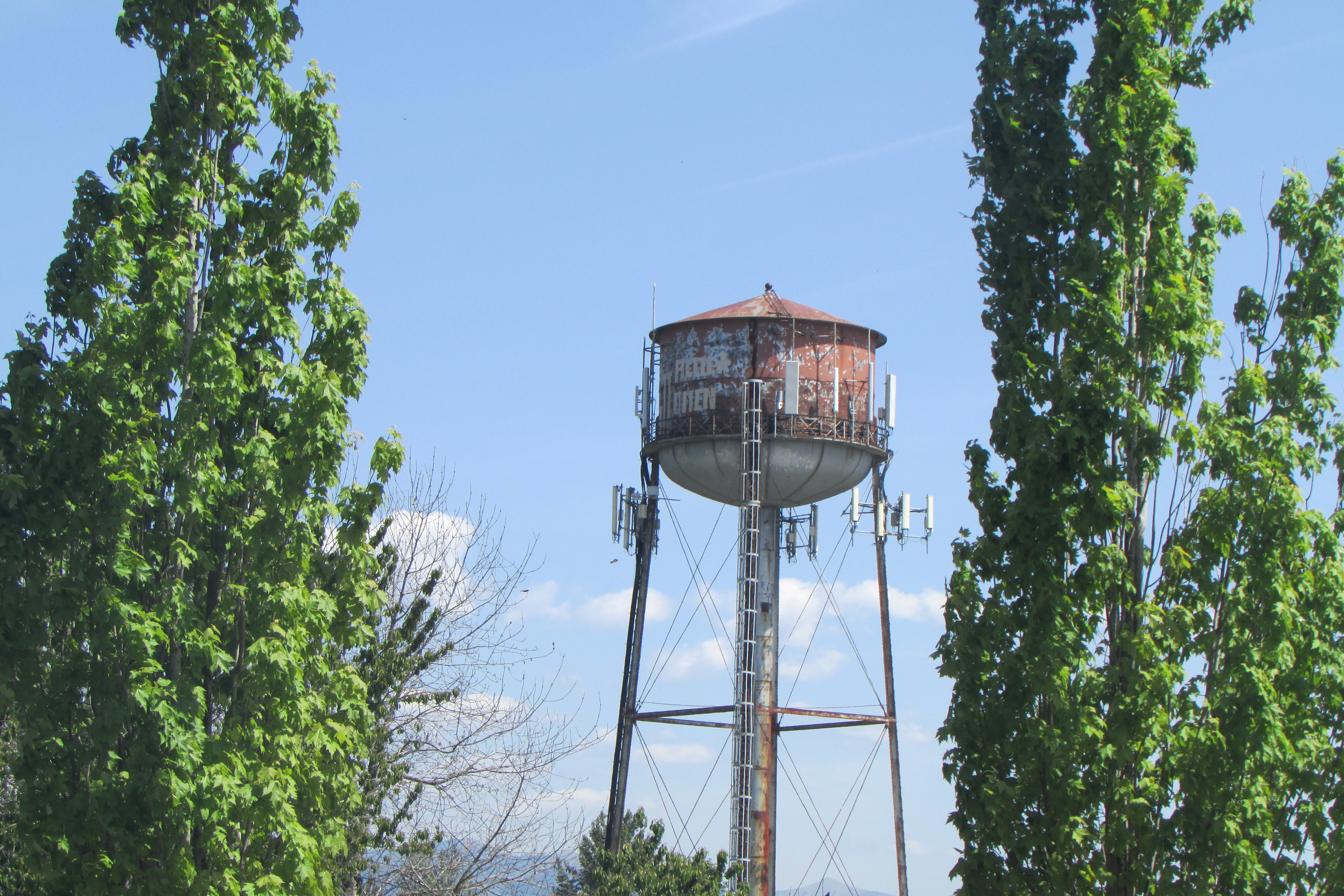
The old historic water tower, as seen from downtown

Troutdale is the home of one of the most notable locations of the local McMenamins brewpub and hotel chain, the 38-acre (150,000 m^{2}) Edgefield, which was formerly the Multnomah County Poor Farm. The site has a hotel and a variety of restaurants, bars, and entertainment venues. Edgefield is listed on the National Register of Historic Places (NRHP).

Other buildings on the NRHP in Troutdale include the Fred Harlow House and the Troutdale Methodist Episcopal Church.

== Education ==
Troutdale is served by the Reynolds School District. Reynolds High School, Walt Morey Middle School, and Sweetbriar and Troutdale elementary schools are located in the city. Open Door Christian Academy is a private school.

== Transportation ==
Electric interurban service connecting Troutdale with Gresham began in 1907, operated by the Portland Railway, Light and Power Company and connecting in Gresham with interurban service through to Portland. The line was abandoned in 1927.

From at least the 1940s through the 1960s, bus transit service connecting Troutdale with Gresham and Portland was provided by a private company named Portland Stages, Inc. This service was taken over by TriMet, a then-new public agency, in 1970, and TriMet continues to provide transit service in Troutdale today. Columbia Area Transit operates the Columbia Gorge Express to Portland and Hood River.

The city is home to Portland–Troutdale Airport, a general aviation airport.

== Parks and recreation ==
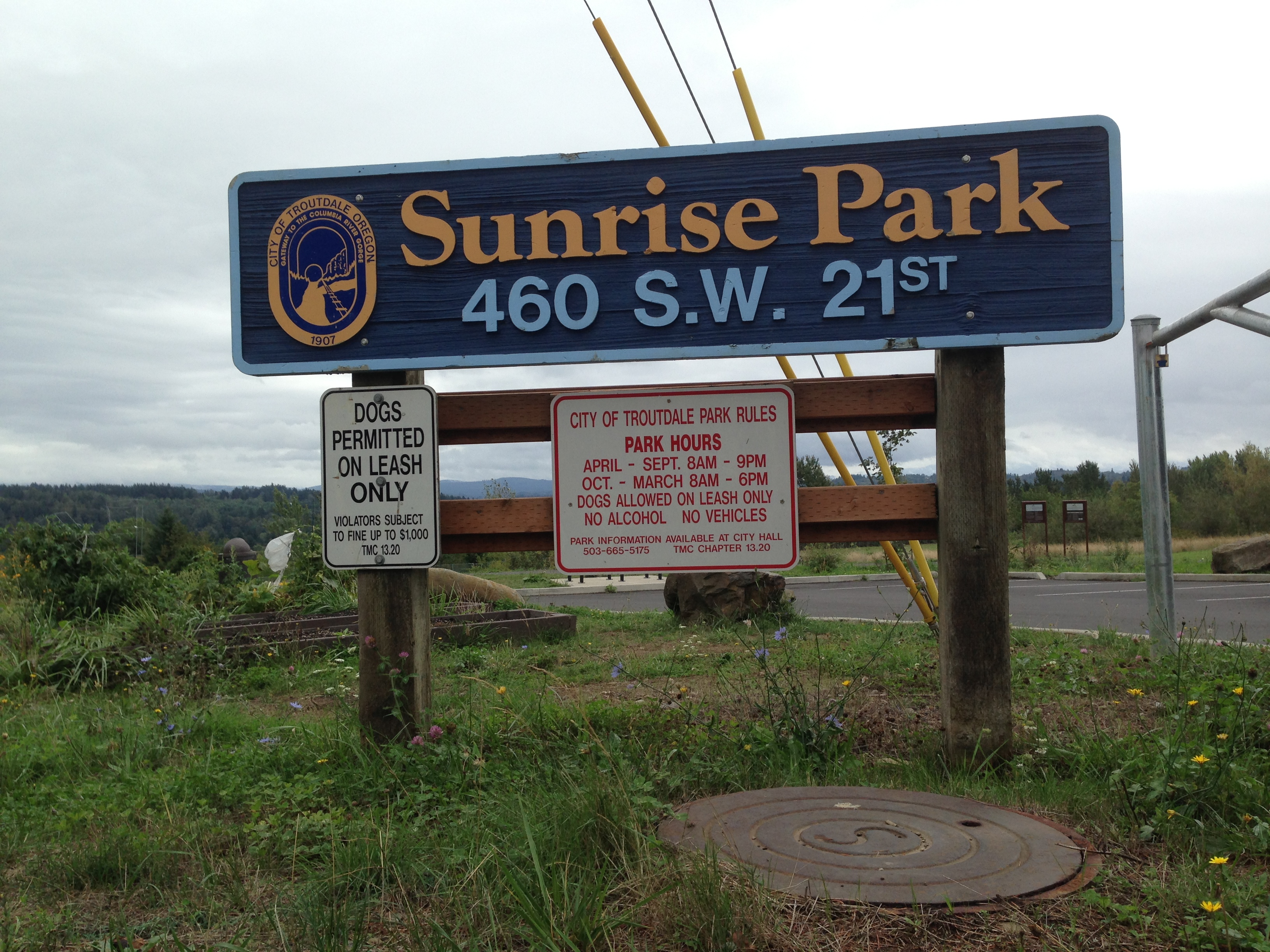
A sign for Sunrise Park in Troutdale

Troutdale's park system includes nearly 20 parks ranging from the heavily used Glenn Otto Park on the banks of the Sandy River to neighborhood parks throughout the city. The city's largest park is Columbia Park which is home to the Imagination Station playground and athletic fields. Sunrise Park consists of a half-mile-long looping trail with views of Mount Hood and rentable community garden beds. Others include College Nature Park, Helen Althaus Park, Kiku Park, Lewellyn Park, Mayors Square, Visionary Park, Weedin Park, and Woodale Park.

== Notable people ==
- Drew Eubanks, American basketball player
- Clara Latourell Larsson, Troutdale's first female and Native American mayor
- Gino Vannelli, musician

== See also ==
- Depot Rail Museum
- Troutdale Centennial Arch
