= List of killings by law enforcement officers in the United States, 2005 =

)

This is a list of people reported killed by non-military law enforcement officers in the United States in 2005, whether in the line of duty or not, and regardless of reason or method. The listing documents the occurrence of a death, making no implications regarding wrongdoing or justification on the part of the person killed or officer involved. Killings are arranged by date of the incident that caused death. Different death dates, if known, are noted in the description. The table below lists 156 people.

== 2005 ==
Date	Name (age) of deceased	Race	State (city)	Description
2005-12-31	Jermaine D. Bell (14)	Black	Virginia (Emporia)	
2005-12-30	Guillermo Martinez Rodriguez (20)	Unknown	California (San Diego-Tijuana)	
2005-12-29	Javier Escamilla (29)		California (Westminster)	
2005-12-29	Unnamed man		California (Las Vegas)	
2005-12-29	William E. Sheffield (45)	Black	South Carolina (Society Hill)	
2005-12-28	Nasir Abdi (23)		Ohio (Columbus)	
2005-12-26	Bailey Leonard Fritzmeier (23)		Massachusetts (Providence)	
2005-12-26	Unnamed man (38)		Louisiana (New Orleans)	
2005-12-25	Unnamed man (29)		Nebraska (Kearney)	
2005-12-24	Unnamed man		California (Los Angeles)	
2005-12-23	Ritchie Arthur Brown (22)	Black	Texas (Friendswood)	
2005-12-22	Tyree Wallace (22)	Black	Pennsylvania (Philadelphia)	
2005-12-21	Adam Vazquez (26)	Hispanic/Latino	Maryland (Randallstown)	
2005-12-21	Leslie Holliday (34)	Black	Maryland (Randallstown)	
2005-12-19	Samuel Paul Rodriguez (41)	Unknown	California (Yountville)	
2005-12-18	Bobby Pounds (21)	Black	Illinois (Midlothian)	
2005-12-17	Damon Arthur Hicks (27)	Black	Arizona (Peoria)	
2005-12-16	Rafael Cuevas Jr. (31)	Hispanic/Latino	California (Turlock)	
2005-12-15	Aurelio Chevez (24)	Hispanic/Latino	Texas (Houston)	
2005-12-14	Isaac Mouton (41)	Black	Louisiana (Lafayette)	
2005-12-14	Susan Jean Riegel (54)		Illinois (Wildwood)	
2005-12-13	Richard Tracy Davis (33)	White	Texas (Willis)	
2005-12-12	Dolores Jacks (71)		New Mexico (Clovis)	
2005‑12-11	Donald Suell		Northern Mariana Islands (Gualo Rai)	Suell, also known as Orin Tagabuel, was shot by an officer responding to a fight after he allegedly attacked the officer with a piece of wood.
2005-12-11	Angelo Ferguson (18)	Black	Ohio (Cleveland)	
2005-12-10	James Richard Nace (42)	Unknown	California (Geyserville)	
2005-12-07	Rigoberto Alpizar (44)	Hispanic/Latino	Florida (Miami)	
2005-12-07	Steven Hamlin (33)	Unknown	Pennsylvania (Pittsburgh)	
2005-12-06	Michael Londonio (29)	White	New York (Bronx)	
2005‑12-03	Harvey Ex (53)	White	Nevada (Stateline)	Ex was killed in a shootout with two sheriff's deputies outside Harrah's Lake Tahoe casino.
2005-12-03	Wayne D. Priestley (47)	Unknown	Louisiana (Baton Rouge)	
2005-11-30	William Johnson (62)	Black	Pennsylvania (Harrisburg)	
2005-11-25	Richard Townsend (50)	Unknown	Oregon (Corvallis)	
2005-11-22	Michael Scott Neal (31)	White	Texas (Mexia)	
2005-11-21	Ciara McDermott (30)	White	Connecticut (West Hartford)	
2005-11-15	Dewann Christopher McCollum (32)	Black	North Carolina (Cullowhee)	
2005-11-13	Robert M. Agnew (22)	Black	Wisconsin (Milwaukee)	
2005-11-12	Kalik Church (31)	Black	New Jersey (Trenton)	
2005-11-11	Ronald Blake (34)	Unknown	Illinois (Staunton)	
2005-11-08	Juan Alvarez Velasquez (23)	Hispanic/Latino	California (Anaheim)	
2005-11-08	Daniel Bryan Faust (23)	White	Pennsylvania (Lititz)	
2005-11-06	Manuel Timothy Meastas Jr. (23)	Unknown	Colorado (Durango)	
2005-11-05	Daniel Ashworth (37)	Black	California (Westminster)	
2005-11-04	Stephone Crawford (21)	Black	New York (Brooklyn)	
2005-11-02	Russell Campbell (35)	White	Illinois (Marion)	
2005-10-30	Clarence Jones (22)	Unknown	Louisiana (Gray)	
2005-10-30	Leonel Disla (19)	Hispanic/Latino	New York (Bronx)	
2005-10-29	James R. Castillo (38)	Hispanic/Latino	West Jordan, Utah	
2005-10-24	Kevin H. Wood (31)	White	Texas (Decatur)	
2005-10-22	Darryl Green (21)	Black	New York (Brooklyn)	
2005-10-21	Anthony Johnson (15)	Unknown	Texas (Houston)	
2005-10-20	Jacob T. Crumpler (27)	Unknown	Texas (Houston)	
2005-10-20	David Crenshaw (33)	Black	Ohio (Cleveland)	
2005-10-18	Adaryll Taliaferro Beckwith (30)	Black	Alabama (Tuscumbia)	
2005‑10‑16	Hodell, Robert (59)		New Jersey (Galloway Township)	Hodell was shot and killed by Galloway Township Police Corporal Sean Hackney after he armed himself with scissors and charged at the officer.
2005-10-14	Linord Griffin (25)	Black	California (Lancaster)	
2005-10-14	Mario Perez Garcia (34)		California (Atwater)	About 7:40 pm Merced County sheriff deputies responded to a report of an intoxicated man trying to shoot himself. When deputies arrived at the home they found Garcia holding a handgun and they negotiated with him for fifteen to twenty minutes. When Garcia demanded they shoot him and pointed his gun at the deputies, one of the deputies shot and killed him.
2005-10-03	Agustin Murguia Jr. (22)	Hispanic/Latino	California (Long Beach)	
2005-10-02	Mark William Reinhold (38)	White	Michigan (Climax)	
2005-10-01	James Anthony Decosta (72)	White	California (Petaluma)	
2005-09-30	Laray Renshaw (36)	Black	Ohio (Cleveland)	
2005-09-30	Jeffrey Dean Martindale (32)	White	Nevada (Boulder City)	
2005-09-24	Marcus Quinn Bertonetesei (36)	Black	California (Beverly Hills)	
2005-09-24	Mario Jenkins (29)	Unknown	Florida (Orlando)	
2005-09-23	Virginia Verdee (12)		New York (The Bronx)	Verdee died after being struck and killed by an SVU being driven by an off-duty officer Michael Carlo on Grand Concourse.
2005-09-17	Debbie D. Loggins (33)	Unknown	Mississippi (North Carrollton)	
2005-09-16	John Raymond Pestana (44)	White	Washington (Tukwila)	
2005-09-15	Israel A. Martinez (18)	Hispanic/Latino	California (Santa Ana)	
2005-09-10	Dermico Deon Wright (30)	Black	Oklahoma (Oklahoma City)	
2005-09-08	Fouad Kaady		Oregon (Sandy)	Kaady shot to death by police after being injured in a car wreck and refusing to comply with officers.
2005-09-08	Eric Smith (34)	Unknown	California (East Rancho Dominguez)	
2005-09-07	Steven L Fountain (24)	White	California (Campbell)	
2005-09-07	Darnell R. Clement (26)	Black	Arizona (Scottsdale)	
2005‑09‑04	James Brissette (17)	Black	Louisiana	Danziger Bridge shootings
2005‑09‑04	Ronald Madison (40)	Black	Louisiana	Danziger Bridge shootings
2005-09-02	Henry Glover		Louisiana	Death of Henry Glover
2005-09-01	Brandon McCloud (15)		Ohio (Cleveland)	
2005-08-28	Gary Johnston (41)		Missouri (St. Louis)	
2005-08-28	Nyles Arrington (42)		North Carolina (Raleigh)	
2005-08-25	Raylyn "Ray Ray" George (20)		Connecticut (Bridgeport)	
2005-08-25	Miguel Degante (27)		Illinois (Chicago)	
2005-08-24	Unnamed man		New Mexico (Elephant Butte State Park)	
2005-08-24	Douglas Blackstone (24)		Texas (Duncanville)	
2005-08-20	Justin Toland (25)		Montana (Billings)	
2005-08-11	Richard Kim		California (Dublin)	Police shot Lee as he was wielding a knife, and one of the shots pierced through a door and struck Kim, killing him.
2005-08-11	Kwang Tae Lee		California (Dublin)	Police shot Lee as he was wielding a knife, and one of the shots pierced through a door and struck Kim, killing him.
2005-08-07	James A. Stone		Michigan (Detroit)	James "Poppa" Stone, "died in [police] custody at the Second Precinct after pleading to go to the hospital for several days."
2005-08-05	Rodney Erwin		Colorado (Colorado Springs)	Shot after pointing gun at police who were attempting arrest for parole violation.
2005-08-01	Unnamed man		California (San Jose)	
2005-07-28	Shane Walton (28)		California (Bakersfield)	Walton, as suspect in a carjacking and armed robbery, was pursued in a high speed chase by Bakersfield Police officers. When they stopped his vehicle and he tried to run away, two officers fired multiple times, killing him.
2005-07-22	Robert Craig (36)		California (Torrance)	
2005-07-21	Darren E. Wallace (33)		Nevada	
2005-07-21	Charles B. Barber (37)		Florida (Lake Worth)	
2005-07-18	Jimmy Mack Jordan (30)		Oklahoma (Maud)	
2005-07-11	Jerry Stephens (29)		Indiana (Indianapolis)	
2005-07-11	Unnamed man		Ohio (Columbus)	
2005-07-10	Jose Raul Lemon		California (Los Angeles)	
2005-07-10	Unnamed girl (1)		California (Los Angeles)	
2005-07-07	Bounmy Ousa (59)		Utah (West Valley City)	Shot outside his home while undercover police were staking out a suspected drug house. Ousa was either holding a flashlight or was empty-handed. The officer responsible was later fired for using drugs (possibly steroids). West Valley City settled a lawsuit with Ousa's family for $450,000.
2005-07-06	Walter Washington, Jr. (38)		New York (Utica)	Shot and killed outside Washington's ex-girlfriend's home. Utica Police officer Samuel Geddes and New York State Trooper Thomas Haver alleged that Washington pointed a handgun at them. Washington was later found to be in possession of a BB gun.
2005-07-03	Anthony Scott (25)		Michigan (Detroit)	Killed by police at a gas station. Police claim he had a knife in his hand but according to witnesses "he did not pull it or otherwise threaten the cops." Scott's family sued the city of Detroit for a wrongful death. It was settled for $1.2 million.
2005-07-02	Richard Cole (30)		Alabama (Montgomery)	
2005-06-20	Perry Manley (52)	White	Washington (Seattle)	Shot after attempting to enter courthouse with WWII-era grenade. Police spent 20 minutes attempting to convince Manly to surrender. Was shot after making a "furtive movement with the grenade" which was later found to be defused.
2005-06-18	Daniel Mendoza (21)	Unknown	California (Fresno)	Daniel Mendoza, age 21, was shot and killed by Fresno Police officers. He was a passenger in a car police had pulled over after a brief chase. He had been sought in connection with a shooting into his girlfriend's apartment on June 8.
2005-06-13	Rennie "Robby" Moore (27)	Unknown	Ohio (Dayton)	
2005-05-21	Donald Schwartz (79)	Unknown	Ohio (Dayton)	
2005-05-10	Chase McGowan (14)		California (Garner Valley)	District Attorney's Investigator David McGowan killed his three children, his wife, and his mother with his service weapon at their home before taking his own life.
2005-05-10	Paige McGowan (10)		California (Garner Valley)	District Attorney's Investigator David McGowan killed his three children, his wife, and his mother with his service weapon at their home before taking his own life.
2005-05-10	Rayne McGowan (8)		California (Garner Valley)	District Attorney's Investigator David McGowan killed his three children, his wife, and his mother with his service weapon at their home before taking his own life.
2005-05-10	Karen McGowan (42)		California (Garner Valley)	District Attorney's Investigator David McGowan killed his three children, his wife, and his mother with his service weapon at their home before taking his own life.
2005-05-10	Angelia McGowan (75)		California (Garner Valley)	District Attorney's Investigator David McGowan killed his three children, his wife, and his mother with his service weapon at their home before taking his own life.
2005-05-07	Jashon Bryant (18)	Black	Connecticut (Hartford)	Hartford Police Department officer Robert Lawlor and an FBI agent were working for an anti-drug task force in Hartford's North End and were trying to apprehend two suspects, Jashon Bryant and 21-year-old Brandon Henry. According to Lawlor, Henry and Bryant were in their car and Henry sped towards the FBI agent. Lawlor then fired at the car, killing Bryant and wounding Henry. Lawlor was charged with manslaughter and assault, and was found not guilty in 2009.
2005-04-29	Dennie Kenneth Trujillo (35)	Hispanic/Latino	Washington (Seattle)	
2005-04-27	Lewis Barber (48)	Unknown	Virginia (Alexandria)	
2005-04-23	Brandon Leon Williams (19)	Unknown	Georgia (Atlanta)	Shot after shooting and killing police officer. Williams was the driver of a vehicle that was pulled over by an anti-narcotics unit. As the officer approached the vehicle, Williams shot him through the closed window.
2005-04-19	Harry Brown (76)	Unknown	Ohio (Columbus)	
2005-04-01	Larry F. Winkler (55)	White	Colorado (Thornton)	
2005-04-01	Steven Cage (46)	Unknown	Maryland (Baltimore)	
2005-03-31	Douglas Michael Good (36)	Unknown	California (Bakersfield)	Good was killed by Kern County Sheriffs deputy Sean Pratt when Good allegedly pointed a handgun toward the officer at a motel. A Sheriff's Department shooting review board found the shooting to be within policy.
2005-03-30	Christopher Archaleta (29)	Race unspecified	Louisiana (Westwego)	
2005-03-29	Bobby Sherrod (31)	Black	Wisconsin (Kenosha)	
2005‑03-07	Wilbert Prado		Milwaukee, Wisconsin	
2005-02-25	Bruce H. Cleveland (40)	White	Utah (Orem)	
2005-02-22	Niema Latrese Thompson-Blake (30)	Black	Ohio (Dayton)	
2005-02-19	Arlin McClendon Jr. (36)	Unknown	Illinois (Calumet City)	After Medina exited a vehicle,(that was just chased) he was shot.
2005-02-12	Allante Lamont Powell Lightfoot (16)	Black	Michigan (Detroit)	Killed by police in the basement of his home. Police claim he was armed and came out firing however according to reports "no gunshot residue tests were performed on his hands, according to records later obtained from DPD."
2005-02-12	Mohammed Shuaibi (17)	Middle Eastern	Illinois (Orland Park)	Killed when off-duty officer Jason Casper crashed into their car while DUI.
2005-02-12	Ahmad Shaban (16)	Middle Eastern	Illinois (Orland Park)	Killed when off-duty officer Jason Casper crashed into their car while DUI.
2005-02-11	Herman Medina (15)	Hispanic/Latino	Illinois (Chicago)	After Medina exited a vehicle,(that was just chased) he was shot.
2005-02-10	Ronald Alan Hasse (54)	White	Illinois (Chicago)	Hasse died after an officer shocked him with a Taser for 57 seconds.
2005-02-06	Wilson "Alex" Lopez-Ochoa (21)	Hispanic/Latino	Illinois (Waukegan)	Lopez-Ochoa was killed when his car was struck by a squad car driven by officer Michael Newman on Super Bowl Sunday.
2005-02-02	Wilbert Burks (39)		Michigan (Detroit)	Killed by police in his home. According to eyewitnesses "It was overkill,” a neighbor told reporter Dianne Bukowski. “They had over 28 shots and he never shot off a round. The house was riddled with bullets. His girlfriend had two children in the house at the time. Her teenage daughter passed out, and they had to call EMS for her. Afterwards, the police were laughing in the street, like it was a party."
2005-01-29	Charles Polk (30)	Black	Pennsylvania (Philadelphia)	
2005-01-29	Vicente Desena (27)	Hispanic/Latino	Texas (Pasadena)	
2005-01-28	Terry Lee Grinner Jr. (30)	Unknown	California (Rohnert Park)	
2005-01-27	Kevin Todd Screws (34)	Unknown	Georgia (Perry)	After a shot car chase, Screws pointed his finger at police and was shot and killed. He was unarmed.
2005-01-24	Rasheed Fuquan Moore (26)	Black	New Jersey (Newark)	
2005-01-24	Boris Grbic (50)	White	Florida (Port St. Lucie)	
2005-01-24	Cameron Terrel Williams (34)	Black	California (Los Angeles)	
2005-01-24	Kazi Shinda Bell (22)	Black	California (Los Angeles)	
2005-01-23	Maynard King (74)	Black	California (Bellflower)	
2005-01-22	Terrance G. Sidener (56)	Unknown	Montana (Marion)	
2005-01-22	Benjamin Gene Decoteau (21)	Native American/Alaskan	Minnesota (Minneapolis)	
2005-01-21	Cheryl Nole (44)		Maryland (Baltimore)	
2005-01-21	Hwan Yu (39)	Asian/Pacific Islander	Illinois (Chicago)	
2005-01-21	Han Lee (43)	Asian/Pacific Islander	Illinois (Chicago)	
2005-01-18	Arcelia Balbontin (29)	Hispanic/Latino	Illinois (Chicago)	Balbontin was stabbed by her husband, off-duty officer Rafael Balbontin. At the time of Balbontin's murder, Rafael Balbontin was also being sued for the October 2002 fatal shooting of unarmed Juan Salazar.
2005-01-18	Manuel Zaragoza Lopez (24)	Unknown	California (Ontario)	
2005-01-17	Alfred Daniel Behney Jr. (42)	Black	South Carolina (Blacksburg)	
2005-01-05	Donald Neifert (40)	Black	Kentucky (Louisville)	
2005-01-04	Jeffrey Allan Gaddis (28)	White	Nevada (Las Vegas)	
2005-01-04	Felix Mojica (44)	White	Indiana (East Chicago)	
2005-01-02	Evaristo Barajas (36)	Hispanic/Latino	California (Redwood City)	
2005-01-02	Antoine Scott Peterson (33)	Black	North Carolina (West Asheville)	
2005-01-01	Dino Gomez (40)	Hispanic/Latino	Texas (Fort Worth)	
2005-01	unnamed man		Michigan (Detroit)	An unarmed and unnamed motorist, who according to reports is still unnamed to this day, was "shot to cops as he waited with his stalled vehicle."

== See also ==
- Death in custody § United States
- Henry A. Wallace Police Crime Public Database
- List of cases of police brutality
- List of countries with annual rates and counts for killings by law enforcement officers
- List of law enforcement officers killed in the line of duty in the United States
- List of law enforcement officers convicted for an on-duty killing in the United States
- List of shootings by US immigration agents
- List of police reforms related to the George Floyd protests
- List of unarmed African Americans killed by law enforcement officers in the United States
- Lists of killings by law enforcement officers
- Police brutality in the United States
- Police misconduct § United States
- Police riot § United States
- Police use of deadly force in the United States
