= Louise Home Hospital and Residence Hall =

- U.S. National Register of Historic Places
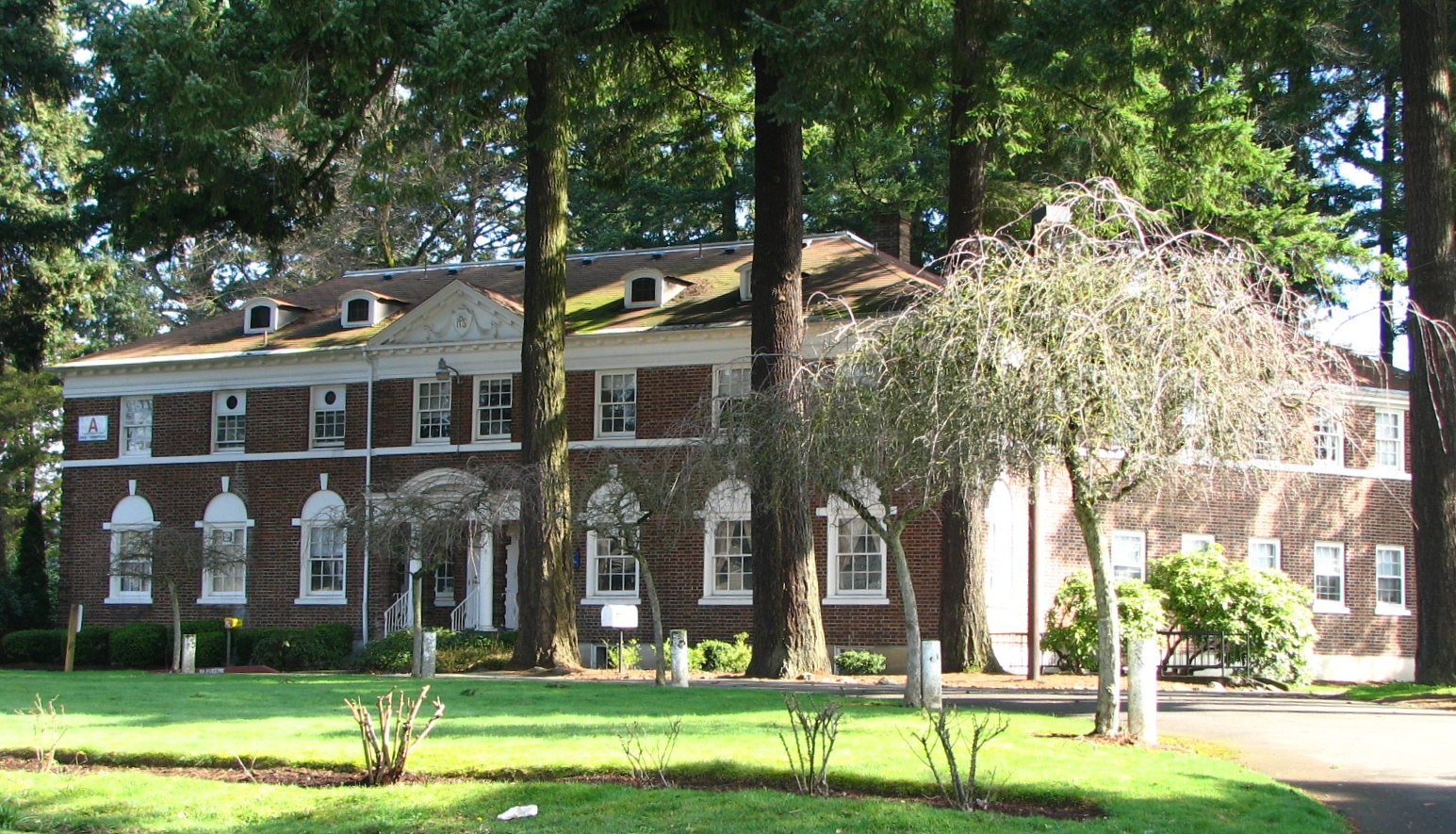

- Location within Oregon Location within the United States
- Location: 722 Northeast 162nd Avenue; Gresham, Oregon, U.S.
- Coordinates: 45°31′41″N 122°24′24″W
- Area: 17 acres (6.9 ha)
- Built: 1925
- Architect: Carl H. Walworth
- Architectural style: Georgian Revival
- NRHP reference No.: 87001556
- Added to NRHP: September 10, 1987

The Louise Home Hospital and Residence Hall is an historic hospital and residence hall in Gresham, Oregon, United States. Built in 1925, it originally served as a place of residence for unwed and pregnant mothers. It also housed the disabled, and served as a women's educational institution. The hospital and its surrounding 17-acre (6.9 ha) campus—surrounded by Douglas fir trees—is listed on the National Register of Historic Places.

Contemporarily, it is the headquarters of the Albertina Kerr Centers for Children, a mental health institution in the Portland metropolitan area.

== History ==
The original Louise Home was established in the Goose Hollow neighborhood of Portland, Oregon by William G. McLaren, who wanted to create awareness for unwed mothers. The home is believed to have taken its name from the house's first donor, or that of the sellers of the original home. The home was run by the Albertina Kerr Nursery.

The Louise Home Hospital and Residence Hall was built in 1925 on a 17-acre (6.9 ha) plot of land in Gresham due to an increased need for boarding and medical care for unwed pregnant women, single mothers, and children. The Louise Home was the center of the campus, housing unwed young women, though additional buildings served as the Albertina Kerr Nursery and the Wynne Watts School, an educational institute for women. The Louise Home had its own self-sustaining farm that provided meat, dairy products, eggs, fruit, and vegetables for the residents.

== See also ==
- Albertina Kerr
- National Register of Historic Places listings in Multnomah County, Oregon
