= Pat Pfeifer Park =

Public park in Gresham, Oregon, U.S.

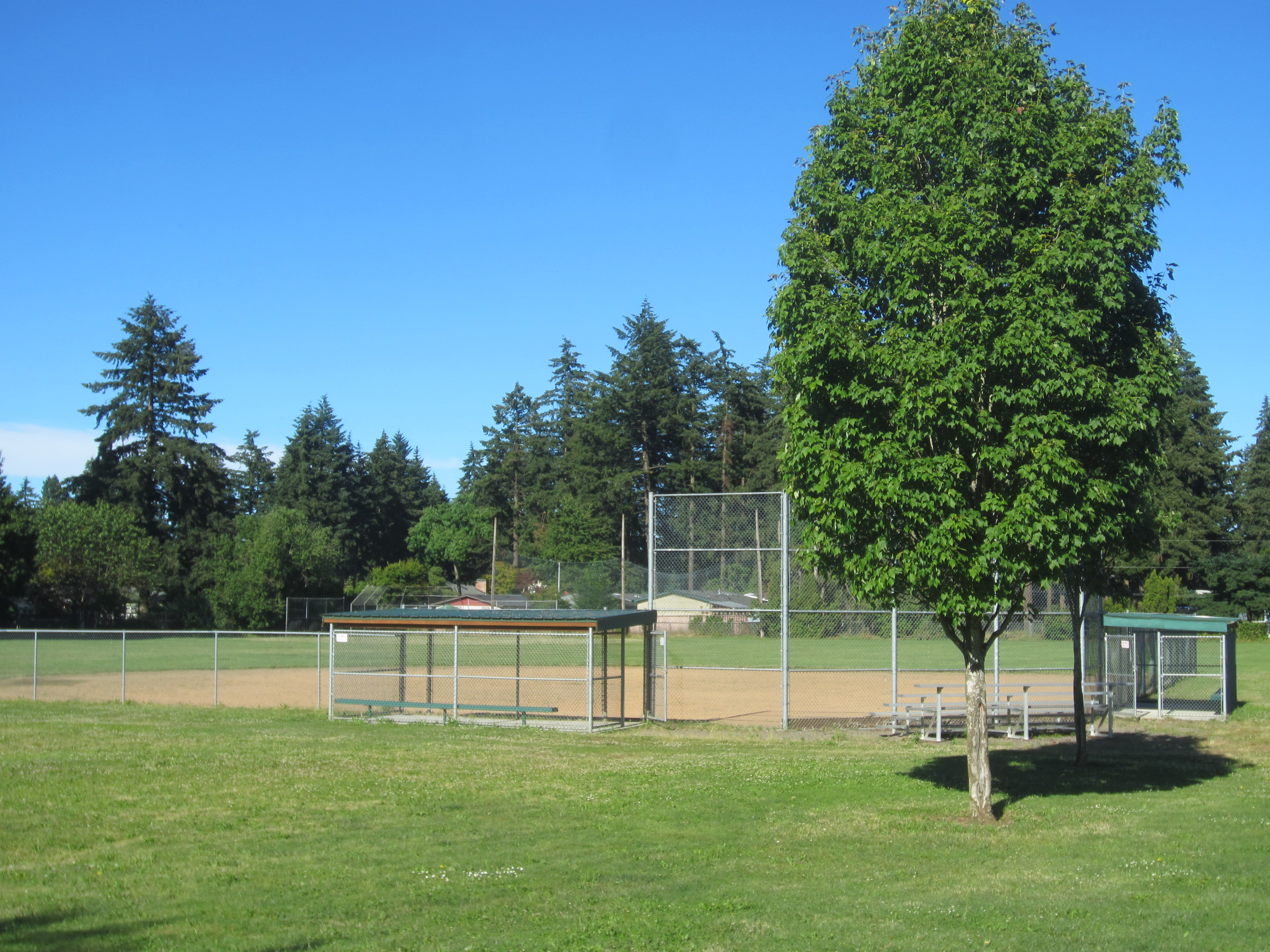
- Part of the park in 2022
- Interactive map of Pat Pfeifer Park
- Location: Gresham, Oregon, U.S.
- Coordinates: 45°31′27″N 122°29′04″W

Pat Pfeifer Park is a 13.3-acre (5.4 ha) public park in Gresham, Oregon, United States.
