= Albertina Kerr =

American philanthropist

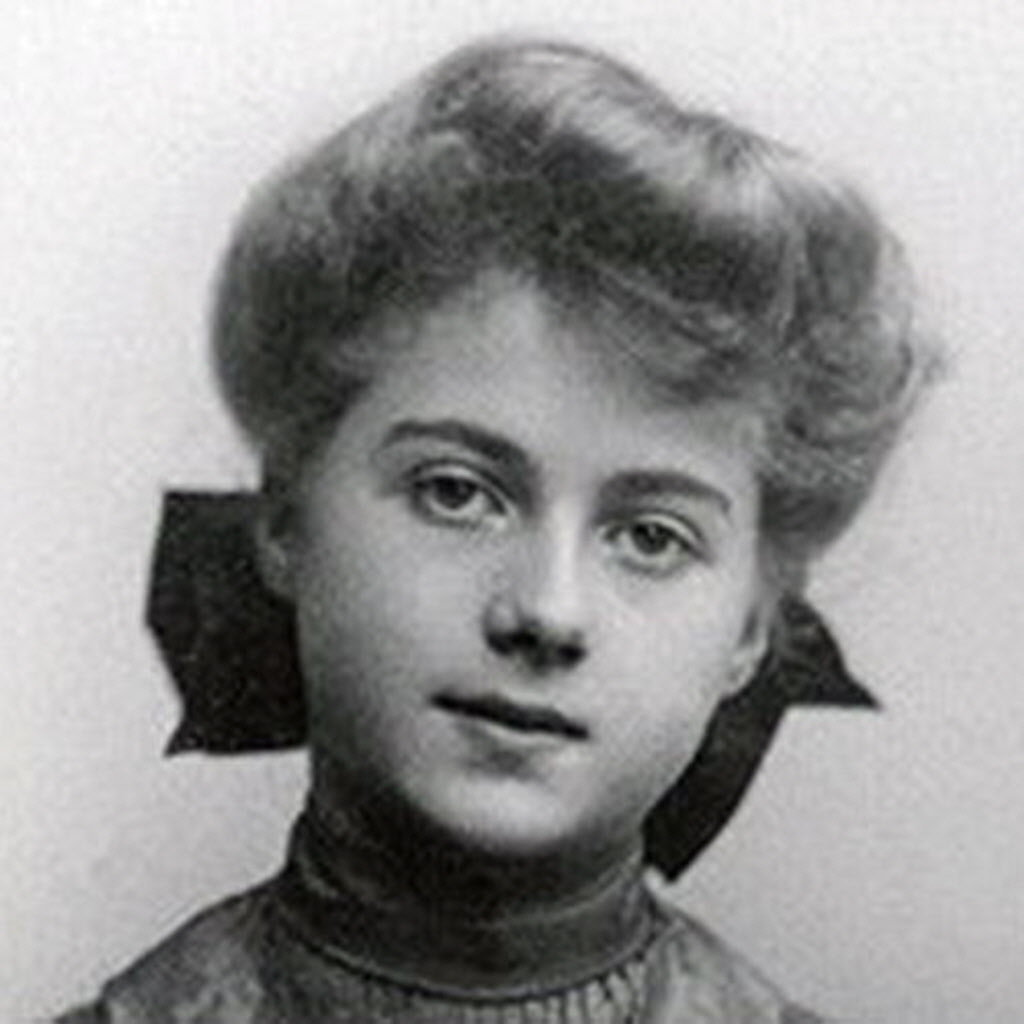
- Born: Albertina Sechtem; July 13, 1890; Portland, Oregon, U.S.
- Died: October 17, 1911 (aged 21); Portland, Oregon, U.S.
- Resting place: River View Cemetery

Albertina Kerr (née Sechtem; July 13, 1890 – October 17, 1911) was an American philanthropist and the wife of Kerr Glass Company founder Alexander H. Kerr. She is the namesake for the Albertina Kerr Centers in Portland, Oregon, United States, which historically provided care for orphaned children, as well as daycare services for single mothers.

== Biography ==
Albertina Sechtem was born in Portland to Louis and Christina Sechtem. Louis, who owned The Quelle Restaurant on Southwest Second Avenue and Stark Street, was from Germany, and Christina was from Sweden. Known to her family as "Tina", Albertina attended Couch Elementary School and Lincoln High School. Louis Sechtem died in 1894, so Albertina and her siblings went to work to support the family while in high school or shortly after. She dropped out of high school and went to work at the Kerr Glass Company at Northwest Fourth Avenue and Hoyt Street, where she met owner Alexander Kerr.

In what was a scandal at the time, Kerr divorced his wife to marry Sechtem, who was 28 years his junior; an Oregonian front-page headline of the time declared: "Rich merchant divorces wife!" Sechtem and Kerr were wed on September 29, 1910. Albertina moved into Alexander's house at 129 14th Street, and their son John was born in June 1911. Shortly after John was born, the Kerrs traveled to Camp Rilea on the Oregon Coast and Long Beach, Washington, and Albertina contracted typhoid fever while on the trip, probably from one of the beach areas. She died on October 17, 1911. Her deathbed wish to her husband was: "Look after other motherless babies, too."

== Legacy ==
Alexander donated their home to the Pacific Coast Rescue Society for use as a home for orphans. The home, which provided adoption services and daycare for the children of single mothers, opened in 1913 and quickly became too small; Alexander and his third wife, Ruth, raised money for a larger building at Northeast 22nd Avenue and Sandy Boulevard that opened in 1921 as the Albertina Kerr Nursery. The nursery operated until 1967, when the organization changed to a foster care approach. The original building on Sandy Boulevard was reopened in 1981 as Albertina's Restaurant and Shops. One of the restaurant's signature dishes is a cheesecake served in a 4-ounce Kerr canning jar. Today the Albertina Kerr Centers help people with developmental disabilities–a role the organization took on in the 1980s after the State of Oregon began to make plans to close the Fairview Training Center–and people with behavioral health needs.

Kerr is buried in River View Cemetery.

== See also ==
- Louise Home Hospital and Residence Hall
