= Red Sunset Park =

Public park in Gresham, Oregon, U.S.

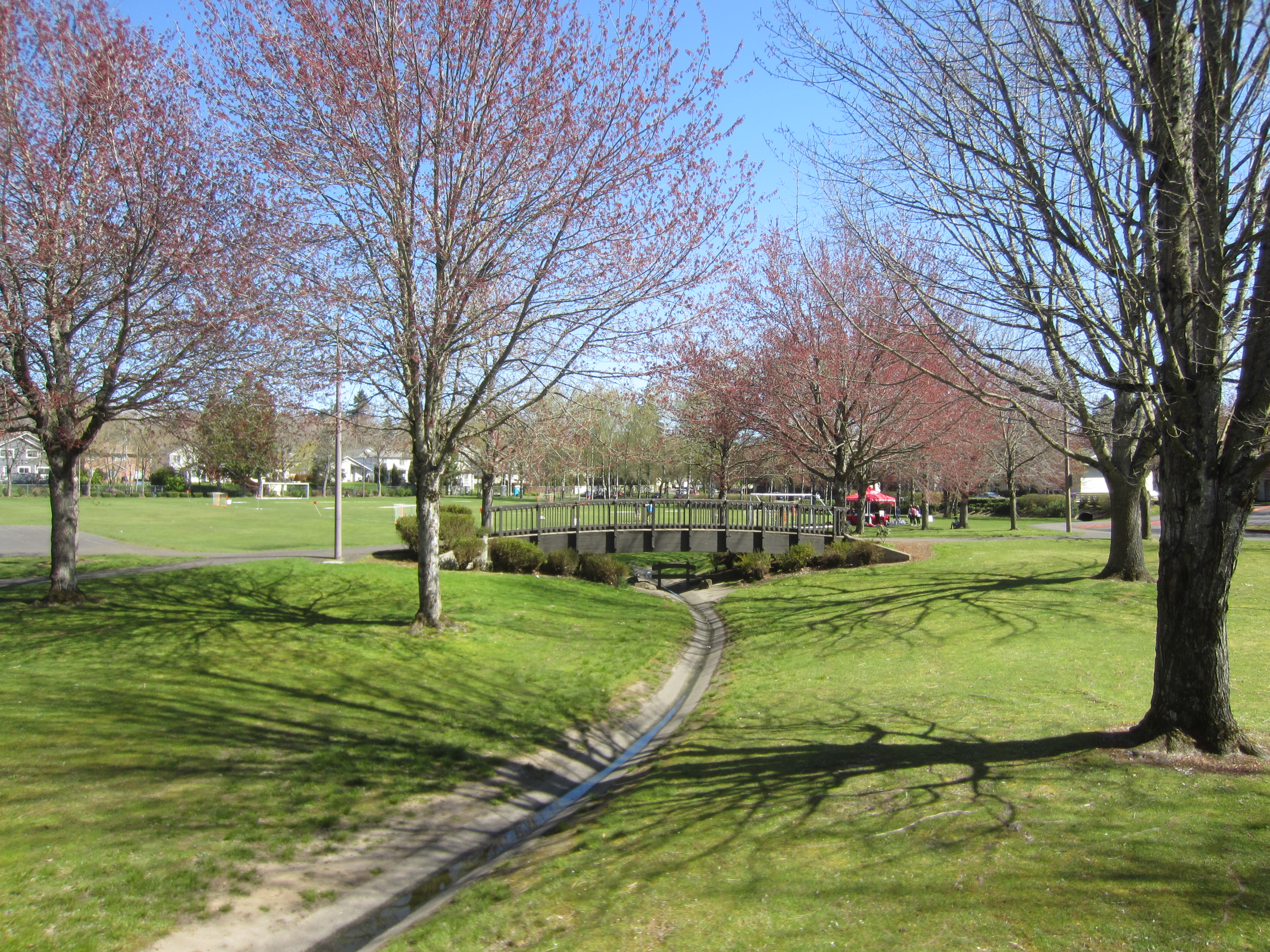
- Part of the park in 2021
- Interactive map of Red Sunset Park
- Location: Gresham, Oregon, United States
- Coordinates: 45°30′52″N 122°24′57″W

Red Sunset Park is a public park in Gresham, Oregon, United States.

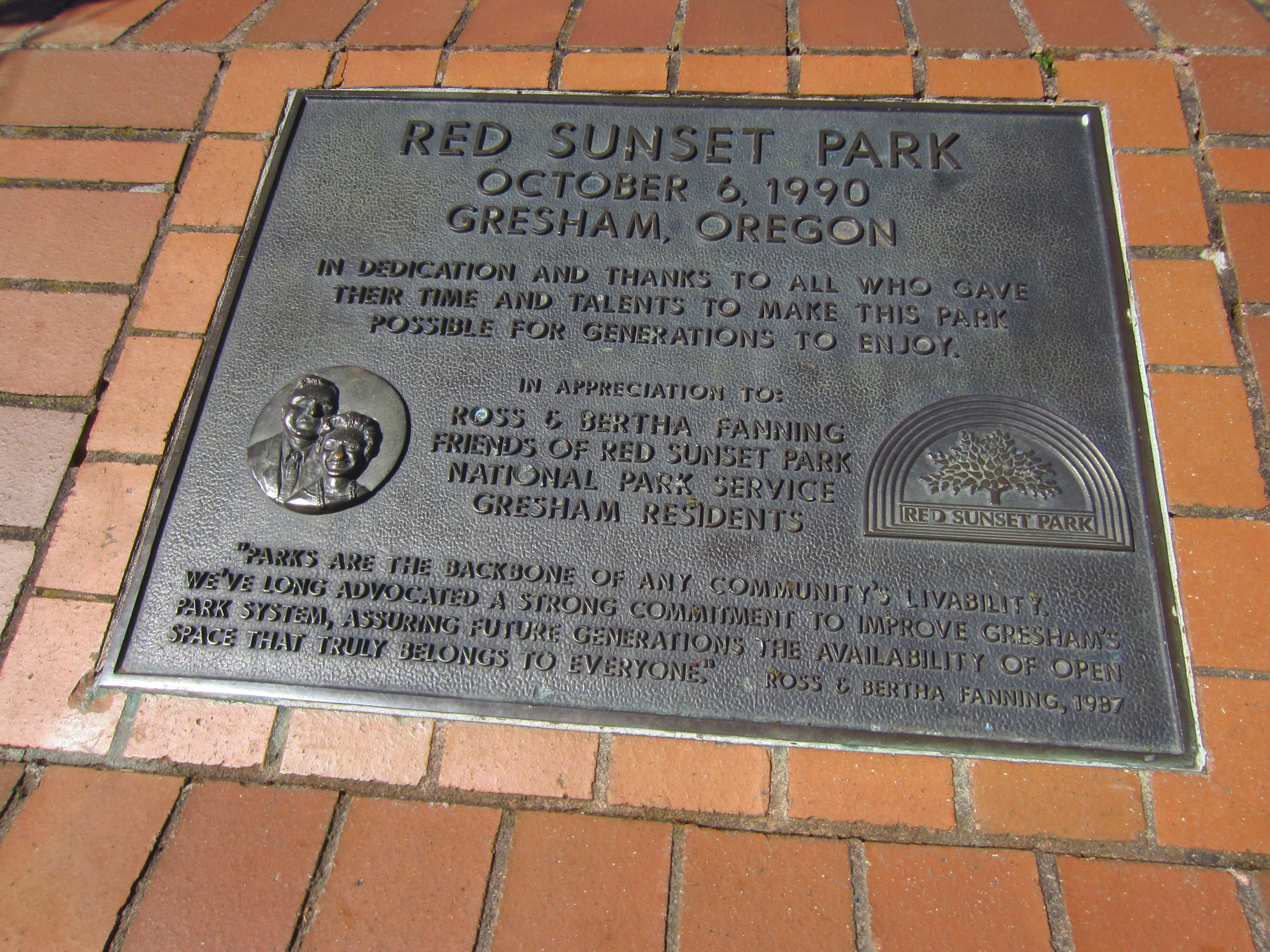

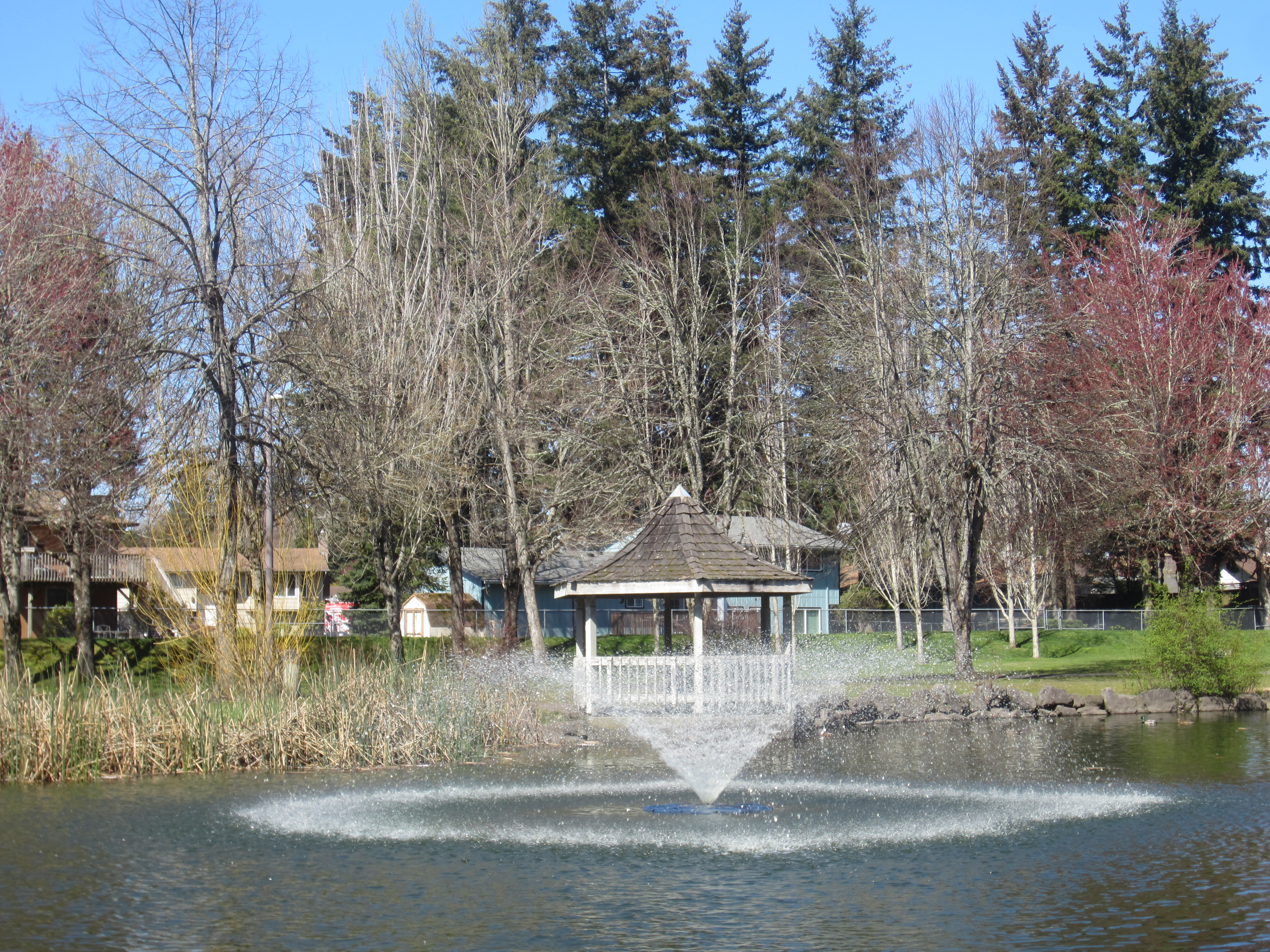

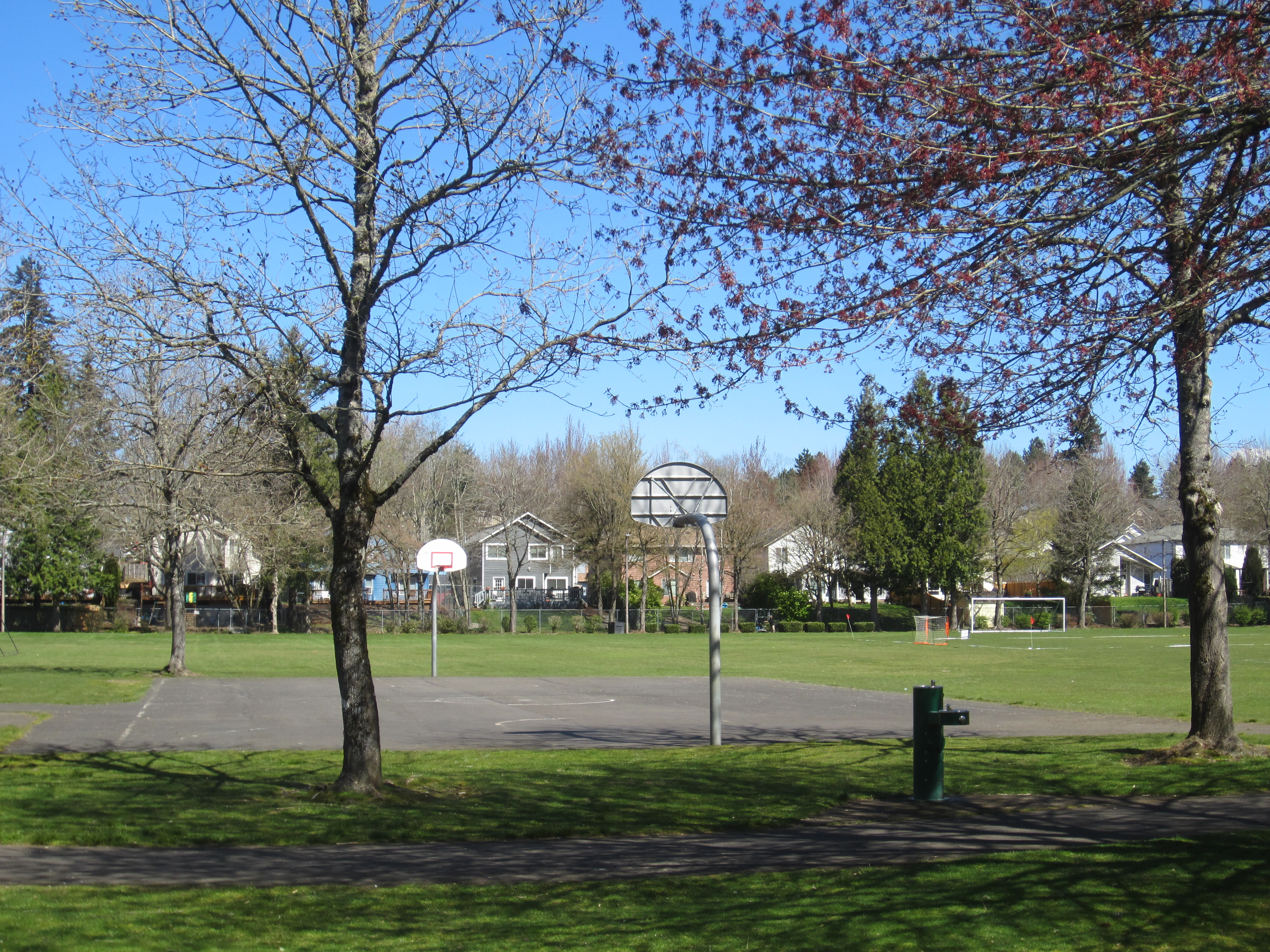
