= Main City Park =

Public park in Gresham, Oregon, U.S.

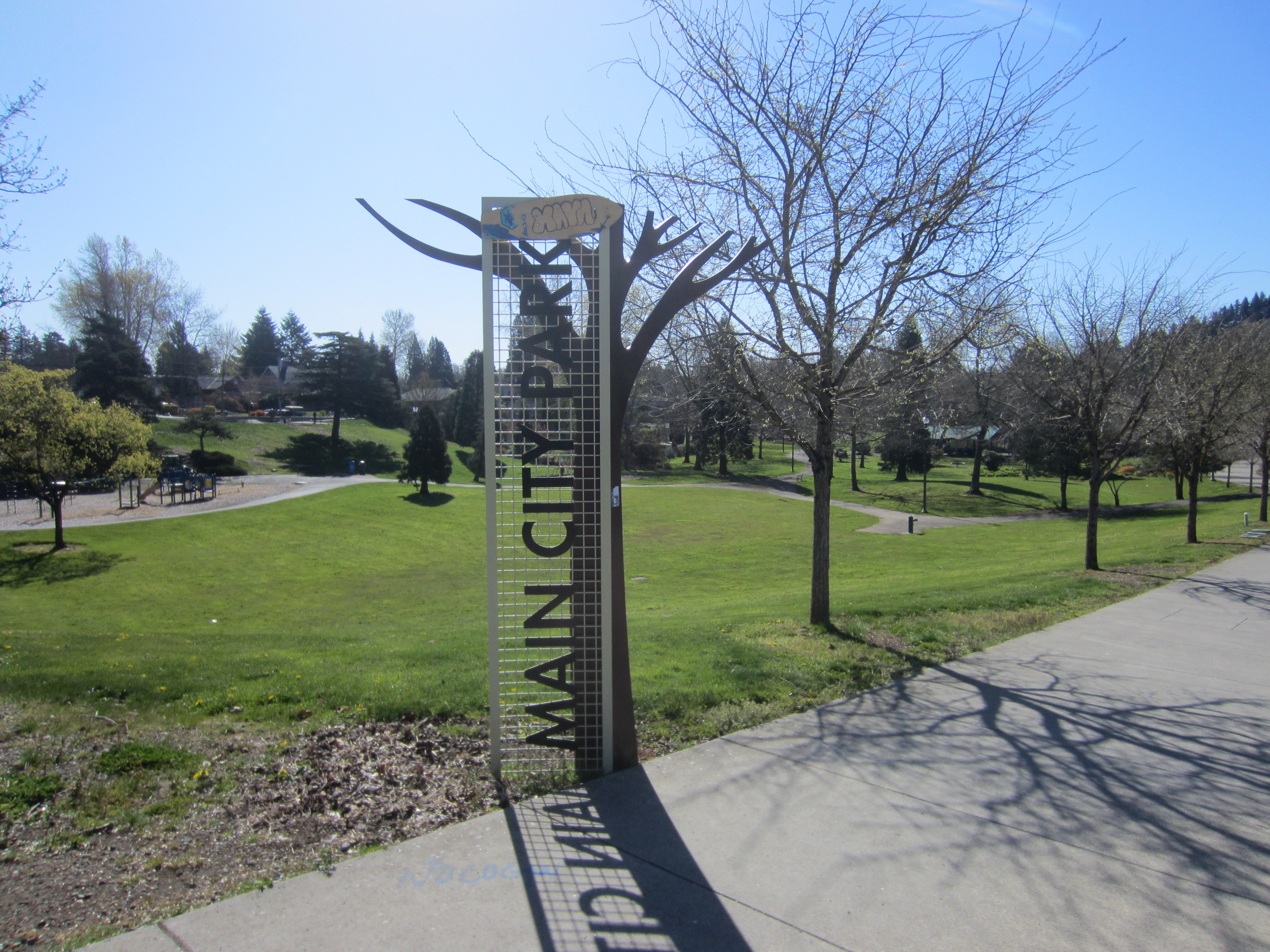
- Interactive map of Main City Park
- Location: Gresham, Oregon, U.S.
- Coordinates: 45°29′49″N 122°25′51″W

Main City Park is a 21-acre (8.5 ha) public park in Gresham, Oregon. It was purchased by the city in 1969 and developed in the 1970s.

The park is located near downtown Gresham and features a playground, trails, an off-leash dog park, a baseball field, a skatepark, a picnic shelter, a Japanese garden, and access to the Springwater Trail.

== Features ==
By 2014, the park had an off-leash dog area and surveillance cameras. Main City Park also has a baseball field and horseshoe courts.

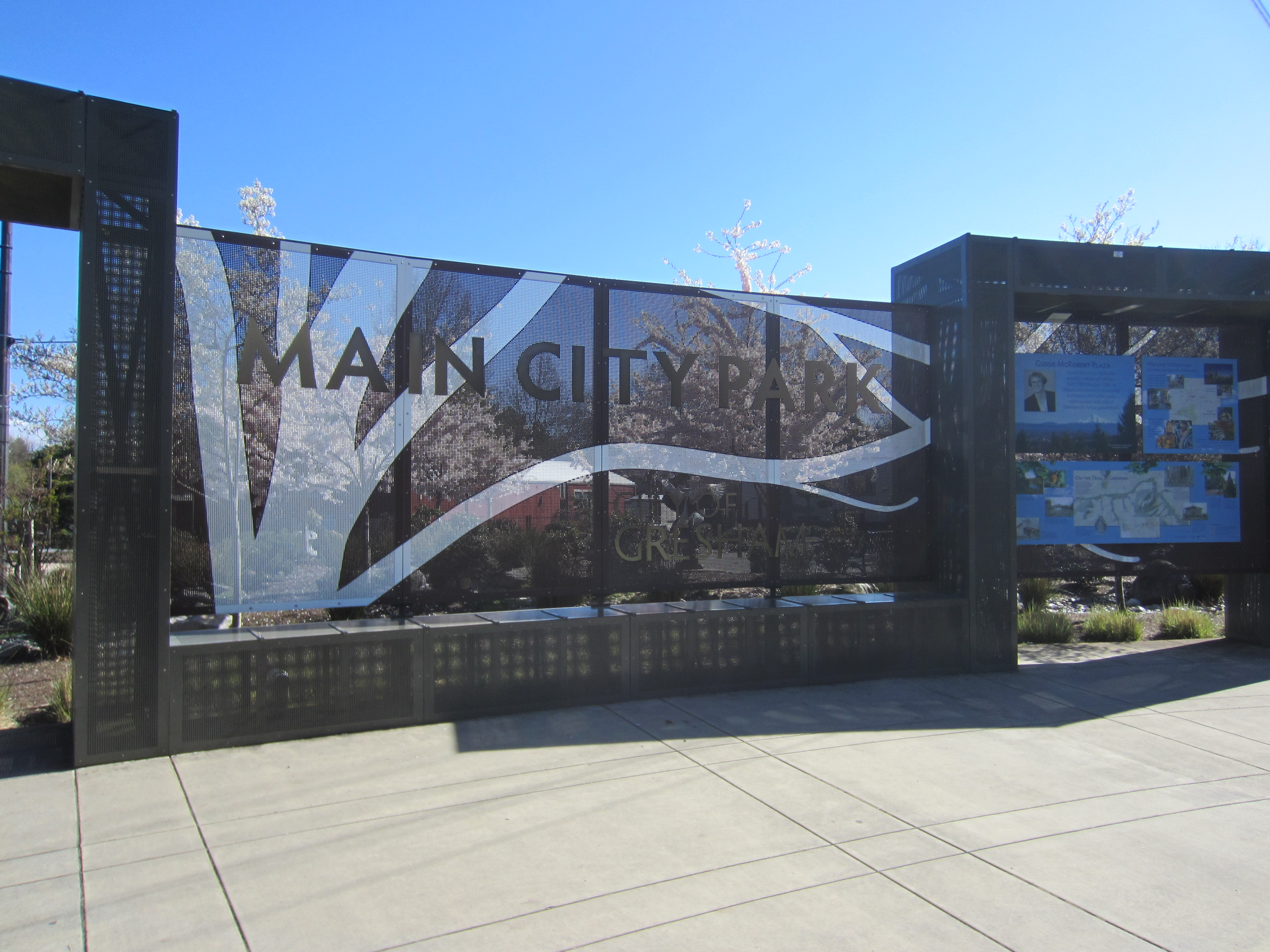
Entrance from the Springwater Corridor

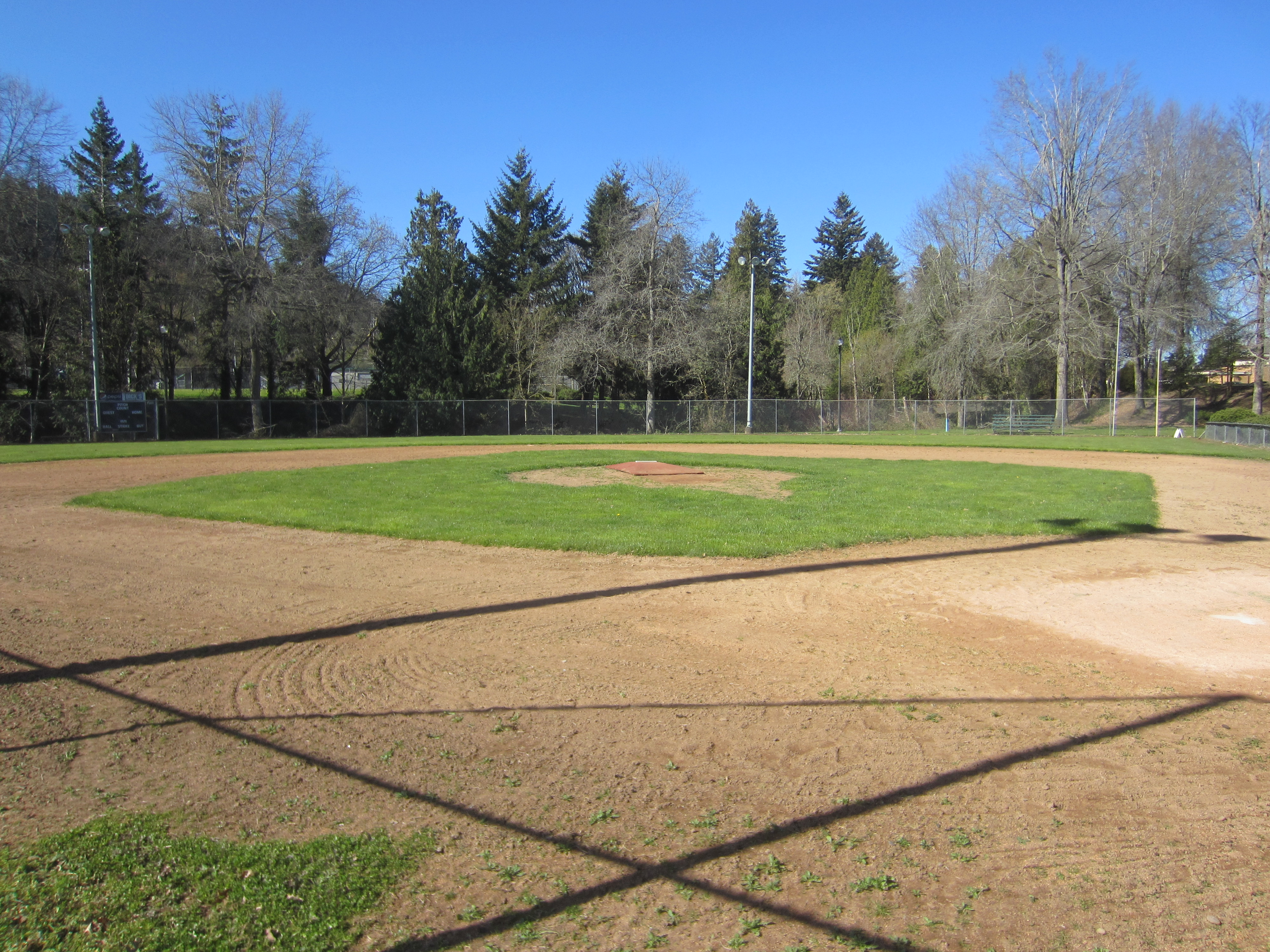
Baseball field, 2021

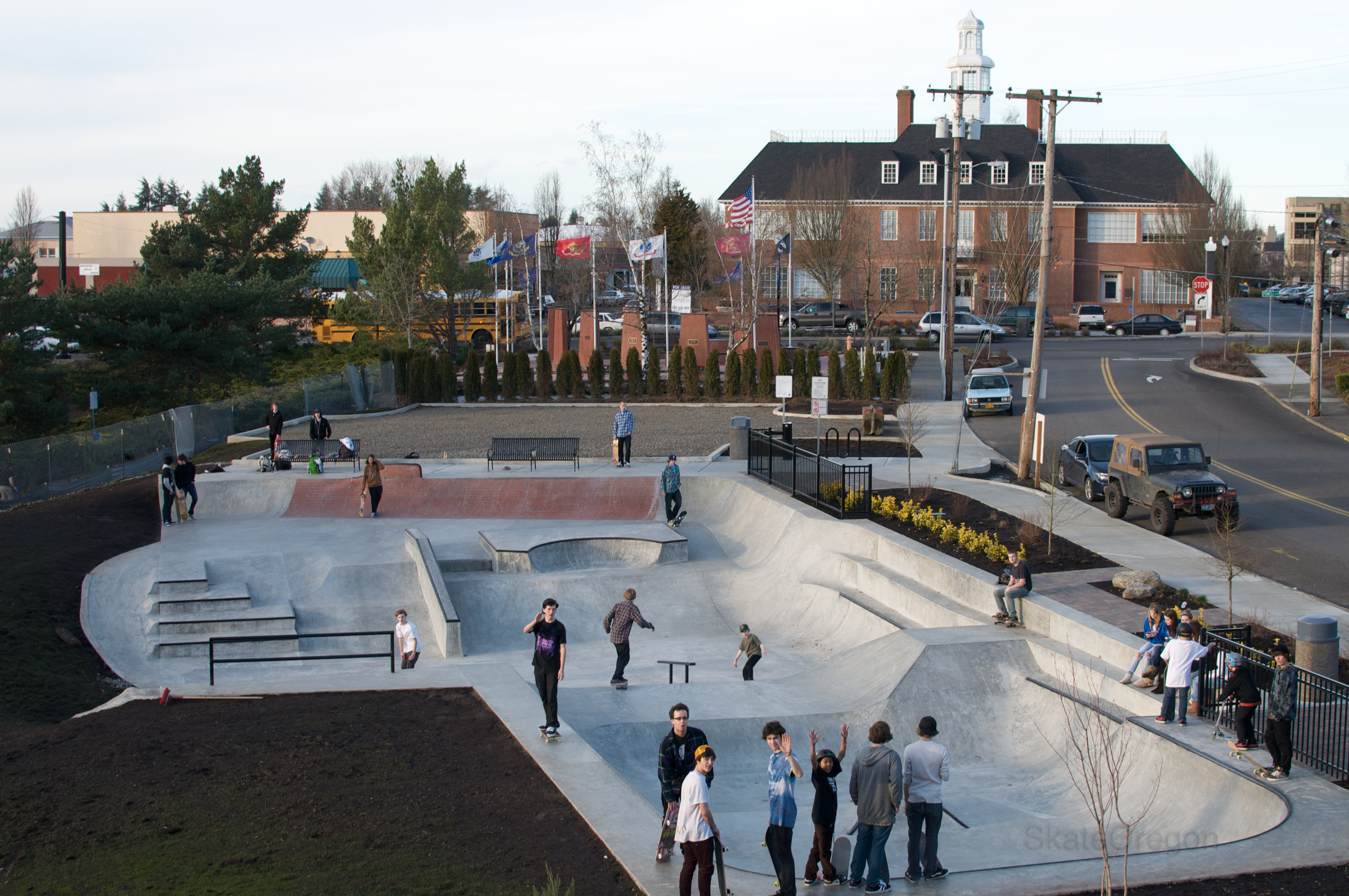
Skatepark, 2010

=== Gresham Japanese Garden ===
In the early 1970s, the Japanese American Citizens League started planting a Japanese garden on Tsuru Island, which was dedicated in 1975. The park was poorly maintained from the 1980s until 2011, when redesigning started. Tsuru Island reopened in 2014 and is volunteer-led.

In 2018, a small public plaza, Ebetsu Plaza, was completed to commemorate the sister city relationship between Gresham and Ebetsu, Japan. In 2022, Hiroshima Peace Garden was completed across from Ebetsu Plaza, planted with seeds from Green Legacy Hiroshima and a mural was painted on the barn. The garden also hosts the Kyoudou Center, an event venue.

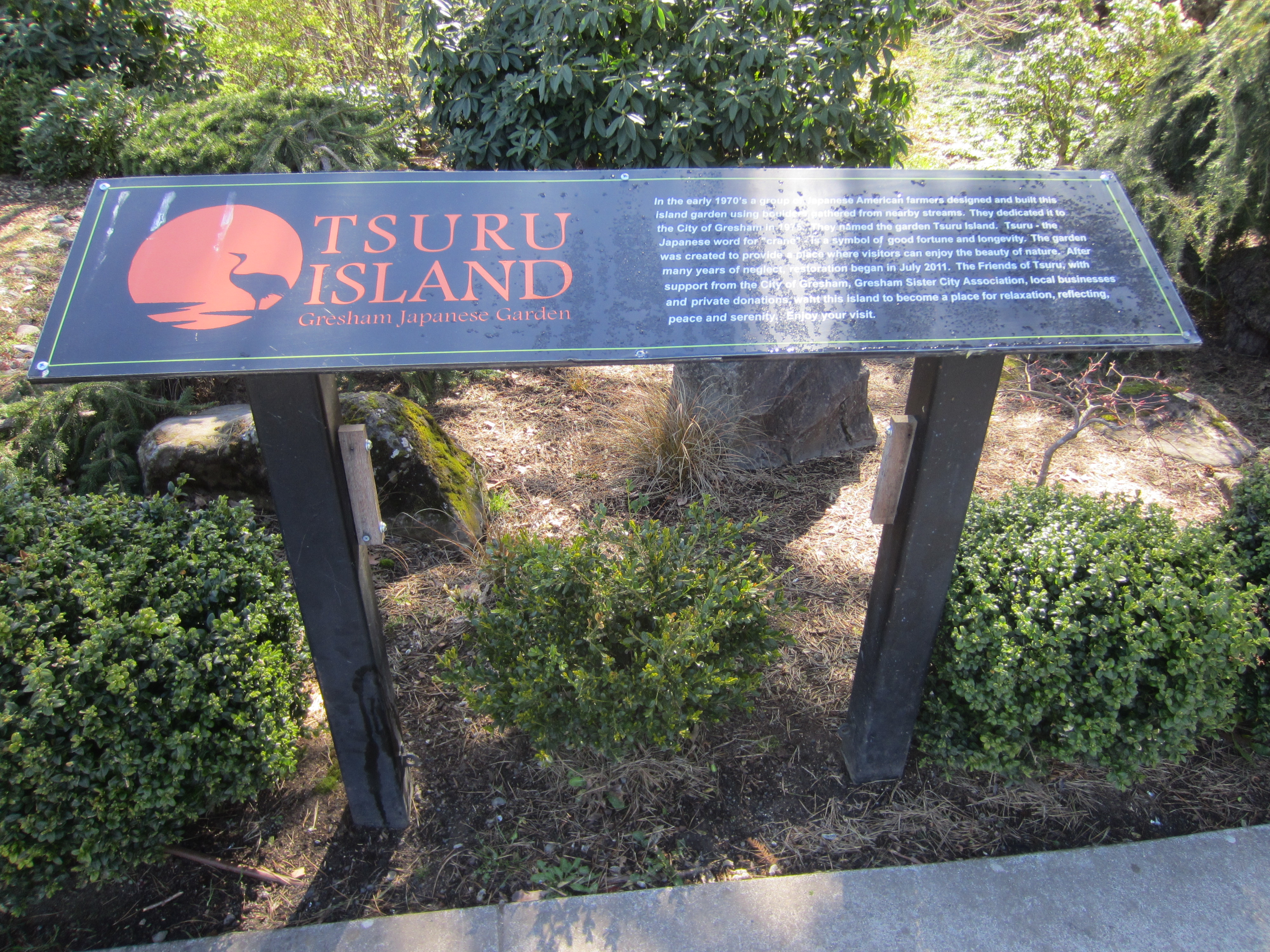

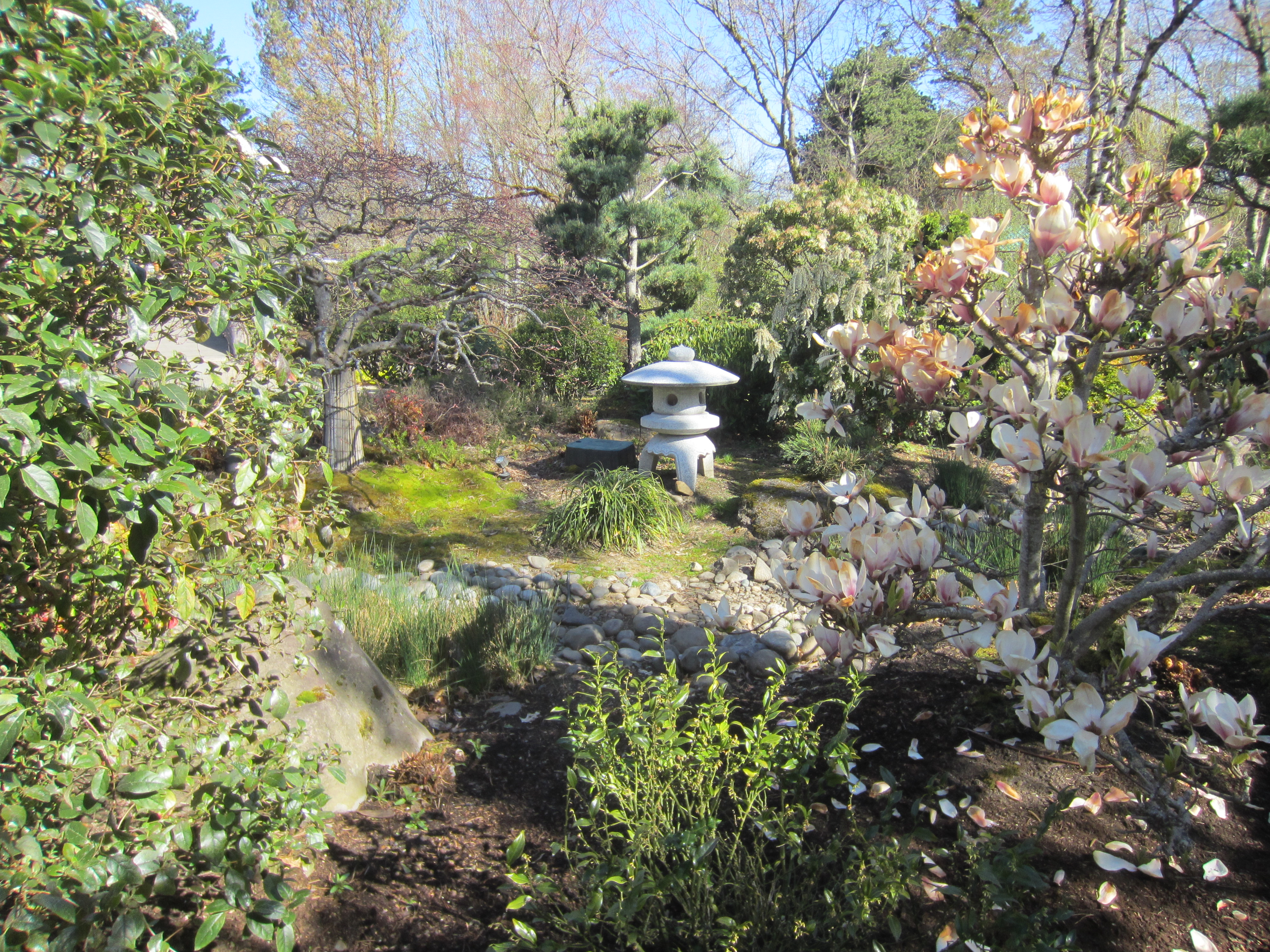

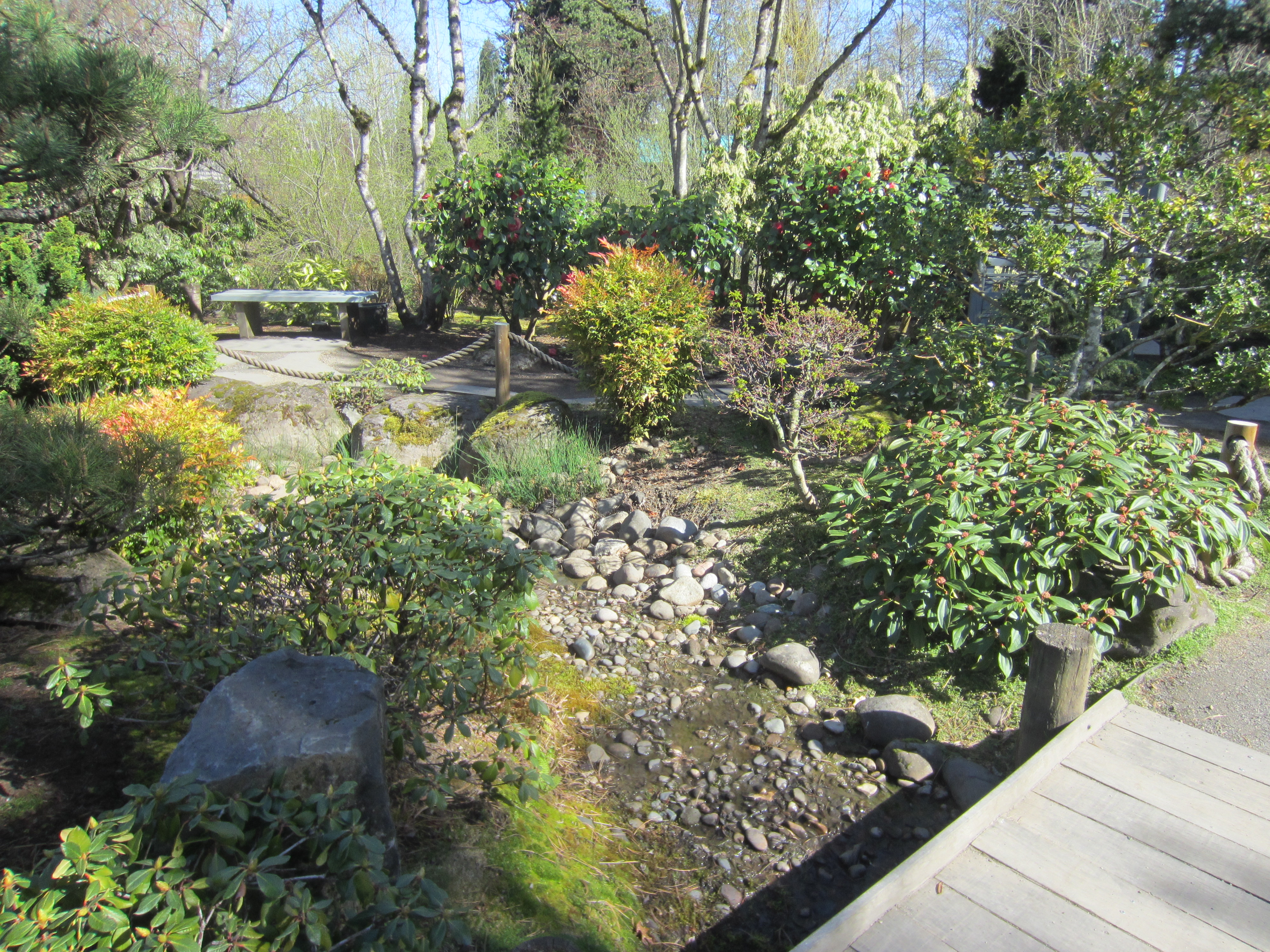

==== Ebetsu Plaza ====
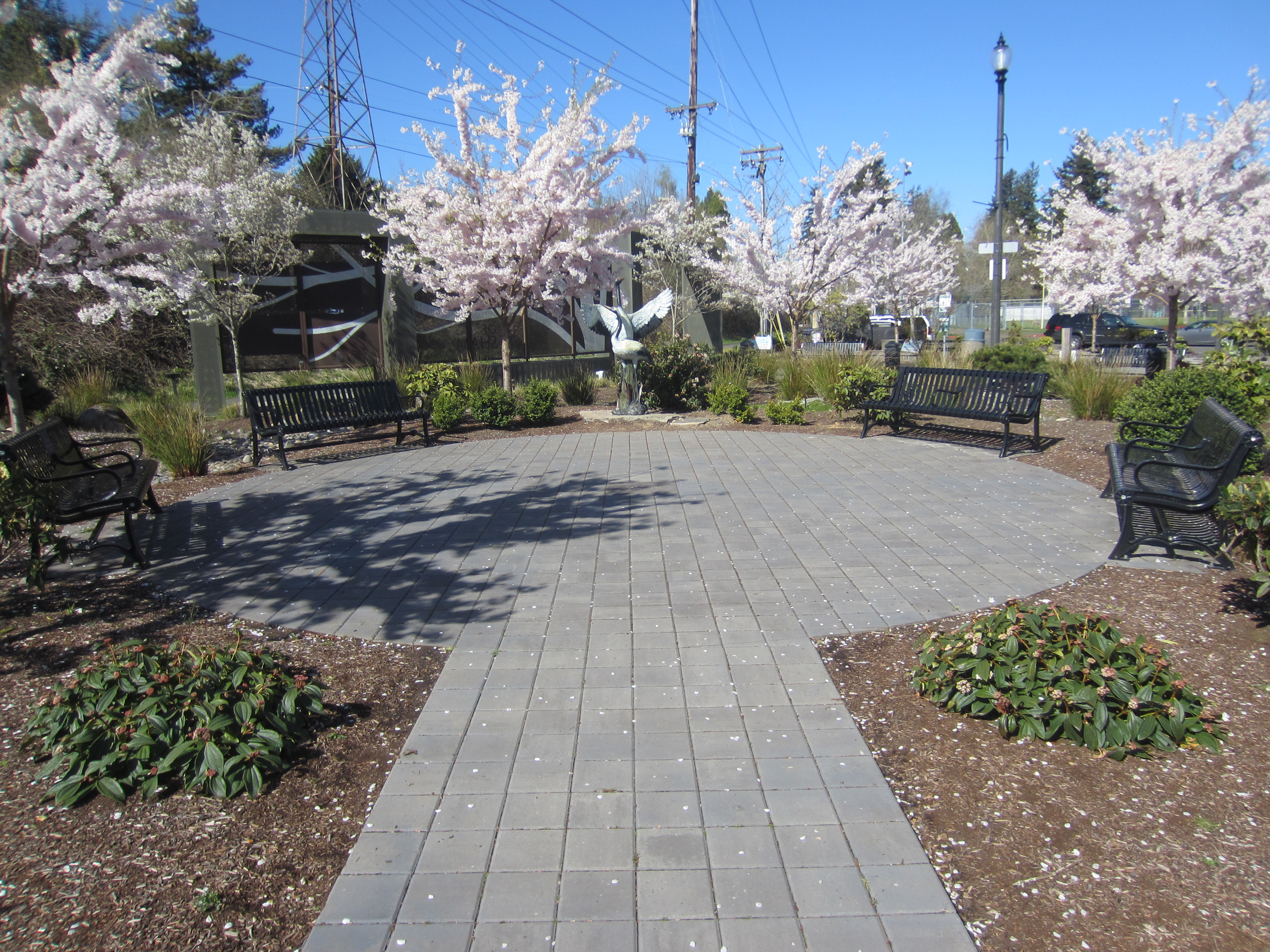

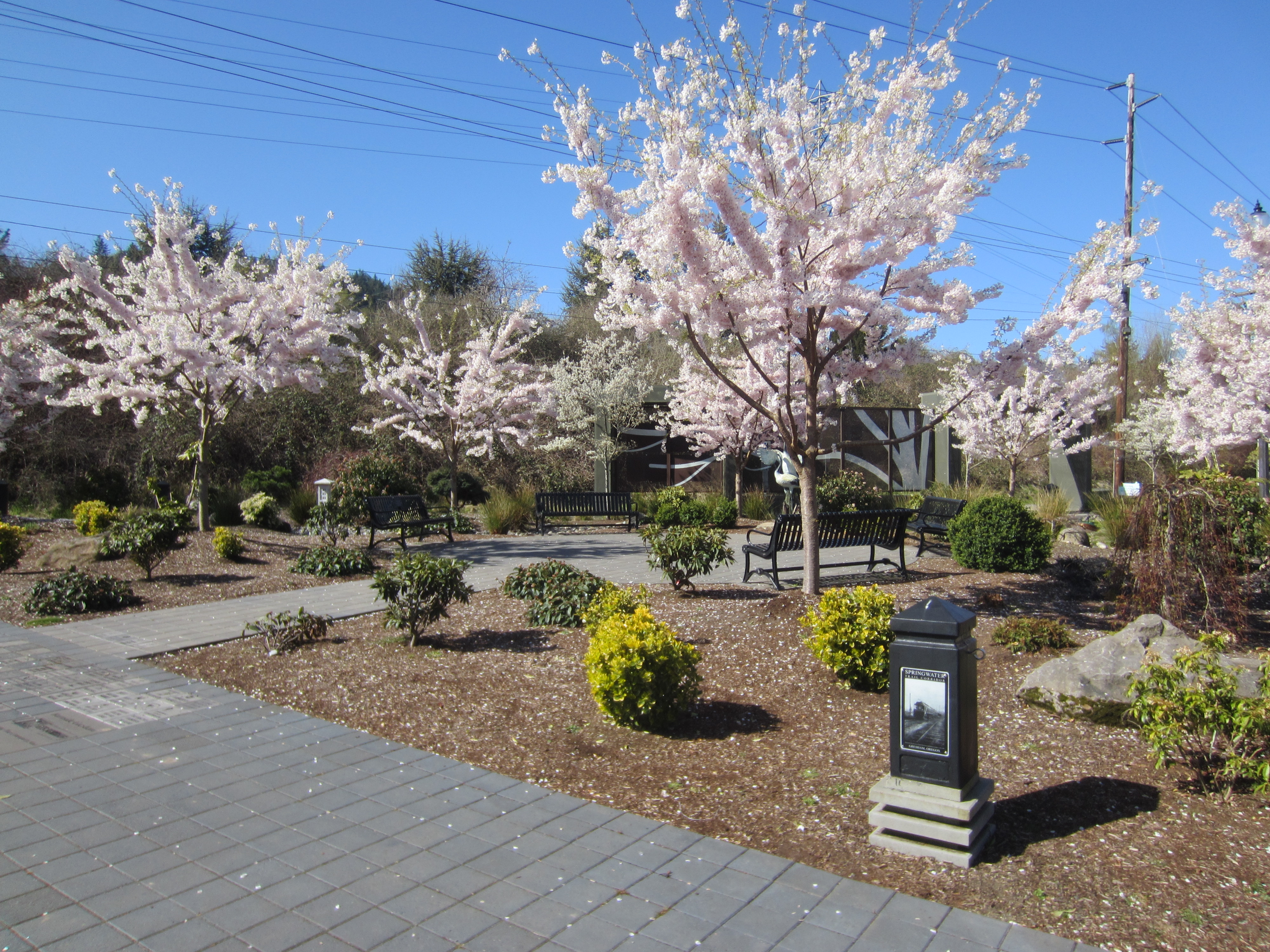

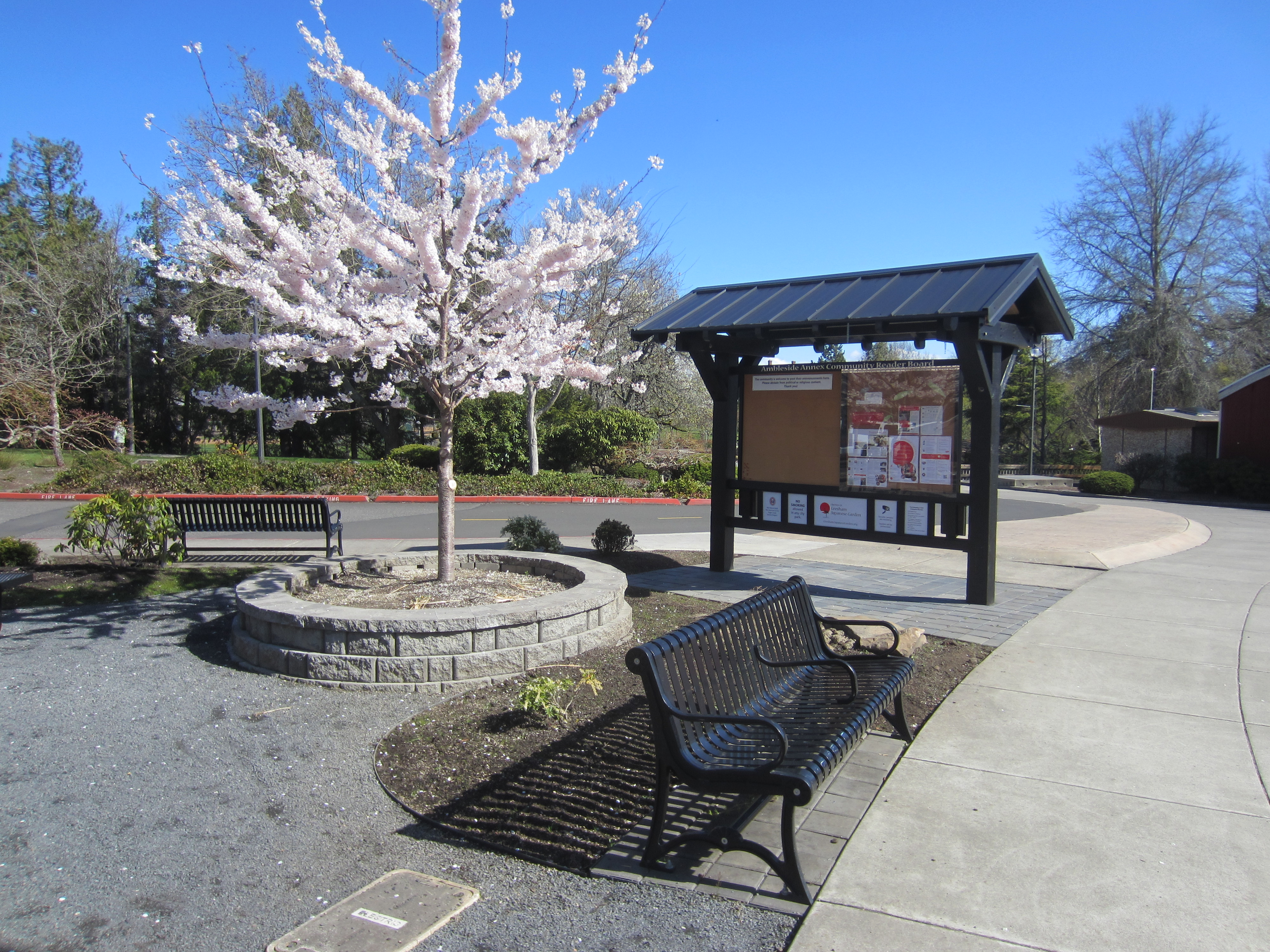

=== Heroes Memorial ===
The Heroes Memorial, completed 2009, is installed in the park's northwest corner. It honors those who have served in the military, fire, and police services and hosts annual remembrance ceremonies on Memorial Day.

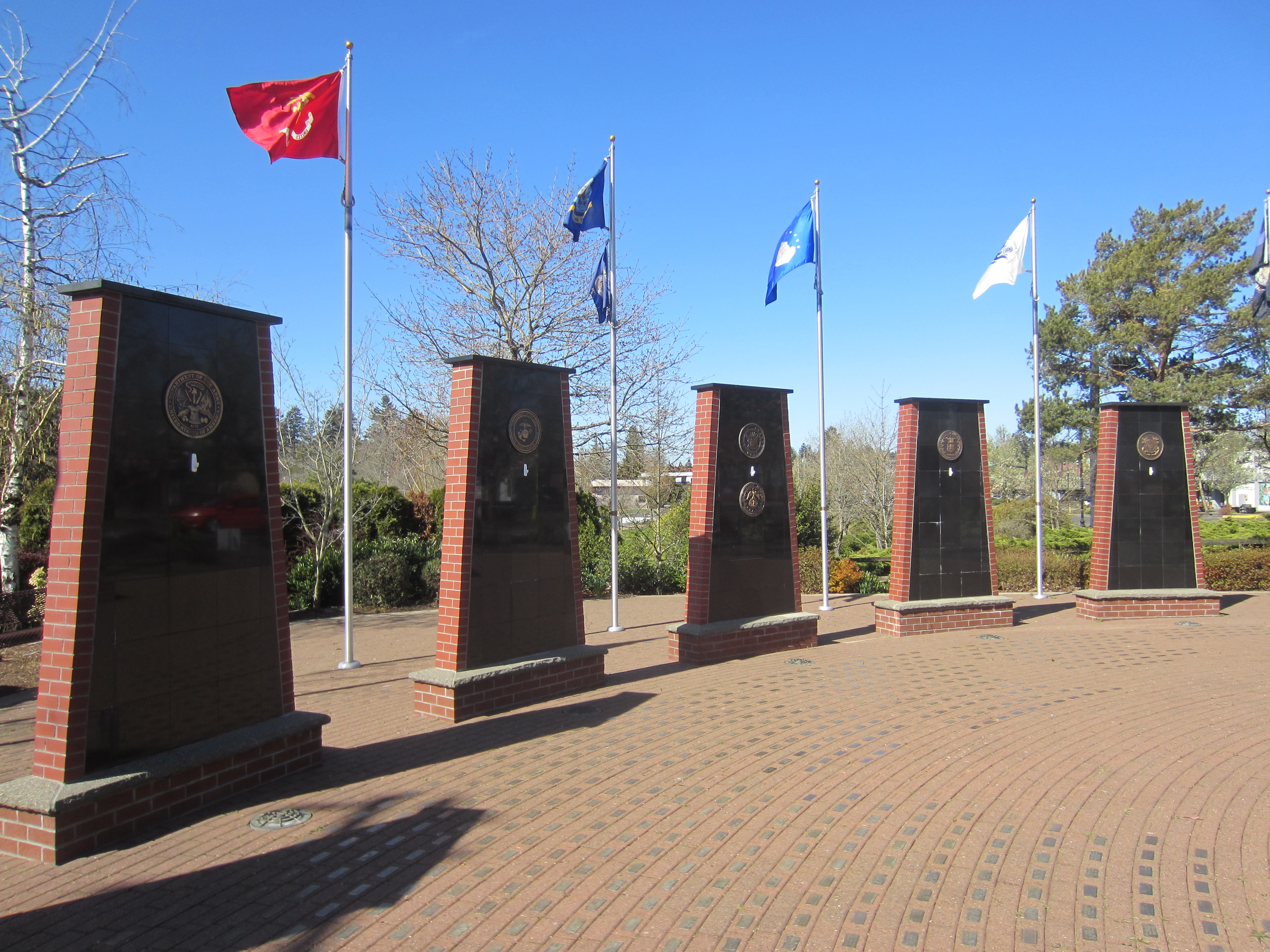

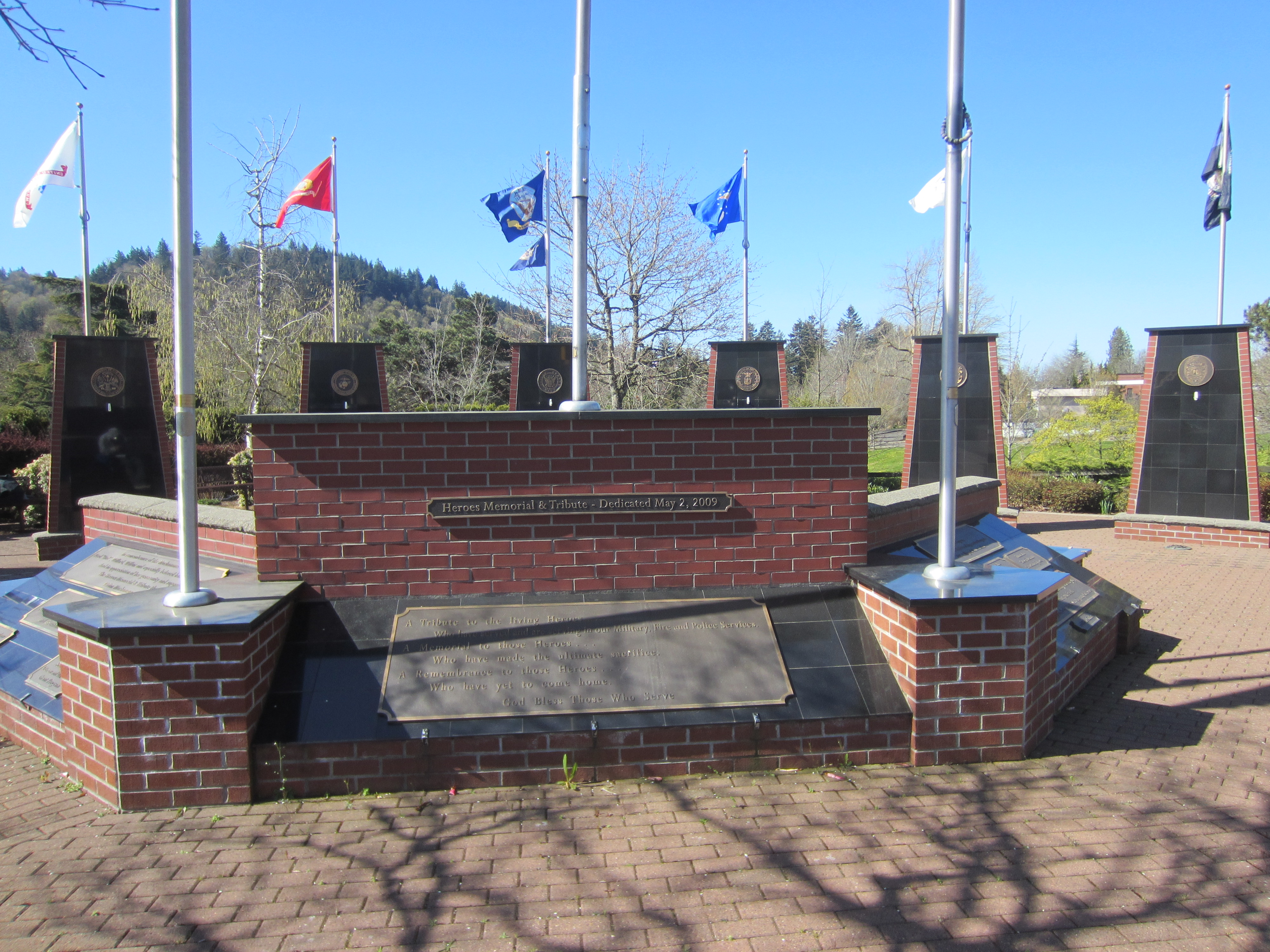

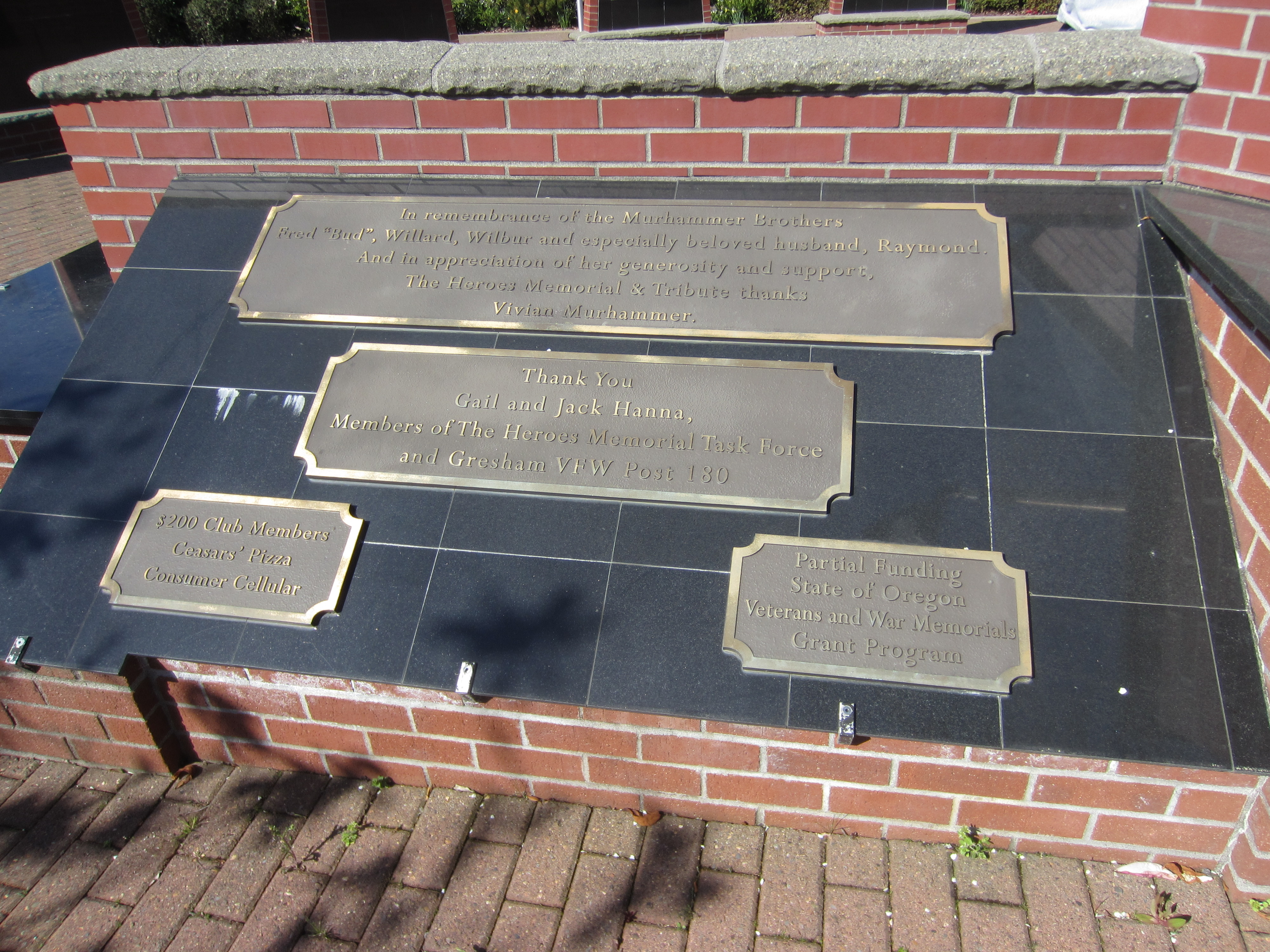
