= Vance Park =

Public park in Gresham, Oregon, U.S.

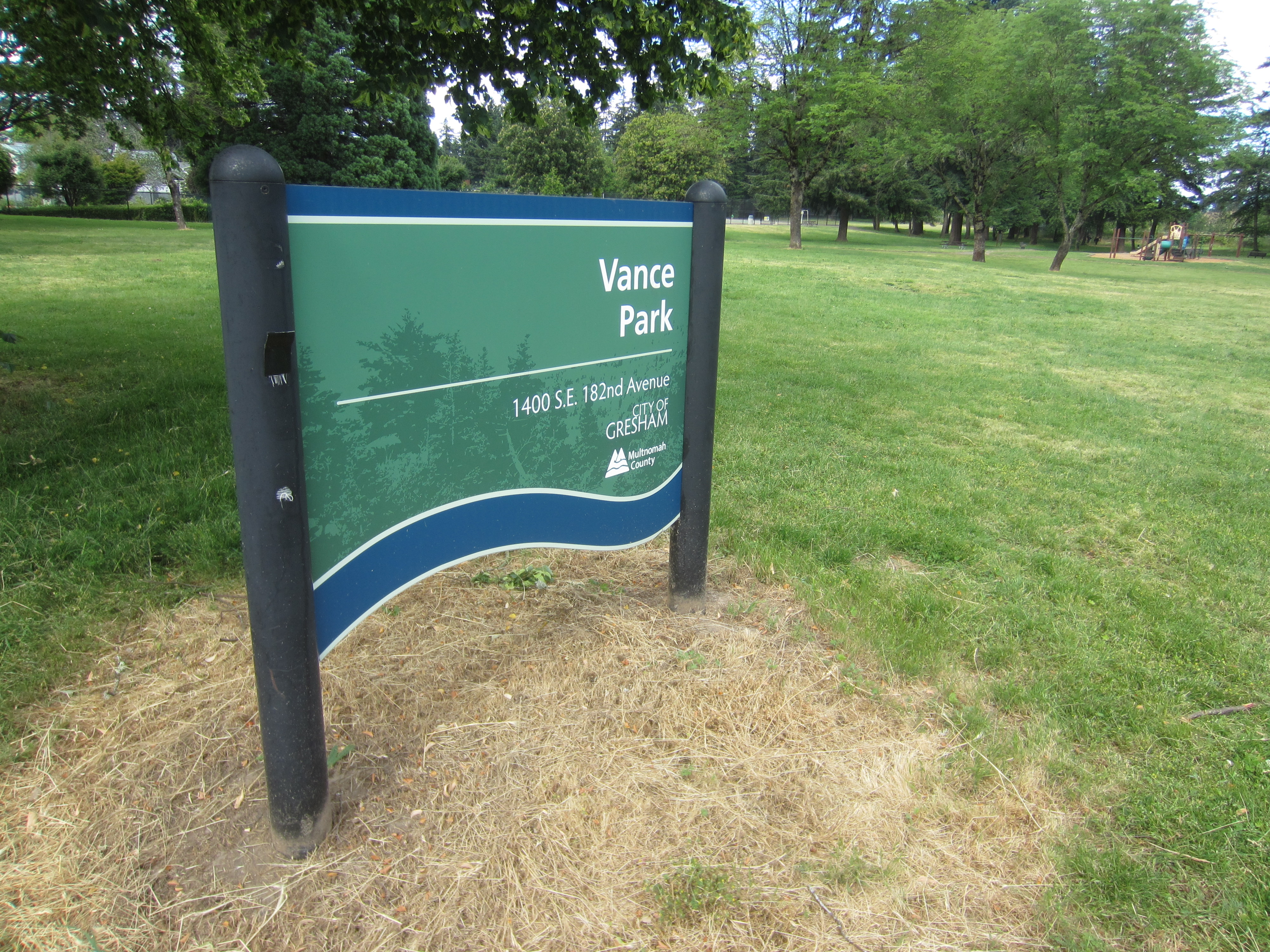
- Park sign, 2022
- Interactive map of Vance Park
- Location: Gresham, Oregon, U.S.
- Coordinates: 45°30′47″N 122°28′27″W
- Created: 1974

Vance Park is a 14.5-acre (5.9 ha) public park in Gresham, Oregon.

The park was first created in 1974.

In 2019, Multnomah County officials began a project to renovate the park, with plans including the integration of adjacent sites of a former landfill and quarry. The project's goals focused on remediating the environmental impact of the past uses and providing green space to marginalized citizens. An official plan of action was released to the public in 2022.
