= Gresham, Oregon =

- City
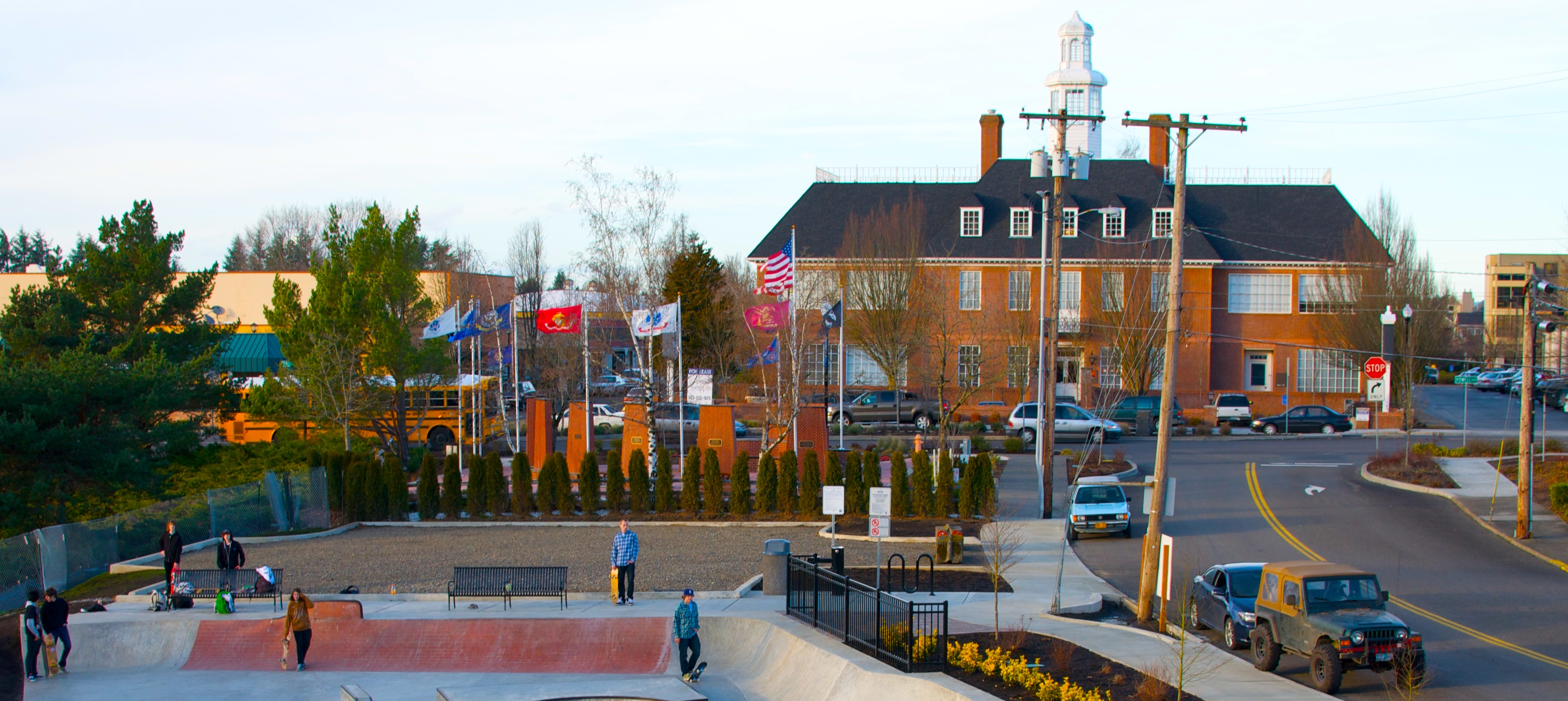
- Downtown Gresham from City Park

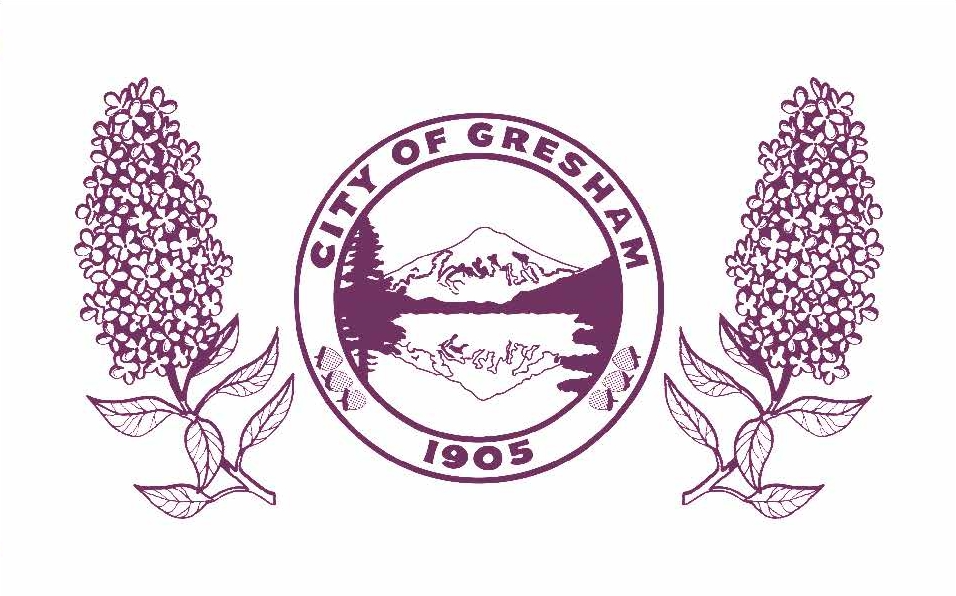
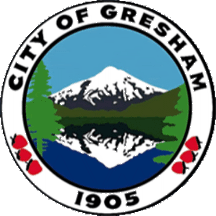
- Flag Seal

- Location in Multnomah County, Oregon
- Coordinates: 45°28′58″N 122°26′00″W
- Country: United States
- State: Oregon
- County: Multnomah
- Settled: 1851
- Incorporated: February 11, 1905
- Named for: Walter Q. Gresham

Government
  - Type: Council–manager
  - Mayor: Travis Stovall

Area
  - City: 23.65 sq mi (61.26 km^{2})
  - Land: 23.52 sq mi (60.91 km^{2})
  - Water: 0.14 sq mi (0.35 km^{2})
- Elevation: 384 ft (117 m)

Population (2020)
  - City: 114,247
  - Estimate (2022): 111,621
  - Rank: US: 273rd OR: 4th
  - Density: 4,857.7/sq mi (1,875.55/km^{2})
  - Urban: 2,104,238 (US: 23rd)
  - Metro: 2,509,489 (US: 25th)
- Time zone: UTC–8 (Pacific (PST))
  - Summer (DST): UTC–7 (PDT)
- ZIP codes: 97030, 97080, 97233
- Area codes: 503 and 971
- FIPS code: 41-31250
- GNIS feature ID: 2410663
- Website: greshamoregon.gov

Gresham (/ˈɡrɛʃəm/ GRESH-əm) is a city in the Willamette Valley, Located in Multnomah County in the U.S. state of Oregon, bordered by Portland to the northwest and partially in the southwest. It was first settled in the early 1850s by the Powell brothers. It remained unincorporated until 1905; it was named after Walter Quintin Gresham, an American Civil War general and United States Secretary of State.

The early economy of the city was primarily supported by agriculture, and by the mid-20th century, the city saw a population boom, increasing from 4,000 residents to more than 10,000 between 1960 and 1970. The population was 114,247 at the 2020 census, making it the second most populous city in the county and the fourth-most populous city in Oregon. Gresham is an economic center for eastern Multnomah County.

== History ==
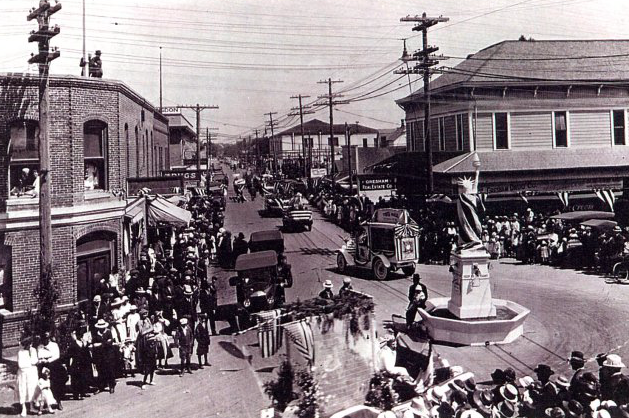
Downtown Gresham in 1918

Prior to settlement, the first documented inhabitants of the Gresham area were Kalapuya Native Americans, who lost a majority of their population to disease by the 1830s.

The area now known as Gresham was first settled in 1851 by brothers Jackson and James Powell, who laid claim to land under the Donation Land Claim Act of 1850 and named the settlement Powell's Valley. In 1884, a local merchant petitioned for a post office from the United States Post Office Department to be established in his store, proposing to name it after Postmaster General Walter Q. Gresham if his request was granted. Concurrently, other community members secured a post office named "Campground," which referred to the area's religious camp meeting site and its convenience as a stop for travelers heading to Portland. Once the Post Office Department recognized its error, it revoked the Campground post office designation.

Gresham was incorporated in 1905, the year of the Lewis and Clark Centennial Exposition; its population at the time was 365. Lewis Shattuck, a member of a pioneer family, served as the first mayor. During that period, trains operated between Gresham and Portland on an hourly schedule. Gresham's early settlers would go on to form the outlying communities of Boring, Sandy, Fairview, and Estacada.

Gresham's early economy was heavily driven by agriculture. The cultivation of berries (particularly raspberries), grapes, and vegetables were its primary economic focus from the 1910s to the 1960s.

Gresham's city library, which began as a small book collection in the town's general store, was officially established as the Gresham Branch Public Library in 1913 with a grant from the Andrew Carnegie library fund.

Gresham General Hospital opened in 1959 in downtown Gresham. In 1984, the hospital moved to Stark Street and became Mount Hood Medical Center.

== Geography ==
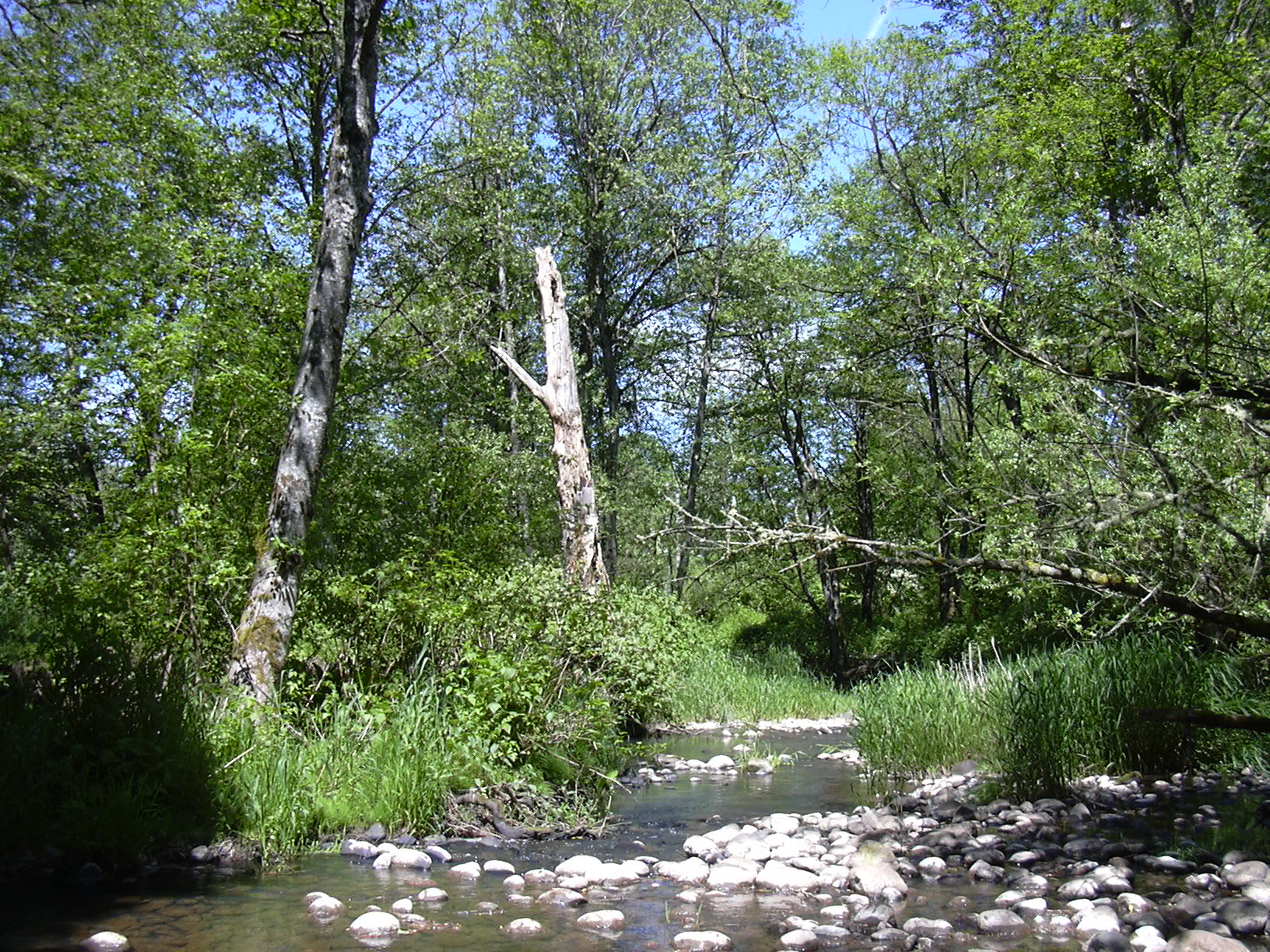
Johnson Creek in Gresham

According to the United States Census Bureau, the city has a total area of 23.43 square miles (60.68 km^{2}), of which 23.20 square miles (60.09 km^{2}) is land and 0.23 square miles (0.60 km^{2}) is water. The total area includes parts of Fairview Creek and Johnson Creek.

Gresham is characterized by hills on its eastern border. Northeast Gresham is also hilly, especially where the city meets Troutdale toward the Columbia River. Its elevation is 325 feet (99 m). Johnson Creek, which begins at the foothills of the Cascade Mountains, runs westward through Gresham, with 23 percent of the creek's watershed running through the city.

=== Neighborhoods ===
The city of Gresham is divided into 16 recognized neighborhoods: Central City, Centennial, Gresham Butte, Historic Southeast, Hogan Cedars, Hollybrook, Kelly Creek, North Central, North Gresham, Northeast, Northwest, Pleasant Valley, Powell Valley, Rockwood, Southwest & Wilkes East.

=== Climate ===
Gresham, like most of western Oregon, has a Mediterranean climate (Köppen Csb/Csa). Summers feature pleasant mornings, very warm and sunny afternoons and only very occasional rainfall, whereas winters are cloudy with cool to cold afternoons, occasional frosts, and frequent long rainy periods.

Climate data for Gresham, OR
Month	Jan	Feb	Mar	Apr	May	Jun	Jul	Aug	Sep	Oct	Nov	Dec	Year
Mean daily maximum °F (°C)	46 (8)	51 (11)	56 (13)	62 (17)	69 (21)	75 (24)	82 (28)	82 (28)	77 (25)	65 (18)	53 (12)	46 (8)	64 (18)
Mean daily minimum °F (°C)	35 (2)	36 (2)	38 (3)	41 (5)	47 (8)	51 (11)	55 (13)	55 (13)	51 (11)	44 (7)	39 (4)	35 (2)	44 (7)
Average precipitation inches (mm)	6.77 (172)	5.16 (131)	4.70 (119)	3.95 (100)	2.93 (74)	2.26 (57)	0.54 (14)	0.69 (18)	1.90 (48)	4.34 (110)	6.93 (176)	7.61 (193)	47.78 (1,212)
Average snowfall inches (cm)	1.5 (3.9)	1.7 (4.3)	1.7 (4.4)	0 (0)	0 (0)	0 (0)	0 (0)	0 (0)	0 (0)	0 (0)	0.2 (0.6)	0.7 (1.7)	5.8 (14.9)
Average rainy days	18.1	16.1	19.3	17.6	13.5	10.9	4.9	4.4	9.7	15	18.5	17.6	165.6
Average snowy days	1.5	2.8	1.7	0.3	0	0	0	0	0	0	0.7	1.2	8.2
Average relative humidity (%)	82	84	81	78	73	71	65	64	69	75	81	82	75
Source 1: weather.com
Source 2: weather atlas(snow - precipitation days-humidity)

== Demographics ==
Historical population
Census	Pop.	Note	%±
1910	510		—
1920	1,103		116.3%
1930	1,635		48.2%
1940	1,951		19.3%
1950	3,049		56.3%
1960	3,944		29.4%
1970	10,030		154.3%
1980	33,005		229.1%
1990	68,235		106.7%
2000	90,205		32.2%
2010	105,594		17.1%
2020	114,247		8.2%
2025 (est.)	111,513		−2.4%
U.S. Decennial Census; 2020 Census

=== Racial and ethnic composition ===
Gresham, Oregon – Racial and ethnic composition Note: the US Census treats Hispanic/Latino as an ethnic category. This table excludes Latinos from the racial categories and assigns them to a separate category. Hispanics/Latinos may be of any race.
Race / Ethnicity (NH = Non-Hispanic)	Pop 2000	Pop 2010	Pop 2020	% 2000	% 2010	% 2020
White alone (NH)	71,194	72,549	68,097	78.92%	68.71%	59.61%
Black or African American alone (NH)	1,618	3,530	5,665	1.79%	3.34%	4.96%
Native American or Alaska Native alone (NH)	704	808	878	0.78%	0.77%	0.77%
Asian alone (NH)	2,969	4,446	6,791	3.29%	4.21%	5.94%
Pacific Islander alone (NH)	217	698	1,213	0.24%	0.66%	1.06%
Other race alone (NH)	99	148	559	0.11%	0.14%	0.49%
Mixed Race or Multi-Racial (NH)	2,672	3,431	7,001	2.96%	3.25%	6.13%
Hispanic or Latino (any race)	10,732	19,984	24,043	11.90%	18.93%	21.04%
Total	90,205	105,594	114,247	100.00%	100.00%	100.00%

=== 2020 census ===
As of the 2020 census, Gresham had a population of 114,247, a median age of 36.3 years, 23.6% of residents under the age of 18, and 15.1% of residents 65 years of age or older. For every 100 females there were 96.0 males, and for every 100 females age 18 and over there were 93.0 males age 18 and over.

According to the 2020 Decennial Census Demographic and Housing Characteristics, 99.9% of residents lived in urban areas while 0.1% lived in rural areas.

There were 41,333 households in Gresham, of which 33.6% had children under the age of 18 living in them. Of all households, 43.6% were married-couple households, 18.4% were households with a male householder and no spouse or partner present, and 28.4% were households with a female householder and no spouse or partner present. About 24.3% of all households were made up of individuals and 10.5% had someone living alone who was 65 years of age or older.

There were 42,944 housing units, of which 3.8% were vacant. Among occupied housing units, 52.5% were owner-occupied and 47.5% were renter-occupied. The homeowner vacancy rate was 0.8% and the rental vacancy rate was 4.5%.

Racial composition as of the 2020 census
Race	Number	Percent
White	71,835	62.9%
Black or African American	5,957	5.2%
American Indian and Alaska Native	1,882	1.6%
Asian	6,886	6.0%
Native Hawaiian and Other Pacific Islander	1,251	1.1%
Some other race	13,106	11.5%
Two or more races	13,330	11.7%
Hispanic or Latino (of any race)	24,043	21.0%

=== 2010 census ===
As of the 2010 census, there were 105,594 people, 38,704 households, and 25,835 families residing in the city. The population density was 4,551.5 inhabitants per square mile (1,757.3/km^{2}). There were 41,015 housing units at an average density of 1,767.9 per square mile (682.6/km^{2}). The racial makeup of the city was 76.0% White, 3.5% African American, 1.3% Native American, 4.3% Asian, 0.7% Pacific Islander, 9.8% from other races, and 4.5% from two or more races. Hispanic or Latino of any race were 18.9% of the population.

There were 38,704 households, of which 36.9% had children under the age of 18 living with them, 46.6% were married couples living together, 14.3% had a female householder with no husband present, 5.9% had a male householder with no wife present, and 33.2% were non-families. 25.2% of all households were made up of individuals, and 8.8% had someone living alone who was 65 years of age or older. The average household size was 2.69 and the average family size was 3.22.

The median age in the city was 33.6 years. 26.4% of residents were under the age of 18; 10.2% were between the ages of 18 and 24; 28.1% were from 25 to 44; 24.5% were from 45 to 64; and 10.7% were 65 years of age or older. The gender makeup of the city was 49.0% male and 51.0% female.

=== 2000 census ===
As of 2000 the median income for a household in the city was $43,442, and the mean income for a family was $51,126. Males had a median income of $37,701 versus $27,744 for females. That is a difference of $9,957. The per capita income for the city was $19,588. About 8.4% of families and 12.5% of the population were below the poverty line, including 17.2% of those under the age of 18 and 6.7% of those 65 and older.

2005-2007 American Community Survey Estimates

- 83.9% - White (71.1 non-Hispanic White)
- 18.3% - Hispanic or Latino (of any race)
- 5.1% - Asian
- 5.1% - Some other race
- 4.7% - American Indian or Alaska Native
- 3.7% - African American or Black
- 0.3% - Native Hawaiian and Other Pacific Islander

== Arts and culture ==
=== Historic sites ===
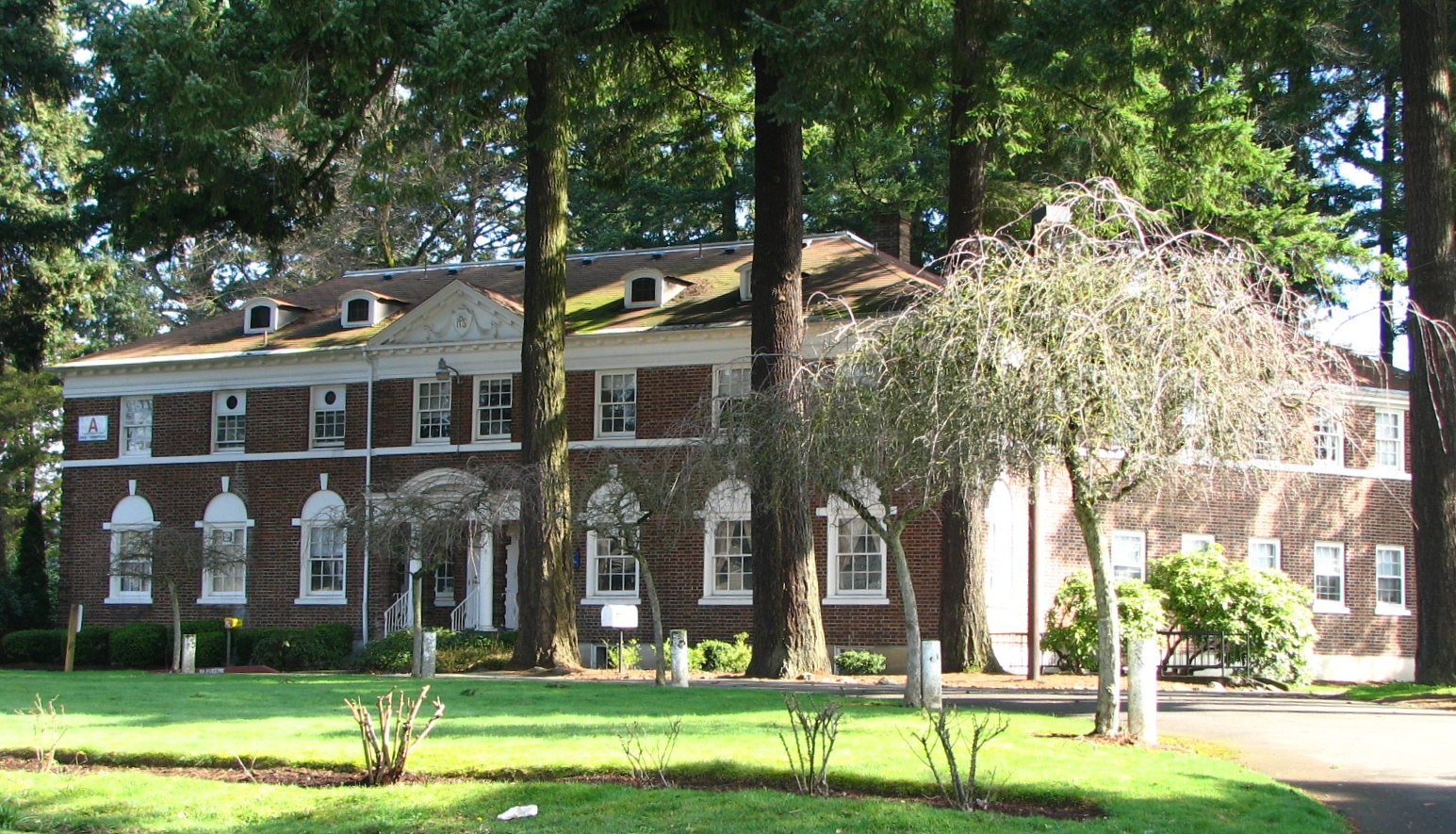
Louise Home Hospital and Residence Hall

There are several National Register of Historic Places sites located in Gresham. The Louise Home Hospital and Residence Hall, is located in west Gresham, and serves as a social services facility. Other sites include: the Jacob Zimmerman House, a farmhouse built by German-American settlers in 1874; the Hamlin–Johnson House, a farmhouse built in 1888; the Emanuel and Christina Anderson House and William Gedamke House, both Victorian Queen Anne homes built circa 1900; the Gresham Carnegie Library, built in 1913; the Dr. Herbert H. Hughes House, built in 1922; the Charles and Fae Olson House, a modernist home built in 1946; and the David and Marianne Ott House, a ranch home built in 1952.

== Parks and recreation ==
There are numerous parks in Gresham, such as Main City Park, located near downtown Gresham. Other parks include Hogan Butte Nature Park, East Gresham Park, Pat Pfeifer Park, Thom Park, Red Sunset Park, Rockwood Central Park, Vance Park, Southwest Community Park, and Clatsop Butte Park, an upland butte located south of Powell Butte. Other public points of interest are Persimmon Country Club, Gresham Golf Course Mt. Hood Theatre and Gresham Pioneer Cemetery which was founded in 1859 and lies on the east side of Southwest Walters Road.

=== Bicycle/pedestrian trails ===
- Springwater Corridor
- 40-Mile Loop
- Gresham–Fairview Trail
- Gresham Butte Saddle Trail
- Kelly Creek Greenway Trail
- Nadaka Loop Trail

== Government ==
The City of Gresham operates under the council–manager form of government. The mayor and city council are elected to be the legislative and policy-making body for the city.

The council appoints a city manager who is responsible for the daily operations of the city. The city manager is Eric Schmidt, appointed in June 2024 (and previously serving in an Interim role effective December 2023).

The city council consists of the mayor and six councilors, all of whom serve four-year terms. Elections are held in November of even-numbered years. In election years divisible by four, (e.g., 2000, 2004, 2008), three councilors are elected. In election years not divisible by four, (e.g., 1998, 2002, 2006), the other three councilors and the mayor are elected.

== Education ==
Gresham is served by three school districts: Centennial, Gresham-Barlow, and Reynolds. High schools include Gresham High School, Sam Barlow High School, Springwater Trail High School, Centennial High School, and Reynolds High School. Private schools include Portland Adventist Elementary School, and Eastside Christian School.

Mount Hood Community College is also located in Gresham, it offers associate degrees, as well as bachelor's programs through a partnership with Eastern Oregon University. According to the US Census, 27.16% of the Gresham residents had a bachelor's degree, while 9.93% had earned a master's degree or above.

== Infrastructure ==
=== Transportation ===
==== Highways ====
Gresham is accessed from the west via Interstate 84 and via U.S. Route 26 from the east.

==== Mass transit ====
Gresham is serviced by TriMet's bus system and the MAX Light Rail Blue Line, which includes the following MAX stations:

- East 162nd Avenue
- East 172nd Avenue
- East 181st Avenue
- Rockwood/East 188th Avenue (serving the Rockwood neighborhood)
- Ruby Junction/East 197th Avenue
- Civic Drive
- Gresham City Hall
- Gresham Central Transit Center
- Cleveland Avenue (the Blue Line's eastern terminus)

Gresham is also served by the fareless Sandy Area Metro shuttle bus to Sandy, Oregon.

== Notable people ==
- Shannon Bex (b. 1980), member of Danity Kane
- Brian Burres (b. 1981), Major League Baseball pitcher
- Josh Cameron (b. 1986), soccer player
- Randy Couture (b. 1963), mixed martial arts fighter
- Sam Crouser (b. 1991), Olympic athlete
- Marco Farfan (b. 1998), soccer player
- Nikki Fuller (b. 1968), professional female bodybuilder
- Robert Garrigus (b. 1977), PGA Tour
- Katie Harman (b. 1980), Miss America 2002
- Jess Hartley (b. 1967), author, editor, and tabletop game designer
- Fred Jones (b. 1979), National Basketball Association player
- Fouad Kaady (January 8, 1978 – September 8, 2005), a resident who was shot to death by police after being injured in a car wreck
- Robert S. Lucas, U.S. Coast Guard Rear Admiral
- Ronald A. Marks, former CIA official
- Khamphoui Sisavatdy, prime minister of the Gresham-headquartered Royal Lao Government in Exile
- Stu Weber, Christian author
- Maiah Wynne (b. 1996), singer-songwriter

== Sister cities ==
Gresham's sister cities are:

- Ebetsu, Japan (1977)
- Owerri, Nigeria (1991)
- Sokcho, South Korea (1985)
