= Rockwood Central Park =

Public park in Gresham, Oregon, U.S.

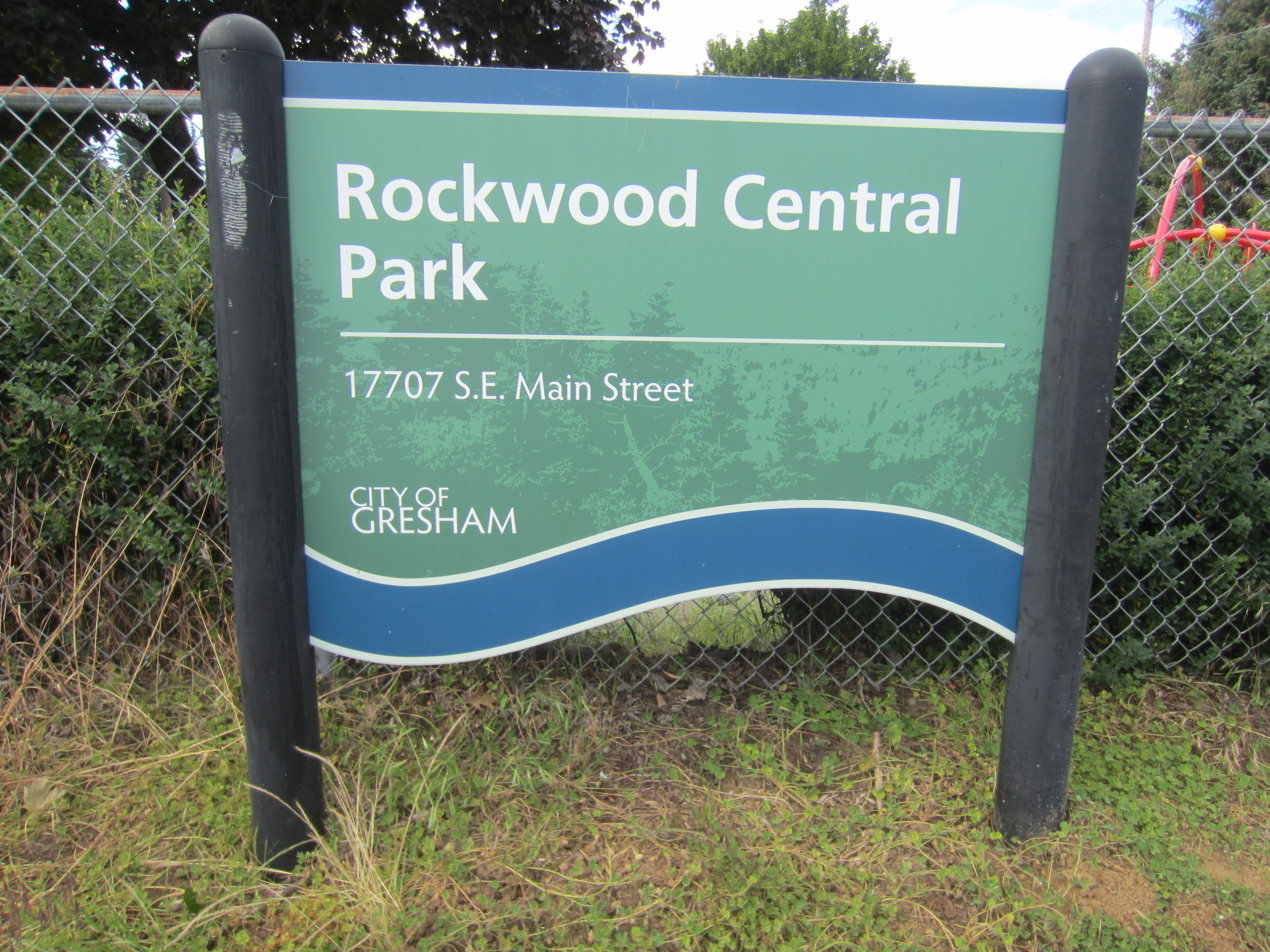
- Park sign, 2022
- Interactive map of Rockwood Central Park
- Location: Gresham, Oregon, U.S.
- Coordinates: 45°30′53″N 122°28′50″W

Rockwood Central Park is a 9.4-acre (3.8 ha) public park in Gresham, Oregon. It includes two playgrounds, a basketball court, and a disc golf area.
