= Southwest Community Park (Gresham, Oregon) =

Public park in Gresham, Oregon, U.S.

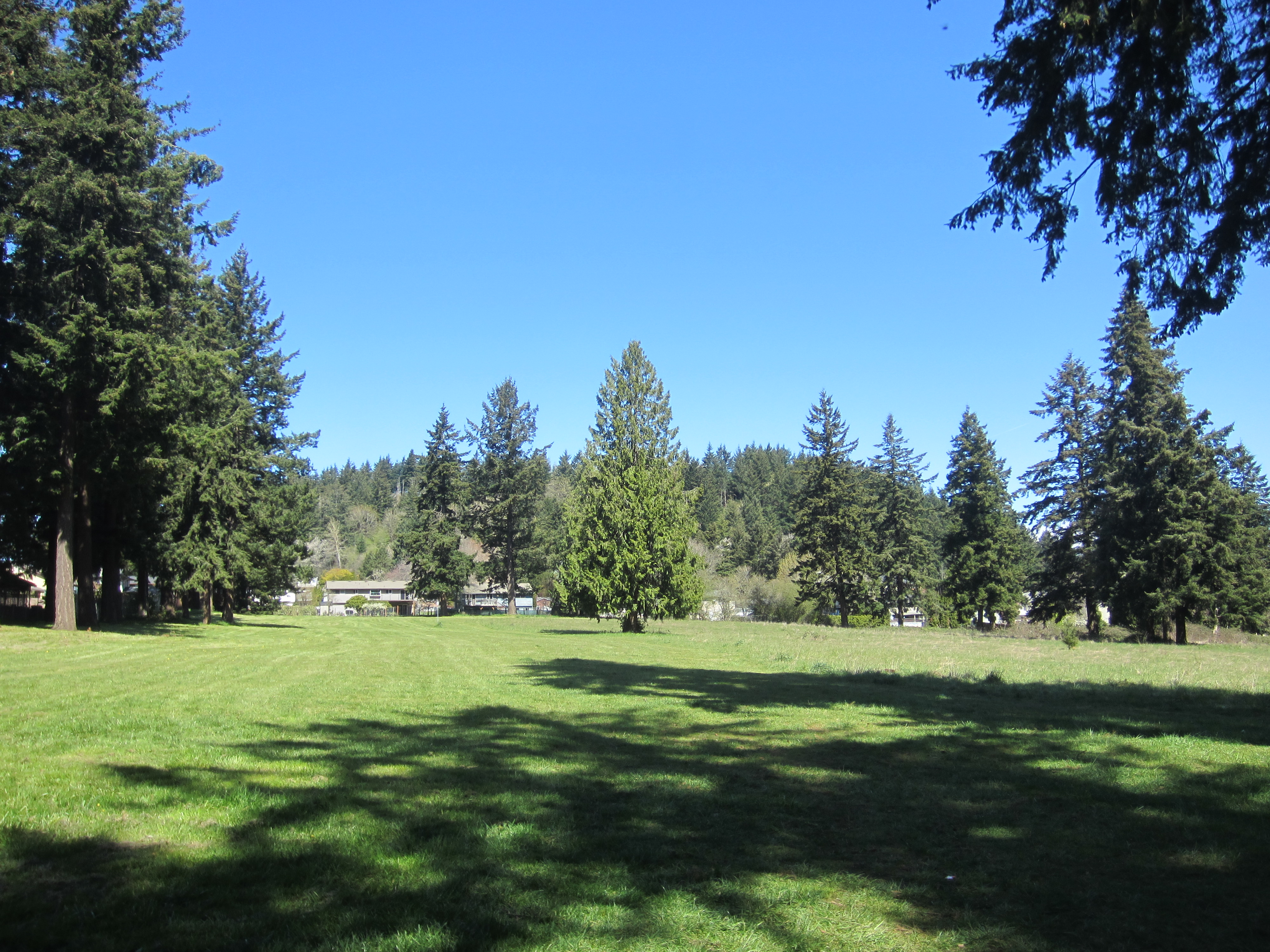
- Part of the park in 2021

- Location within Oregon
- Location: Gresham, Oregon, United States
- Coordinates: 45°29′39″N 122°28′5″W

Southwest Community Park is a public park in Gresham, Oregon, United States. As of January 2025 it has not been developed, and most of the 34.1 acres are made up of grassy fields and evergreen trees (such as Douglas fir and red cedar).
