= Killing of Cheryl Noel =

Killing by Baltimore County, Maryland police during no-knock drug raid

On January 21, 2005, Cheryl Noel, a 44-year-old woman living in Baltimore County, Maryland, was shot and killed by police. Noel was killed during a no knock drug raid by a SWAT team. Due to the early hour and lack of announced entry, Noel employed a legally possessed handgun to defend herself and her home. This raid, its result and its justification have become controversial.

A very similar controversial killing by the same officer occurred in 2012.

After Noel's death, her family filed a lawsuit against the Baltimore Police Department for her death. In 2011, a Federal appeals court upheld a verdict finding that the Baltimore Police force did not use excessive force in the raid that caused Noel's death.
