= Albertina Kerr Nursery =

Historic building in Portland, Oregon, U.S.

- U.S. National Register of Historic Places
- Portland Historic Landmark
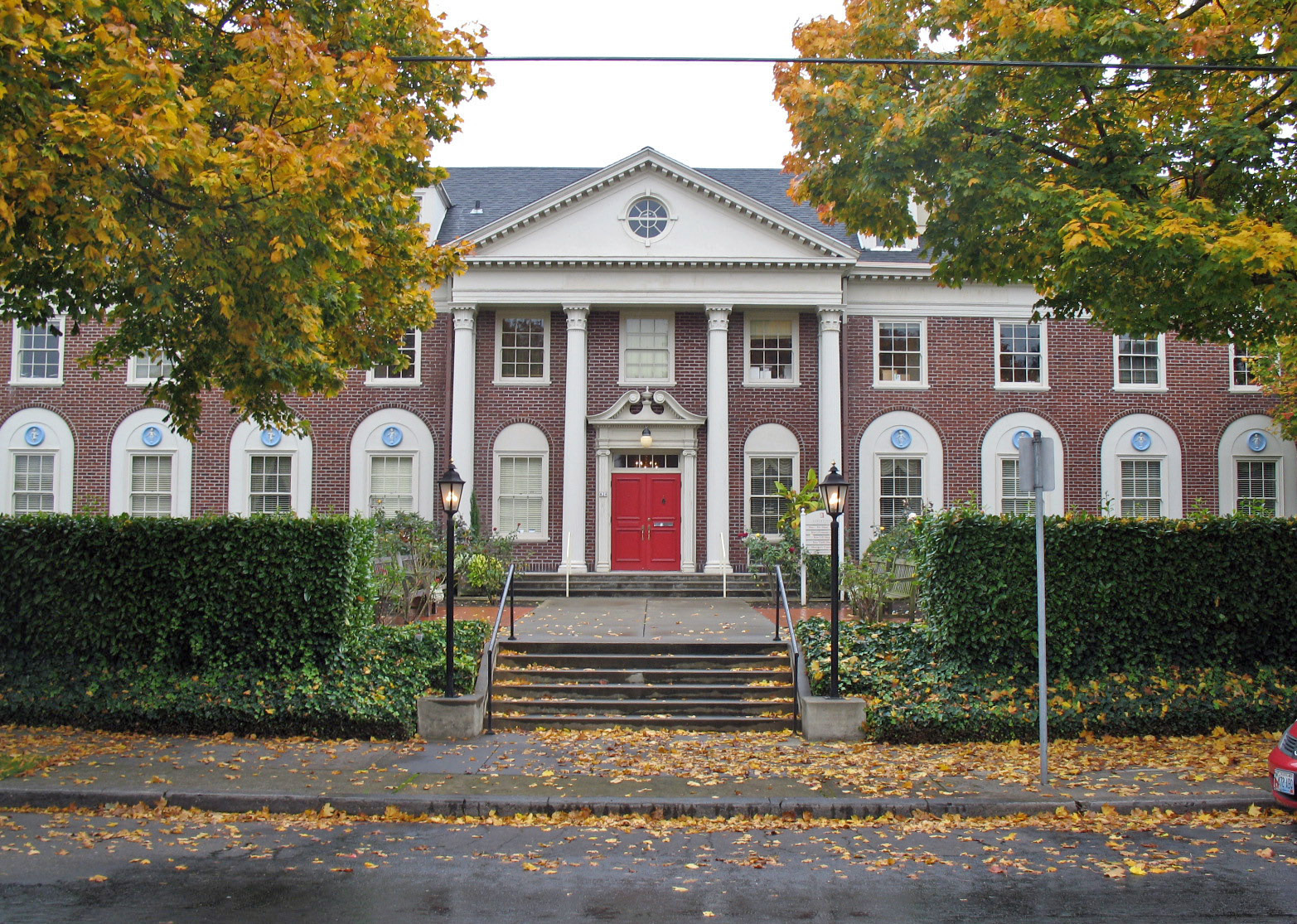

- Location within Portland, Oregon
- Location: 424 NE 22nd Avenue; Portland, Oregon
- Coordinates: 45°31′34″N 122°38′35″W
- Area: 1 acre (0.40 ha)
- Built: 1921
- Architect: Johnson, Parker & Wallwork
- Architectural style: Colonial Revival, Other, Georgian Revival
- NRHP reference No.: 79002135
- Added to NRHP: August 29, 1979

The Albertina Kerr Nursery is a historic building located at 424 NE 22nd Avenue in Northeast Portland, Oregon. It was built by the Johnson, Parker & Wallwork architecture firm in 1921, and was listed on the National Register of Historic Places on August 29, 1979.

== See also ==
- Albertina Kerr
- National Register of Historic Places listings in Northeast Portland, Oregon
