= Killing of Fouad Kaady =

American shot by police

Fouad Kaady (January 8, 1978 – September 8, 2005) was a resident of Gresham, Oregon who was shot to death by police after being injured in a car wreck.

== Police encounter ==
Fouad slammed his car into two others before crashing his vehicle. His family claims that a gas can in his vehicle exploded in the final crash, setting Fouad on fire, and this was the reason for his erratic driving. Fouad emerged from the wreckage, burned, dazed and nude. Williams J. Bergin, a Sandy, Oregon police officer and David. E. Willard, a Clackamas County deputy, arrived at the scene and observed that Kaady was naked and sitting "Indian style" on the ground and had severe burns all over his body. He was ordered to lie face down on the ground, despite his injuries. When Kaady failed to comply with orders to lie on the ground they used a taser on him multiple times. Kaady allegedly climbed a patrol car and appeared poised to jump the Sandy officer according to official reports; at this point, he was shot seven times and later pronounced dead at the scene. The time between the officers arrival at the scene and the firing of shots was 28 seconds.

Eyewitness accounts of the incident are split, with some individuals outraged that the officers used deadly force, stating Fouad was unarmed, naked, badly burned and confused, and had not provoked the officers, and others convinced that the officers acted appropriately. However, there are discrepancies between the shared account of the enforcing officers and the separate witnesses who saw the scene. A subsequent internal investigation ultimately cleared the officers of any misconduct.

== Civil trial ==
Kaady's family hired the law firm of American trial lawyer Gerry Spence. The family filed a lawsuit in September 2006 against Clackamas county, county sheriff Deputy David E. Willard, the city of Sandy and former officer William J. Bergin. Bergin who joined the Sandy police force in May 2005, was off the force due to criminal activity, and due to unrelated activity pled guilty to official misconduct in June 2009. The family alleged that the police used excessive force, made an unconstitutional arrest and caused a wrongful death, among other charges. In 2009 a one-million-dollar settlement with the city of Sandy was reached. A settlement with Clackamas County of one million dollars was reached in March 2010. In both cases neither defendant admitted to any wrongdoing. A Sandy City manager and the attorney representing Clackamas County said that the settlements were offered by the insurance carriers as business decisions.

== Federal judge ruling on use of taser on Kaady ==
On January 30, 2009 Judge Paul Papak concluded that Sandy police officers should have known that, if an individual is not posing an immediate threat, police are not allowed to use tasers on an individual simply because the individual is not complying with commands. The hearing was part of the Kaady family's lawsuit. Shortly after this hearing a report on the Portland Police called for improved restrictive guidelines for using less lethal weapons such as bean bag guns and Tasers.
