= East County (Oregon) =

- Region of the Portland Metro Area
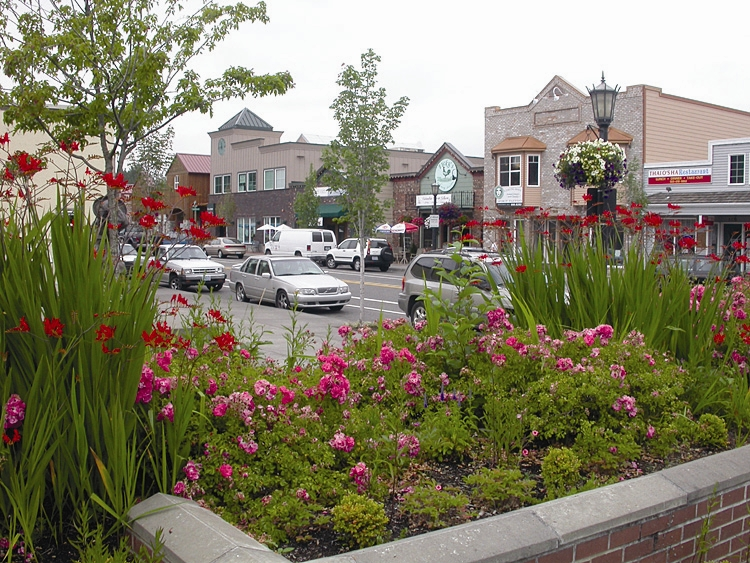
- Troutdale, one of the cities in East County
- County: Multnomah County

Population
  - Total: 158,938

East County is a region of Multnomah County, Oregon, in the Portland metropolitan area. It is generally defined as being the entirety of Multnomah County east of Portland.

== Geography ==
While there is no official geographic definition, most consider it to include the entirety of Multnomah County east of the city of Portland. Some people do consider much of East Portland to also be in East County.

== Populated places ==
=== Incorporated cities ===
- Gresham – 114,247
- Fairview – 10,424
- Troutdale – 16,300
- Wood Village – 4,387

=== Unincorporated communities and CDPs ===
- Corbett – 3,947
- Orient – 462

== Education ==
=== Primary and secondary schools ===
East County is served by Gresham-Barlow School District, Reynolds School District, and Corbett School District.

=== Higher education ===
The East County city of Gresham is home to Mt. Hood Community College.

== Landmarks ==
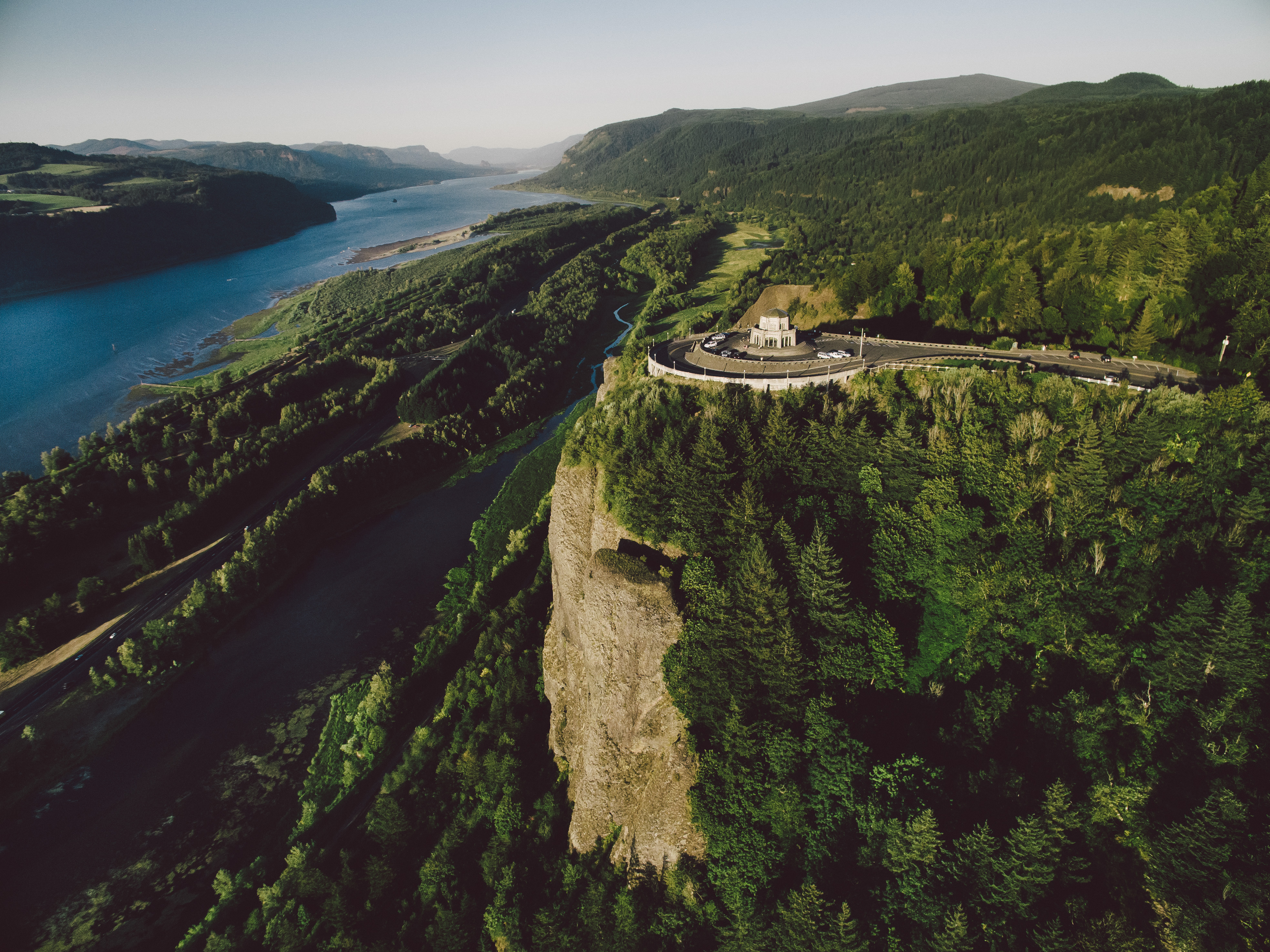
Vista House and Columbia River Gorge

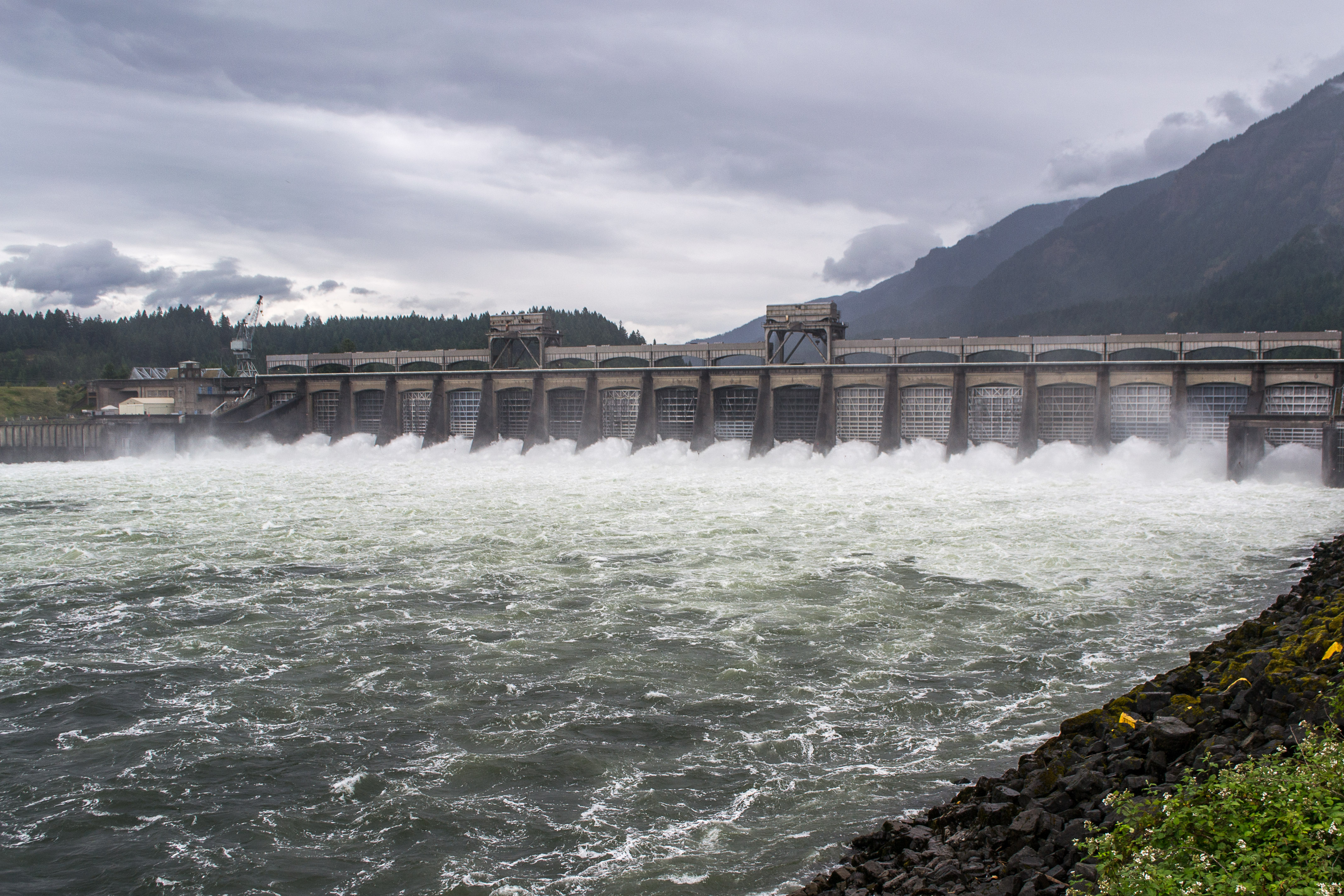
Bonneville Dam

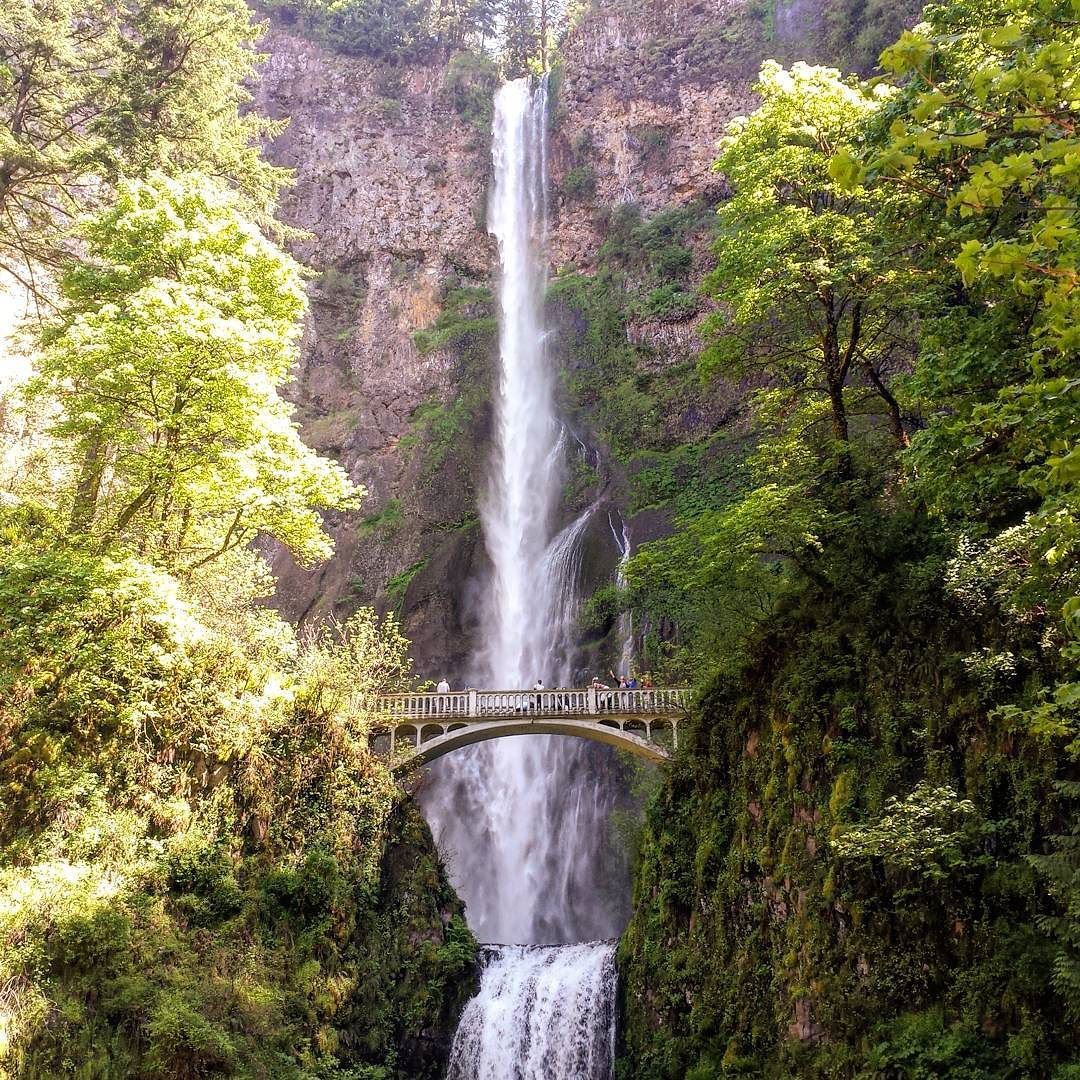
Multnomah Falls

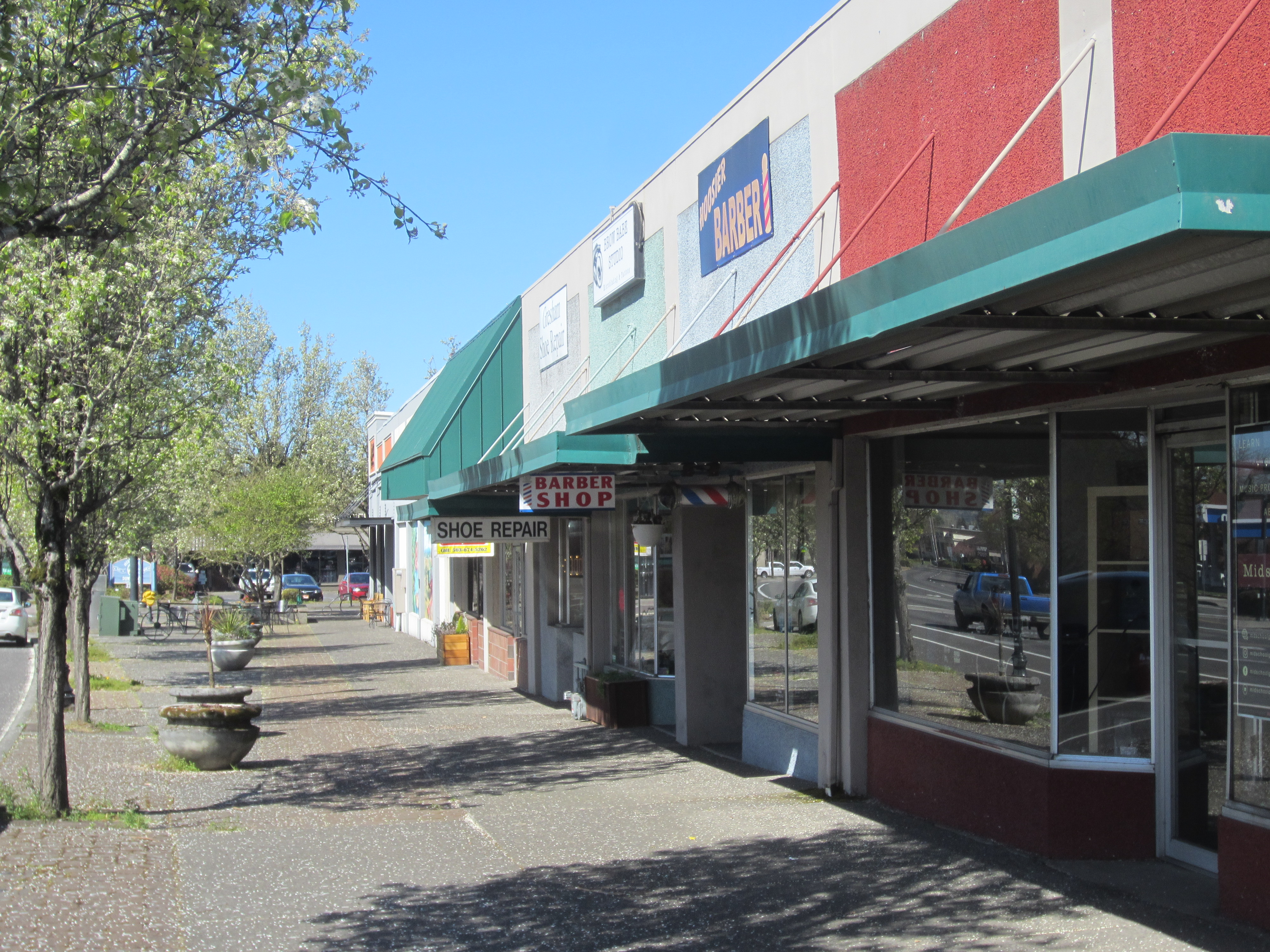
Downtown Gresham

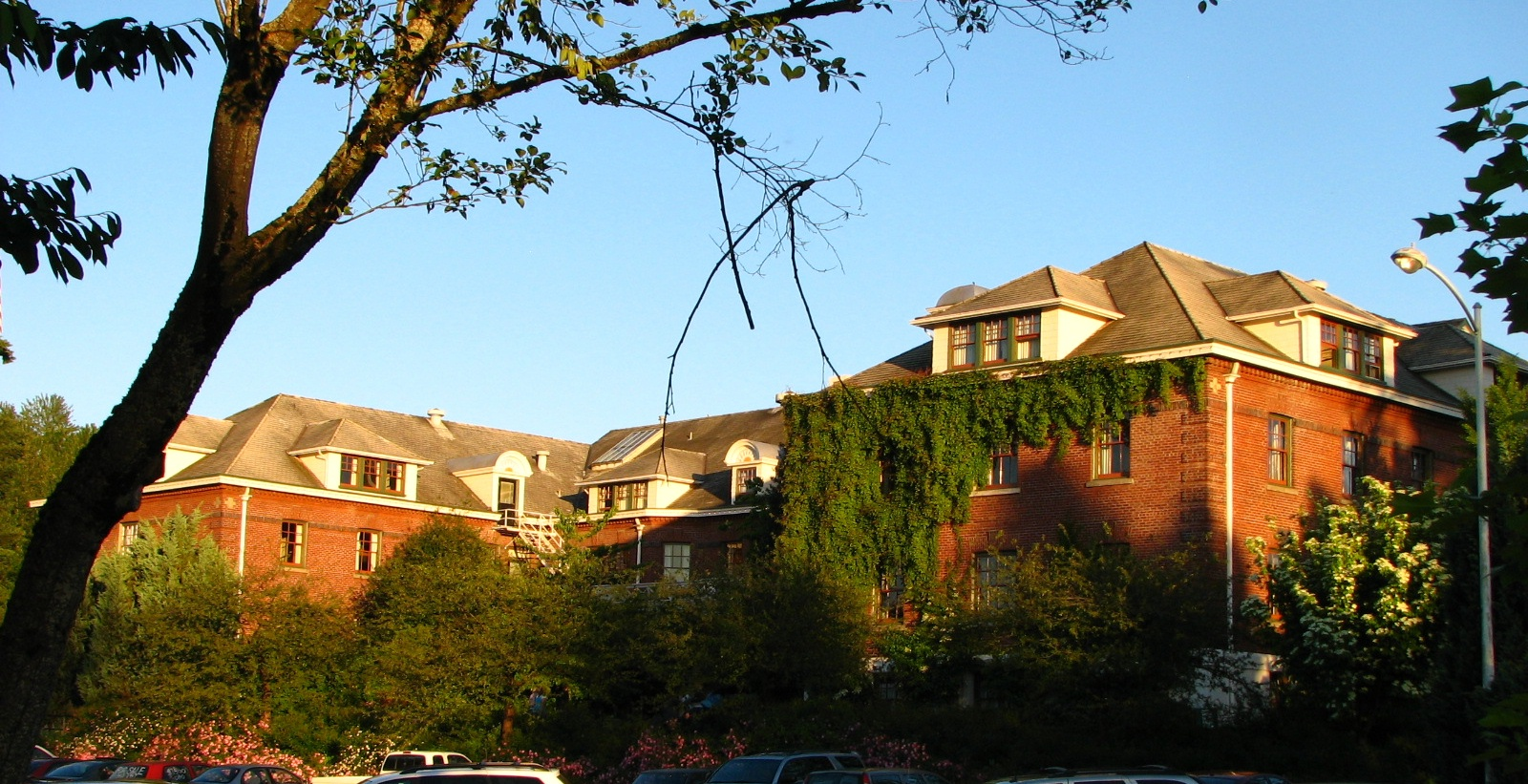
McMenamins Edgefield

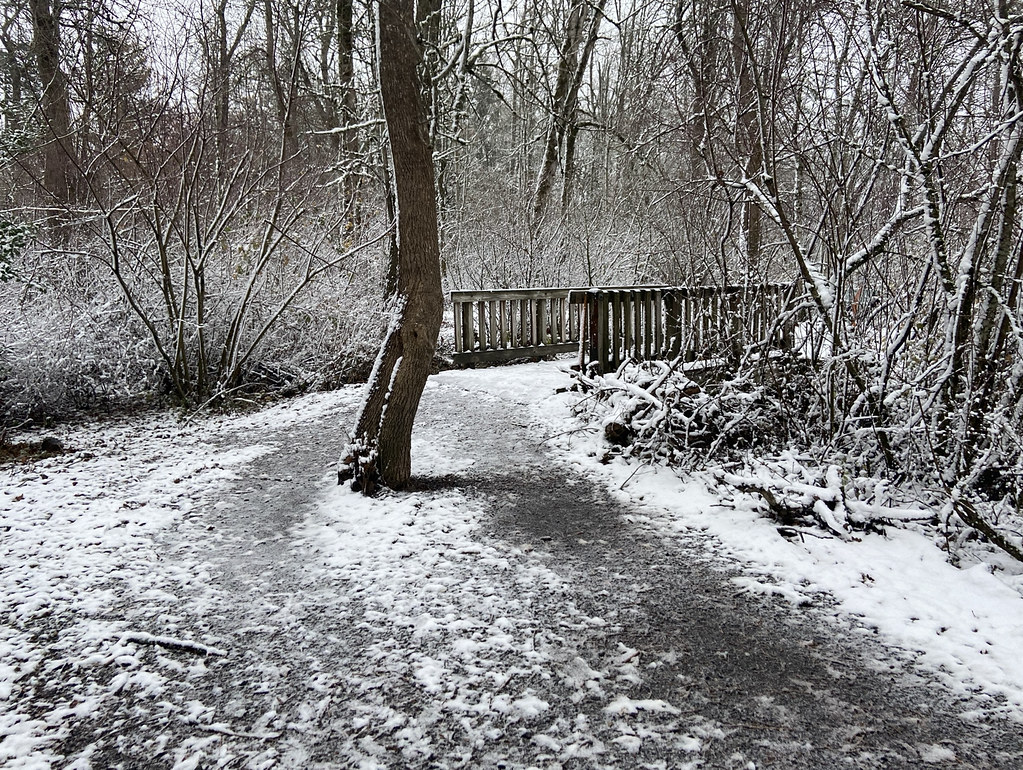
Salish Ponds Park
