= Bishopcroft =

Historic house in Portland, Oregon

- Bishopcroft of the Episcopal Diocese of Oregon
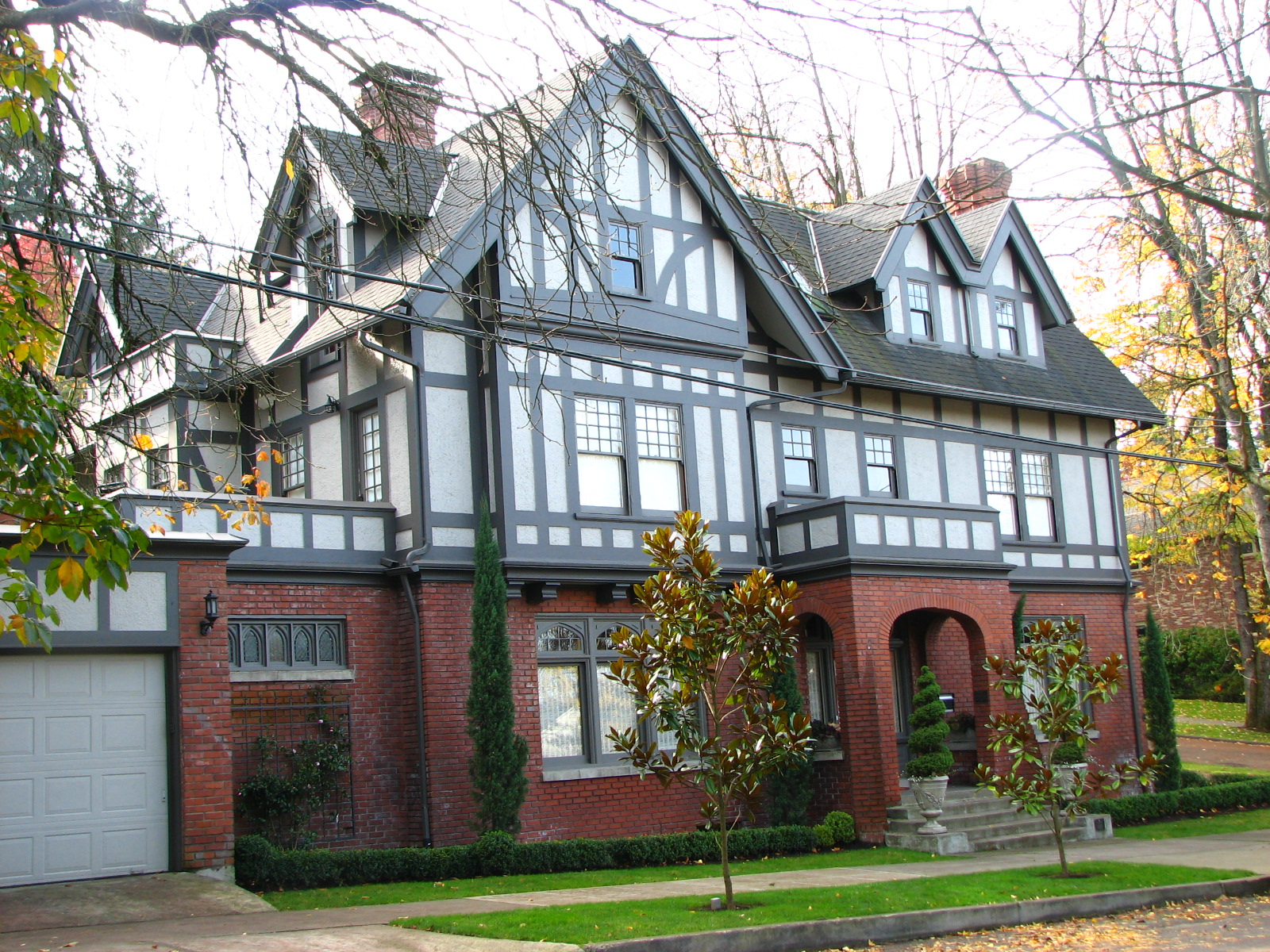
- Front of house in 2008
- Location: 1832 SW Elm Street; Portland, Oregon
- Coordinates: 45°30′34.3″N 122°41′51.8″W
- Built: 1911
- Architect: David C. Lewis
- Architectural style: Tudor Revival
- Added to NRHP: 18 May 2000

Bishopcroft is a historic house located in the Southwest Hills neighborhood of Portland, in the US state of Oregon. It is listed on the National Register of Historic Places. The house was built in 1911 for the Episcopal Diocese of Oregon as a residence and headquarters. Designed by David C. Lewis, the Tudor Revival home once contained a private chapel, a ballroom, and a wine cellar.

== History ==
The current structure known as Bishopcroft was constructed at Elm Street and 19th Avenue in Portland in 1911 with David C. Lewis as its architect. It was constructed as the residence for Charles Scadding, the then-Episcopal Church Bishop of Oregon, after Ascension Episcopal Chapel had been moved to an adjacent lot in the "prestigious" Portland Heights (now Southwest Hills) neighborhood the same year.

The Portland Heights Bishopcroft was not the first episcopal residence known as "Bishopcroft" in Portland. The older Bishopcroft had served as Bishop Benjamin Wistar Morris's residence until his death in 1906. Towards the end of his episcopate, Morris's advanced age had proved a problem and the old Bishopcroft was in disrepair upon his passing.

In 1910, Scadding commissioned Lewis to construct the new Bishopcroft on the former site of Ascension. After it was completed in 1911, The Oregon Daily Journal called it "the finest clergyman's home in the city" featuring a library, study, and chapel, and noted that it cost roughly $15,000 to build. According to the article, in addition to serving as the residence for the bishop and his family, Bishopcroft was also intended to host visiting clergymen. Bishop Scadding died at home at Bishopcroft on May 27, 1914.

After Walter Taylor Sumner replaced Scadding upon the latter's death, the old Bishopcroft was modified to serve as a home for members of the Anglican Sisters of St. John the Baptist after a 1914 fire destroyed their school at St. Helen's Hall, with Sumner to take residence at the new Bishopcroft in 1915. Bishop and Mrs. Sumner entertained many visiting clergy and hosted many dinner parties at Bishopcroft. In September 1922, they hosted what newspapers called "possibly the outstanding social event of the convention" during the 47th triennial gathering of Episcopal Church delegates representing nearly every county in every American state, and many from abroad.

Bishopcroft remained an episcopal residence until it was sold in 1939. It was entered into the National Register of Historic Places (NRHP) in 2000.

== Design ==
The structure is a Tudor Revival house with an exterior of brick with scored stucco and half timbering siding. Some qualities of Bishopcroft, including its semi-elliptical arched entry porch, have been identified as distinctively Tudor Revival in character. There have been several renovations to the structure since 1939, including the addition of a garage and deletion of a closet and a pantry on the second floor.

Bishopcroft was originally constructed with a ballroom, a grand staircase, and a private chapel adjoining the bishop's office; the chapel's altar has since been removed and the ballroom converted to an entertainment space with a home theater. When it was added to the NRHP, it had four bedrooms on the second floor and two on the third.
