= Itty =

Itty may refer to:

- Itty Achudan, a 17th-century Ayurvedic physician
- Itty E, a United States Navy patrol vessel
- Johncy Itty, former bishop of the Episcopal Diocese of Oregon
- Itty, a small alien creature that accompanied Green Lantern in the Bronze Age
