= Dr. K. A. J. and Cora Mackenzie House =

Historic building in Portland, Oregon, U.S.

- U.S. National Register of Historic Places
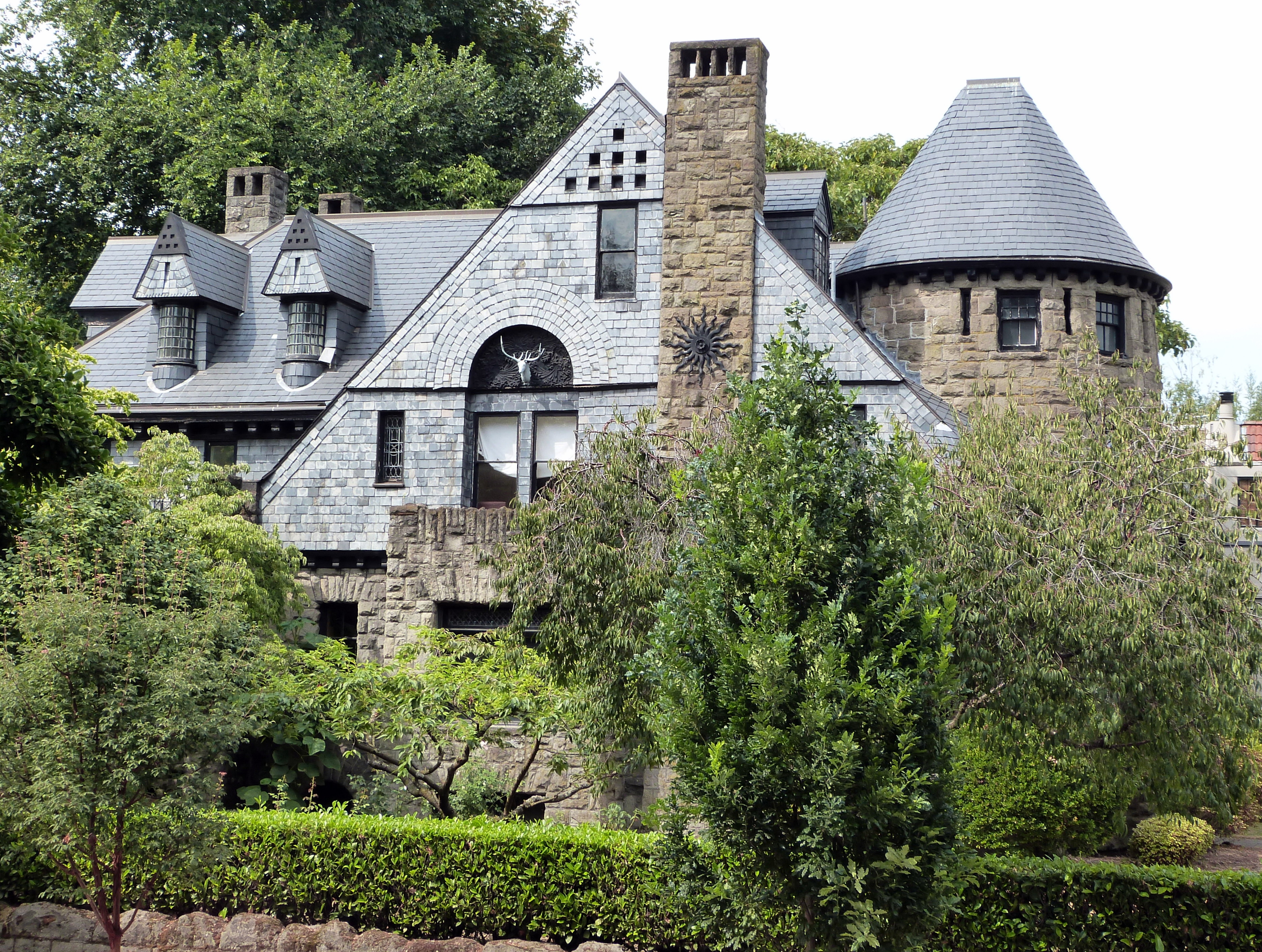
- Location: 615 NW 20th Ave., Portland, Oregon
- Coordinates: 45°31′38″N 122°41′29″W
- Area: 0.5 acres (0.20 ha)
- Built: 1892
- Architect: McCaw & Martin
- Architectural style: Richardsonian Romanesque, Shingle Style
- NRHP reference No.: 96000625
- Added to NRHP: May 31, 1996

The K.A.J. and Cora Mackenzie House is a Richardsonian Romanesque revival style building in Northwest Portland, Oregon, situated on the corner of NW 20th Avenue and NW Hoyt Street, just blocks from its partner organization, the William Temple Thrift Store. Although the house is most well-known now for its association with the William Temple community, it was originally commissioned in 1891 by Kenneth A. J. Mackenzie, a medical professional in Oregon, and his wife, Cora Mackenzie, as their private residence. The Portland architecture firm of McCaw, Martin, and White was selected by the MacKenzies to design the house. The Mackenzies owned the house and resided in it until Kenneth A. J. Mackenzie's death in 1920, when it was sold. The house has had several owners since then, eventually being placed on the National Register of Historic Places in 1996. The house has three stories and is roughly 7,100 square feet. The Mackenzie house is a prominent example of the influence of the Richardsonian Romanesque Revival architectural style on the west coast.

== Style ==
Originating in Europe during the Early or High Middle Ages, Romanesque architecture was popular in medieval Europe until the development of the Gothic architectural style. The original Romanesque style incorporated aspects of ancient Roman and Byzantine architecture as well as local traditions and rounded arches were characteristic of the style. In medieval Europe, Romanesque style was largely used in the building of churches which came with the growth of monasticism.

Richardsonian Romanesque Revival was introduced by architect Henry Hobson Richardson and is said to be a distinctly American version of the Romanesque Revival architectural style. McCaw, Martin, and White Architects designed many of the Romanesque-style buildings in Oregon, the Mackenzie House being a prime example. The Mackenzie House is a three-story, roughly 7,100 square foot house constructed of stone, from its heavy masonry facades to its slate roof. Many characteristics of the Richardsonian Romanesque style are found in the design of the house, including the three-story tower on the east side and an array of porches, terraces, and bay and oriel windows. The exterior stonework of the Mackenzie House is done in sandstone, quarried at the Tenino Quarry near Olympia, Washington. Tenino sandstone was also used in other iconic historic buildings around the Portland area, Pittock Mansion and Trinity Episcopal Church being primary examples. However, the Mackenzie House was the first residential building to be made entirely of stone.

The semi-circle arches around the porch and the rounded tops of many of the windows call back to the medieval Romanesque style while the shingle styled gable ties into the Richardsonian Romanesque Revival. In addition to the clear influence of Richardsonian Romanesque in the design of the house, there are also small exterior details that give a nod to Kenneth Mackenzie's Scottish heritage such as the life-size stage head on the south facade and the images of Scottish thistle carved into the front door.

The interior of the Mackenzie house aligns with the style and level of detail of the exterior of the structure. The floor of the entryway contains a tile mosaic while the main rooms contain hardwood floors and hand-carved wood detailing on the walls and ceilings. Characteristic of the designs of Henry Hobson Richardson, the Mackenzie house contains several inglenooks with arched entryways and fireplaces surrounded by hand-painted mosaic and carved wood. In several locations inside the house, carvings and stained glass windows continue the Scottish thistle motif first seen from the exterior.

== History ==
Kenneth A. J. Mackenzie was a physician who gained his medical education from McGill University and the Royal Infirmary of Edinburgh, finally settling down in Portland, Oregon in 1883. He was a prominent figure in Oregon, known for his achievements during his medical career such as being president of the Oregon State Medical Society and dean of the University of Oregon Medical School. The Mackenzie house is not only a product of Richardsonian Romanesque design, but of the region's craftsmanship. The house was designed by McCaw, Martin, and White Architects, a notable firm in Portland during the end of the 19th-century, and constructed in 1892. McCaw, Martin, and White designed many of the Richardsonian Romanesque structures in Portland, such as the Portland Armory Annex and the West Hall of University of Portland, and incorporated local materials and talent. The Mackenzie house was registered in the National Register of Historical Places on May 31, 1996.
