= Reynolds High School (Oregon) =

Public school in Troutdale, Oregon, United States

Location
- 1698 SW Cherry Park Road; Troutdale, (Multnomah County), Oregon 97060; United States; 45.52887°N 122.401637°W

Information
- Type: Public
- Opened: 1957
- School district: Reynolds School District
- Principal: Michael Anderson
- Teaching staff: 119.17 (FTE)
- Grades: 9-12
- Enrollment: 2,385 (2024-2025)
- Student to teacher ratio: 20.01
- Colors: Forest green, silver and white
- Athletics conference: OSAA Mt. Hood Conference 6A-4
- Mascot: Raiders
- Rival: David Douglas High School
- Newspaper: The Reveille
- Feeder schools: Lee Middle School; Reynolds Middle School; Walt Morey Middle School
- Website: www.reynolds.k12.or.us/rhs

Reynolds High School (RHS) is the only public high school in Troutdale, Oregon, United States, in the northeastern part of the Portland metropolitan area. It is part of the Reynolds School District, and is the second-largest high school in Oregon.

== History ==
The school takes its name from the school district, which was named for the Reynolds Aluminum plant in the city that closed in 2000.

On May 29, 1979, a three-alarm fire injured three students and damaged the gym and theater.

Reynolds High School merged with Columbia High School in 1989. Columbia High School is now the site of Reynolds High School, and the former Reynolds High School is now one of three middle schools in the district, Reynolds Middle School.

=== 2014 shooting ===
On June 10, 2014, an active shooter situation occurred at the school during morning period. One student, 14-year-old freshman Emilio Hoffman, was killed. A physical education teacher suffered non-life-threatening injuries. The shooter, 15-year-old Jared Michael Padgett, who was using a Daniel Defense DDM4 AR-15–style rifle and also equipped with a .25-caliber Colt handgun and a knife, engaged a responding officer in a gunfight before retreating inside a school bathroom, where he fatally shot himself. SWAT and FBI agents secured the school. The students were evacuated and were released to their parents at a nearby Fred Meyer store. The shooting occurred on the second-to-last day of the school year.

== Academics ==
In 2008, 64% of the school's seniors received a high school diploma. Of 611 students, 388 graduated, 130 dropped out, 39 received a modified diploma, and 54 were still in high school the following year.

In 2009, there were nearly 900 freshmen in the incoming class, a record for the school. This was combined with a 25% layoff of teachers, over 40 teachers at the school. This caused class sizes to increase.

== Notable alumni ==
- Diego Hernandez, Oregon State Representative, District 47
- Drew Eubanks, New York Knicks center and power forward
- David James Duncan, author of The River Why, My Story As Told By Water, The Brothers K
- Matt Wand, Oregon State Representative, District 49
