= Nick Kahl (politician) =

American politician

Nicholas Kahl
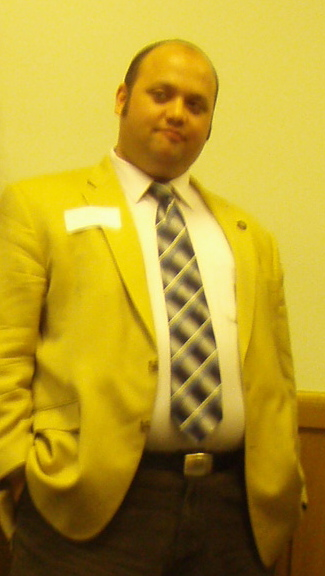

Member of the Oregon House of Representatives from the 49th district
- In office 2009–2011
- Preceded by: Karen Minnis
- Succeeded by: Matt Wand

Personal details
- Born: April 11, 1977 (age 49) Portland, Oregon
- Party: Democratic
- Spouse: Jenny Smith

Nicholas Kahl is an attorney and Democratic politician from Oregon. He served in the Oregon House of Representatives from 2009 to 2011. He is a practicing lawyer in Portland, Oregon.

== Early life and education ==
Kahl was born in East Multnomah County, Oregon and raised in Portland, Oregon. He graduated from David Douglas High School and attended Mt. Hood Community College. He graduated from Portland State University in 2000 with a Bachelor of Music in Jazz Studies.

At the time of his election to the Oregon Legislature, he was a second-year student at Lewis & Clark Law School. He graduated with a Juris Doctor in 2009.

== Political career ==
Kahl worked as staff assistant for Multnomah County Commissioner chair Jeff Cogen.

In the 2008 Oregon legislative elections, he was elected to the Oregon House of Representatives representing District 49 in Multnomah County, specifically the cities of Fairview, Troutdale, Wood Village, and a portion of Gresham. Kahl was the East Portland representative and transportation committee co-chair.

He ran for re-election in 2010 but was defeated by Republican Matt Wand.

== Legal career ==
Kahl is a trial lawyer and owns a law practice in Portland, Oregon. His litigation practice focuses on catastrophic injury, toxic torts, race discrimination, consumer protection, class actions, and other complex litigation. He represents consumers, injured people, and small business owners.

Nick Kahl is an adjunct law professor at Lewis and Clark Law School.

== Electoral history ==
2008 Oregon State Representative, 49th district
Party	Candidate	Votes	%
Democratic	Nick Kahl	11,726	56.0
Republican	John Nelse]	9,093	43.5
Write-in		106	0.5
Total votes		20,925	100%

2010 Oregon State Representative, 49th district
Party	Candidate	Votes	%
Republican	Matthew Wand	8,967	53.1
Democratic	Nick Kahl	7,857	46.5
Write-in		74	0.4
Total votes		16,898	100%
