= Zach Hudson =

American politician

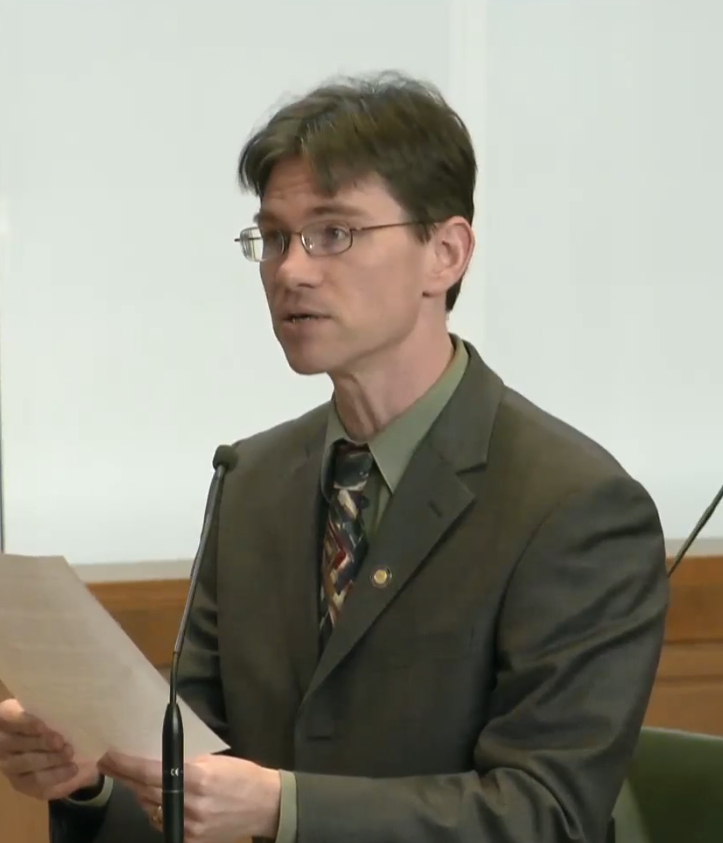

Member of the Oregon House of Representatives from the 49th district
- Incumbent
- Assumed office January 11, 2021
- Preceded by: Chris Gorsek

Personal details
- Born: Oregon, U.S.
- Party: Democratic
- Education: University of Winchester (BA, MA); Portland State University (MEd)
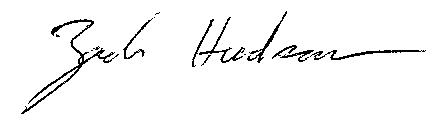
- Signature

Zach Hudson is an American educator and politician serving as a member of the Oregon House of Representatives from the 49th district. Elected in 2020, he assumed office on January 11, 2021.

== Early life and education ==
Hudson was born and raised in Oregon. He earned a Bachelor of Arts and Master of Arts from the University of Winchester in Hampshire, England. He then earned a Master of Education from Portland State University. He received teaching credentials and certificates from California State University, Fullerton and Lewis & Clark College.

== Career ==
In 2004 and 2005, Hudson worked as an English teacher at Gresham High School. From 2005 to 2009, he was an English, math, and special education teacher at the Corbett School. From 2009 to 2014, he was an adjunct professor at ITT Technical Institute in Portland, Oregon. From 2009 to 2015, he was also an adjunct professor of reading and academic development skills at Mt. Hood Community College. From 2014 until he stepped down in 2021 to join the legislature, he was a special education teacher at Reynolds High School in Troutdale, Oregon. He served on the Troutdale City Council from 2017 to 2020.

In November 2019, Hudson announced his candidacy for the 49th district in the Oregon House of Representatives. Hudson did not face an opponent in the Democratic primary and defeated Republican nominee Greg Johnson in the November general election.

== Political positions ==
In January 2025, Hudson introduced legislation to ban the commercial farming of octopuses in Oregon, following the passage of laws the previous year banning octopus farming in Washington and California. Hudson claimed that farming octopuses is unethical, citing animal rights and environmental concerns.

== Electoral history ==
2020 Oregon State Representative, 49th district
Party	Candidate	Votes	%
Democratic	Zach Hudson	16,091	57.3
Republican	Greg Johnson	11,912	42.4
Write-in		97	0.3
Total votes		28,100	100%

2022 Oregon State Representative, 49th district
Party	Candidate	Votes	%
Democratic	Zach Hudson	10,955	52.1
Republican	Randy E Lauer	10,052	47.8
Write-in		27	0.1
Total votes		21,034	100%

2024 Oregon State Representative, 49th district
Party	Candidate	Votes	%
Democratic	Zach Hudson	13,784	55.8
Republican	Terry A Tipsord	10,838	43.9
Write-in		71	0.3
Total votes		24,693	100%
