= Oregon's 49th House district =

Legislative districts in the state of Oregon

Oregon's 49th House district after redistricting after the 2020 Census

District 49 of the Oregon House of Representatives is one of 60 House legislative districts in the state of Oregon. As of 2023, the district is contained entirely within Multnomah County and includes the cities of Fairview, Wood Village, and Troutdale as well as a portion of north Gresham.

The current representative for the district is Democrat Zach Hudson of Troutdale.

== Election results ==
District boundaries have changed over time. Therefore, representatives before 2021 may not represent the same constituency as today. General election results from 2000 to present are as follows:

Year	Candidate	Party	Percent	Opponent	Party	Percent	Opponent	Party	Percent	Write-ins
2000	Carl Wilson	Republican	70.89%	Dave Toler	Independent	29.11%	No third candidate			
2002 (Note: Karen Minnis was the incumbent in this election. She previously represented District 20, but was moved to this district due to redistricting following the 2000 United States census.)	Karen Minnis	Republican	60.24%	Pamela Spradling	Democratic	39.26%	No third candidate			0.50%
2004	Karen Minnis	Republican	53.52%	Rob Brading	Democratic	46.48%	No third candidate			
2006	Karen Minnis	Republican	51.80%	Rob Brading	Democratic	47.64%	No third candidate			0.55%
2008	Nick Kahl	Democratic	56.04%	John Nelsen	Republican	43.46%	No third candidate			0.51%
2010	Matthew Wand	Republican	53.39%	Nick Kahl	Democratic	46.61%	No third candidate			
2012	Chris Gorsek	Democratic	54.22%	Matthew Wand	Republican	45.43%	No third candidate			0.35%
2014	Chris Gorsek	Democratic	60.39%	Bill Beckers	Republican	38.93%	No third candidate			0.68%
2016	Chris Gorsek	Democratic	96.51%	Unopposed						3.49%
2018	Chris Gorsek	Democratic	51.25%	Justin Hwang	Republican	44.82%	Heather Ricks	Libertarian	3.83%	0.10%
2020	Zach Hudson	Democratic	57.26%	Greg Johnson	Republican	42.39%	No third candidate			0.35%
2022	Zach Hudson	Democratic	52.08%	Randy Lauer	Republican	47.79%	No third candidate			0.13%
2024	Zach Hudson	Democratic	55.8%	Terry A Tipsord	Republican	43.9%	No third candidate			0.3%

== See also ==
- Oregon Legislative Assembly
- Oregon House of Representatives
