= Matt Wand =

Member of the Oregon House of Representatives

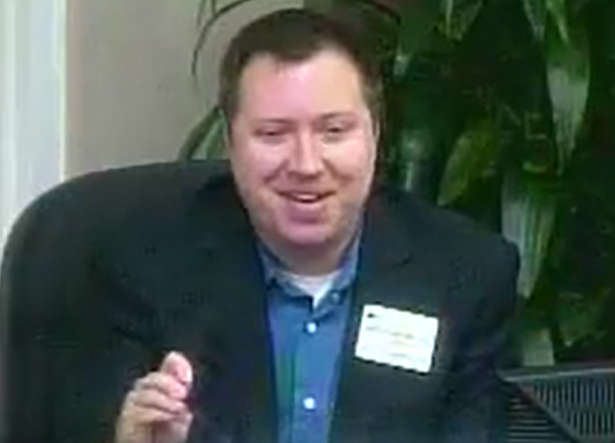
- Wand in 2012

Member of the Oregon House of Representatives from the 49th district
- In office January 10, 2011 – January 14, 2013
- Preceded by: Nick Kahl
- Succeeded by: Chris Gorsek

Member of the Troutdale City Council
- In office 2008–2011

Personal details
- Born: Gresham, Oregon
- Party: Republican
- Spouse: Anne
- Children: 3
- Education: Portland State University
- Matt Wand's voice Wand speaking at a debate before the 2012 Oregon House of Representatives election Recorded October 23, 2012

Matthew A. Wand is an American attorney and Republican politician who was a member of the Oregon House of Representatives from 2011 until 2013. He represented the 49th District which covers all or part of the cities of Troutdale, Gresham, Fairview, and Wood Village. Prior to his term in the legislature, he served on the Troutdale City Council from 2008 until 2011.

Wand was elected to the legislature in 2010, defeating incumbent Democrat Nick Kahl, receiving 8,967 votes (53%) to Kahl's 7,857 votes (47%). He was defeated in his bid for reelection in 2012, receiving 9,602 votes (46%) to Chris Gorsek's 11,459 votes (54%).

Wand was criticized in 2012 for operating a Twitter account in which he followed several Playboy Playmates as well as other female actors and models. He then proceeded to take the account down.

== Electoral history ==
2010 Oregon State Representative, 49th district
Party	Candidate	Votes	%
Republican	Matthew Wand	8,967	53.1
Democratic	Nick Kahl	7,857	46.5
Write-in		74	0.4
Total votes		16,898	100%

2012 Oregon State Representative, 49th district
Party	Candidate	Votes	%
Democratic	Chris Gorsek	11,459	54.2
Republican	Matthew Wand	9,602	45.4
Write-in		75	0.4
Total votes		21,136	100%

== See also ==
- 76th Oregon Legislative Assembly
