= Nick Kahl =

Nick Kahl may refer to:

- Nick Kahl (politician)
- Nick Kahl (baseball)
