= Diana Akiyama =

American Episcopal bishop and academic

The Right Reverend Diana Akiyama
- Bishop of Oregon
- Church: Episcopal Church
- Diocese: Oregon
- Elected: August 29, 2020
- Predecessor: Michael Joseph Hanley
- Previous posts: Vicar, St. Augustine's Episcopal Church, Kapaau, Hawaiʻi (2015–2020) Rector, Dean, Waiolaihui'ia School for Formation, Episcopal Diocese of Hawaiʻi (2014–2020)

Orders
- Ordination: 1989 by Rustin R. Kimsey
- Consecration: January 30, 2021 by Gretchen Rehberg

Personal details
- Born: Wheeler, Oregon, US
- Denomination: Anglican
- Spouse: Michael L. Jackson
- Education: University of Oregon

Diana Dorothy Akiyama is the eleventh and current bishop of the Episcopal Diocese of Oregon. She was elected on August 29, 2020, in the first all-online election in the Episcopal Church. This was due to COVID-19. She was one of four candidates for the office. At the time of her election she was vicar of St. Augustine's Episcopal Church in Kapaau, Hawaiʻi, and dean of the Episcopal Diocese of Hawaiʻi's Waiolaihui'ia School for Formation. She was ordained to the priesthood in 1988 in the Diocese of Eastern Oregon. She is the first Japanese-American woman to become an Episcopal priest. She was consecrated on January 30, 2021, at Trinity Episcopal Cathedral in Portland and is the first Asian-American woman to become an Episcopal bishop.

She was raised in Hood River, Oregon, and graduated from the University of Oregon and the Church Divinity School of the Pacific. She earned the Ph.D. in religion and social ethics from the University of Southern California in 2001. After ordination she served as associate dean of the chapel at Stanford University from 1988 until 1995. She is married to Michael L. Jackson, vice president for student affairs at the USC Rossier School of Education.
