= Charles Scadding =

Canadian/US Episcopal Church cleric (1861–1914)

The Right Reverend Charles Scadding
- Bishop of Oregon
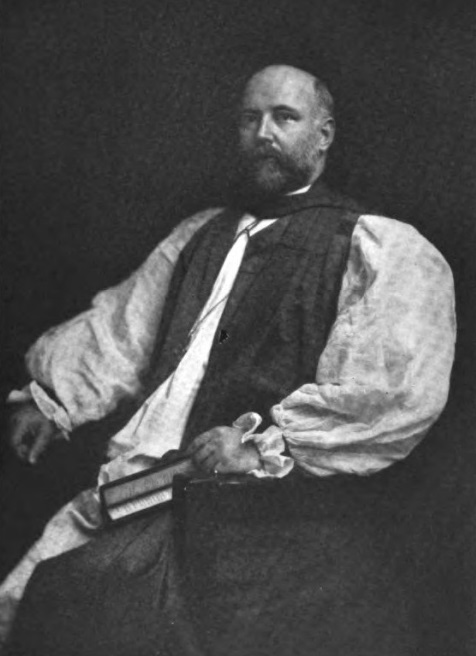
- Church: Episcopal Church
- See: Oregon
- Elected: June 14, 1906
- In office: 1906-1914
- Predecessor: Benjamin Wistar Morris
- Successor: Walter Taylor Sumner

Orders
- Ordination: July 26, 1885 (deacon); July 18, 1886 (priest) by Arthur Sweatman
- Consecration: September 29, 1906 by Daniel S. Tuttle

Personal details
- Born: November 25, 1861 Toronto, Ontario, Canada
- Died: May 27, 1914 (aged 52) Portland, Oregon, United States
- Buried: River View Cemetery
- Denomination: Anglican
- Parents: Henry Simcoe Scadding & Elizabeth Winder Wedd
- Spouse: Nellie Davy Donaldson (m. 1888; died 1894) Mary R. Pomeroy (m. 1896)
- Education: Trinity College, Toronto

Charles Scadding (November 25, 1861 – May 27, 1914) was a Canadian-born American Episcopal Church cleric who served as the third bishop of the Episcopal Diocese of Oregon from 1906 to 1914.

== Early life and education ==
Scadding was born in Toronto, Ontario in 1861 to Henry Simcoe Scadding and Elizabeth Winder Wedd. He attended Trinity College, Toronto, graduating with a Bachelor of Arts in 1885.

== Ordained ministry ==
He was ordained deacon on July 26, 1885, and to the priesthood on July 18, 1886, by Bishop Arthur Sweatman of Toronto. As a deacon he served at St John's Church in Buffalo, New York. In 1886 he became assistant rector at St George's Church in Manhattan, remaining there until 1890. He then served as rector in Christ Church in Middletown, New York, and Trinity Church in Toledo, Ohio. Scadding was also a lecturer for the London Society for the Propagation of the Gospel.

== Family ==
On July 11, 1888, Scadding married Nellie Davy Donaldson. She died on November 12, 1894. On May 12, 1896, he married Mary Robinson Pomeroy.

== Bishop ==
On September 29, 1906, Scadding was consecrated Bishop of Oregon. Scadding replaced Benjamin Wistar Morris, who had passed that same year. Morris's old age at the end of his episcopate had led to issues in the diocese. Scadding found the episcopal residence in disrepair and, 1910, commissioned a new home. Both the old residence and the 1911-built structure were known as Bishopcroft.

== Death ==
Scadding died of pneumonia on March 29, 1914, in Portland, Oregon.
