= Fairview Woods Park =

Park in Fairview, Oregon, U.S.

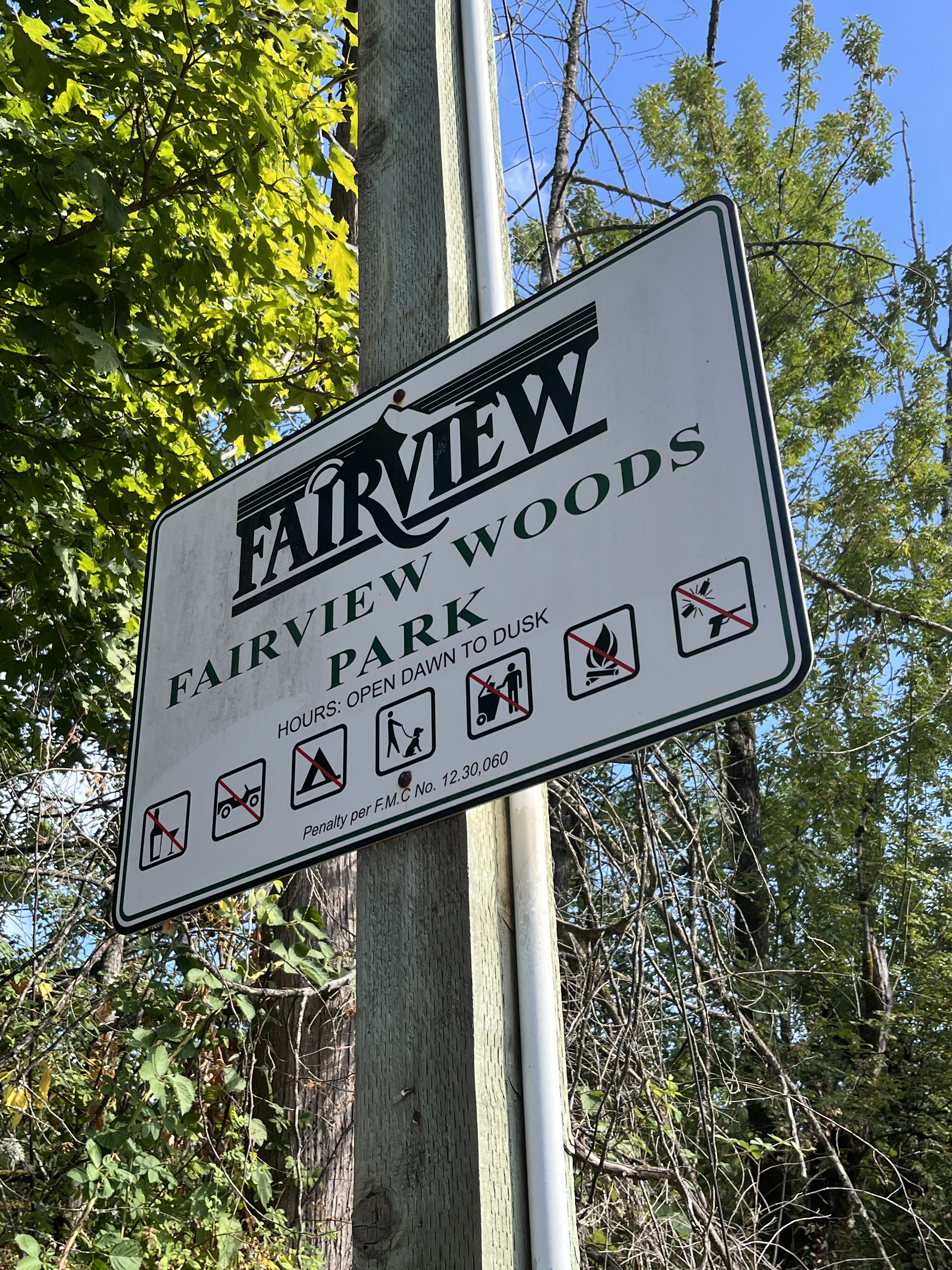
- Park sign, 2022
- Interactive map of Fairview Woods Park
- Location: Fairview, Oregon, U.S.
- Coordinates: 45°32′18″N 122°25′29″W

Fairview Woods Park (also known as Fairview Woods Wetland Park or Fairview Woods Wetlands Park) is an 8-acre (3.2 ha) public park in Fairview, Oregon, United States.
