= Donald L. Robertson Park =

Park in Wood Village, Oregon, U.S.

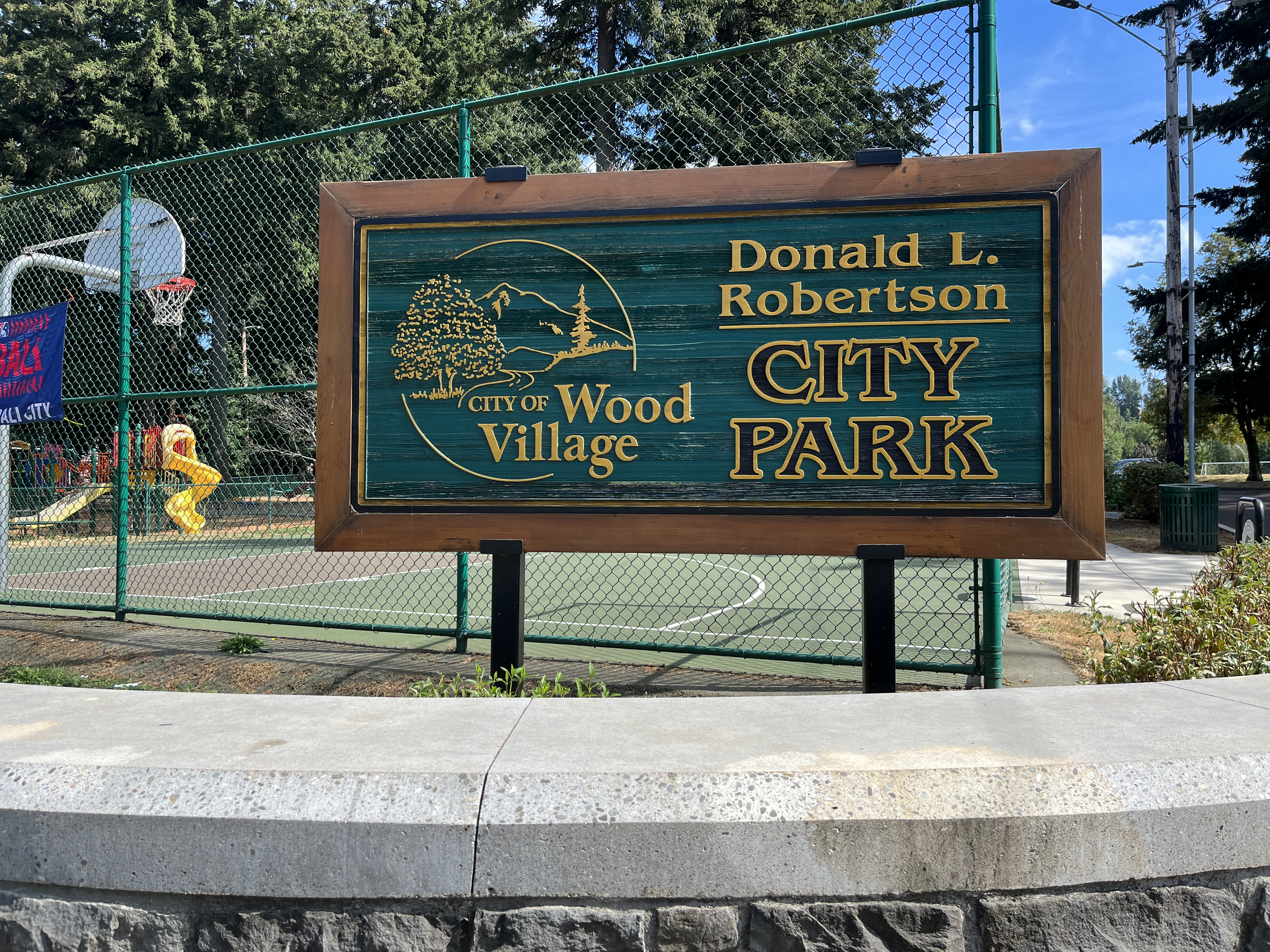
- Park sign, 2022
- Interactive map of Donald L. Robertson Park
- Location: Wood Village, Oregon, U.S.
- Coordinates: 45°32′12″N 122°24′46″W

Donald L. Robertson Park is a public park in Wood Village, Oregon, United States. The park has a playground, an arboretum, a basketball court, and a wetland area.
