= Chris Gorsek =

American politician

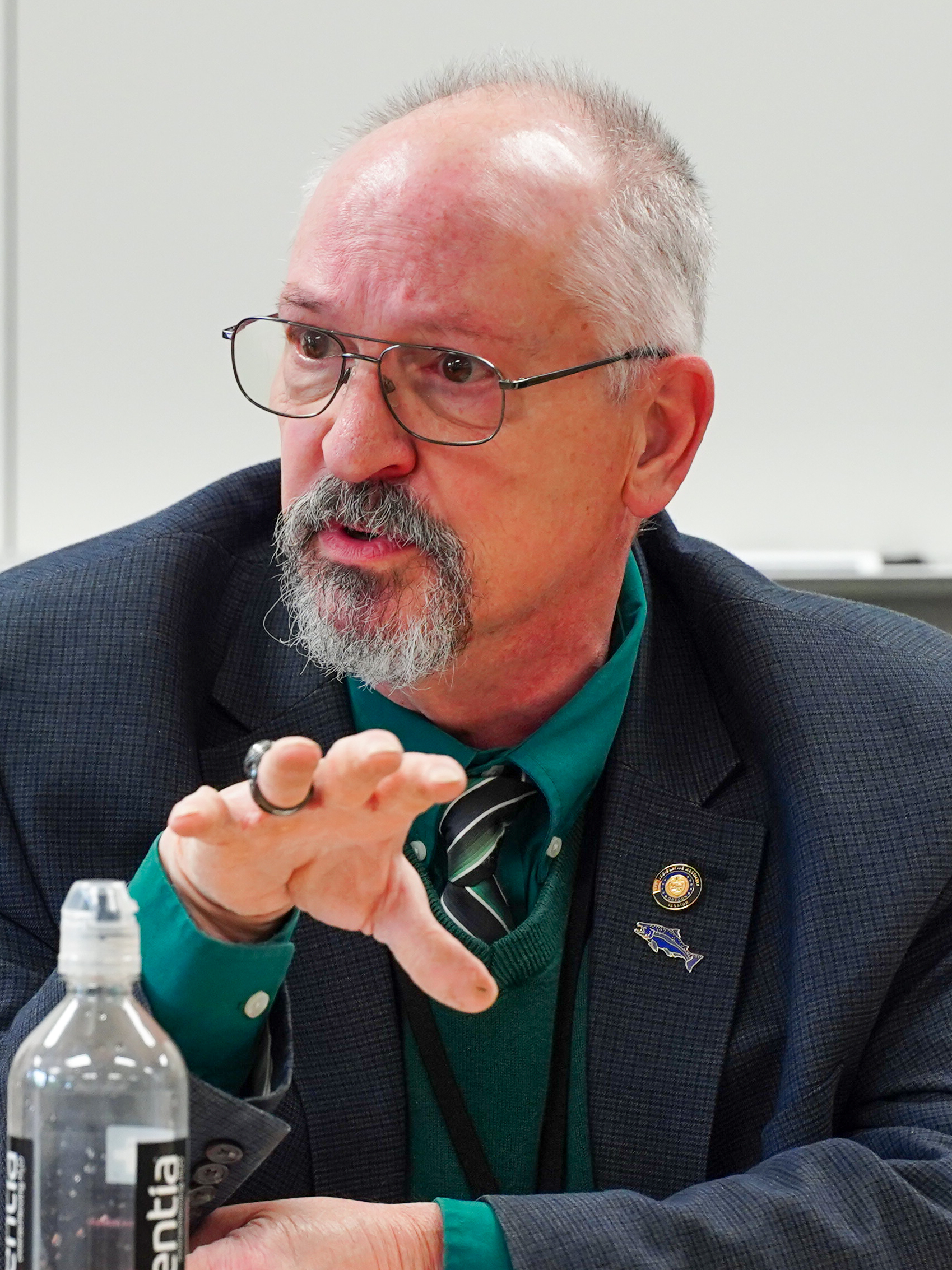

Member of the Oregon State Senate from the 25th district
- Incumbent
- Assumed office January 11, 2021
- Preceded by: Laurie Monnes Anderson

Member of the Oregon House of Representatives from the 49th district
- In office January 14, 2013 – January 11, 2021
- Preceded by: Matt Wand
- Succeeded by: Zach Hudson

Member of the Troutdale City Council, Position 1
- In office January 1, 2003 – December 31, 2006
- Preceded by: Pat Smith
- Succeeded by: Jim Kight

Personal details
- Born: January 28, 1958 (age 68) Portland, Oregon, U.S.
- Party: Democratic
- Education: Portland Community College (AA); University of Oregon (BA, MA); Portland State University (PhD)
- Profession: Politician; educator
- Website: Official website Campaign website
- Chris Gorsek's voice Gorsek speaking about the 77th Oregon Legislative Assembly; Recorded July 31, 2013

Christopher S. Gorsek (born January 28, 1958) is an American politician, educator, and former police officer serving as a member of the Oregon State Senate from the 25th district in East Multnomah County since 2021. A member of the Democratic Party, he represented the 49th district in the Oregon House of Representatives from 2013 to 2021 and previously served on the Troutdale City Council.

== Early life and education ==
Gorsek was born in Portland, Oregon. He grew up in Southeast Portland and graduated from Franklin High School in 1976. He attended Portland Community College, where he received an associates degree. He later received a bachelor of science and master of arts from the University of Oregon in 1989 and 1992, respectively, followed by a Ph.D. from Portland State University in 2004.

== Career ==
From 1977 to 1980, he served as a cadet, and later reserve officer, with the Portland Police Bureau, and from 1980 to 1987 served as a full-time sworn police officer.

Since 1997, he has been a professor at Mt. Hood Community College teaching criminal justice and geography.

=== Troutdale City Council ===
Gorsek was elected to Position 1 on the Troutdale City Council in November 2002, defeating incumbent Pat Smith and challenger Gail P. Thurber. He took office in January 2023 and served one term, through 2006.

=== Oregon House of Representatives ===
In 2012, Gorsek challenged first-term Republican incumbent Matt Wand in House District 49 in east Multnomah County. Gorsek was unopposed in the primary and won the general election with 54.2% of the vote. He was reelected in 2014, 2016, and 2018. He represented the district until January 2021, when Zach Hudson succeeded him.

In the House, Gorsek served as vice chair of the Transportation and Economic Development Committee during the 2013 and 2015 sessions, and as vice chair of the Transportation Policy Committee in 2017.

Gorsek sponsored legislation on juvenile interrogations with Representative Carla Piluso. House Bill 3242 (2017) required police to electronically record custodial interviews of people under 18 in law enforcement facilities in connection with acts that would be felonies if committed by an adult. House Bill 3261 (2019) expanded the requirement to recording custodial interviews of young people whenever appropriate equipment is available.

=== Oregon Senate ===
In 2019, Gorsek announced a run for the open Senate District 25 seat after longtime Democratic incumbent Laurie Monnes Anderson chose not to seek reelection. He defeated Republican Justin Hwang and took office in January 2021. Gorsek was reelected in 2021.

In 2021, Gorsek was a chief sponsor of Senate Bill 803, introduced at the request of Multnomah County District Attorney Mike Schmidt, which restricted scrap metal businesses from buying catalytic converters unless sellers could prove ownership. KGW reported that thefts remained at 2021 levels after the law took effect, while Willamette Week reported in 2023 that Gresham police were seeing an 80% decline in thefts that year.

In 2021, Gorsek was chief sponsor of Senate Bill 418, which prohibits law enforcement from knowingly communicating false facts about evidence or making unauthorized statements about leniency when interrogating people under 18.

In 2023, Gorsek joined Representatives Zach Hudson and Ricki Ruiz in asking the Oregon Health Authority to reject Legacy Health's request to close the birth center at Legacy Mount Hood Medical Center in Gresham.

In 2024, Gorsek was chief sponsor of Senate Bill 1595, the Family Financial Protection Act, which increased the amounts protected from garnishment and seizure in debt collection, including exempting $2,500 in a debtor's accounts at one financial institution, and amended the state's unlawful debt collection practices law.

As co-chair of the Joint Committee on Transportation Reinvestment, Gorsek helped write House Bill 2025, a transportation funding package that would have raised nearly $14.6 billion over ten years, but failed in June 2025.

On June 20, 2025, during a Joint Committee on Transportation Reinvestment hearing on House Bill 2025, Gorsek interrupted Representative Shelly Boshart Davis, a Republican committee member, after she called the transportation package "grossly irresponsible." Boshart Davis filed a conduct complaint under legislative workplace rules alleging that Gorsek berated her and treated her differently because she is a woman, and Republican legislators called for his censure and removal from the committee. On June 23, Gorsek offered to resign as co-chair, saying he wanted the committee to stay focused on the bill. Senate President Rob Wagner removed Gorsek and himself from the committee and named Khanh Pham co-chair. An independent investigator retained by the Legislative Equity Office found that Gorsek's conduct "reasonably shocked, embarrassed and intimidated" Boshart Davis but did not constitute discrimination. In 2026, a Senate conduct committee found that Gorsek had not engaged in harassment or discrimination but had violated respectful-workplace policies, and recommended a facilitated conversation between the two.

In September 2025, the Senate twice postponed a floor vote on Governor Tina Kotek's $4.3 billion transportation package because Gorsek was unable to attend and Democrats needed all 18 of their members to raise taxes without Republican votes.

== Personal life ==
Gorsek resides in Troutdale, Oregon with his wife. They have two children. From 1991 to 1995 he served on the Ministry in Higher Education Board for the Episcopal Diocese of Western Oregon and twice served on the University of Oregon Episcopal Campus Ministry Board.

== Electoral history ==
2012 Oregon State Representative, 49th district
Party	Candidate	Votes	%
Democratic	Chris Gorsek	11,459	54.2
Republican	Matthew Wand	9,602	45.4
Write-in		75	0.4
Total votes		21,136	100%

2014 Oregon State Representative, 49th district
Party	Candidate	Votes	%
Democratic	Chris Gorsek	9,527	60.4
Republican	Bill Beckers	6,141	38.9
Write-in		107	0.7
Total votes		15,775	100%

2016 Oregon State Representative, 49th district
Party	Candidate	Votes	%
Democratic	Chris Gorsek	16,076	96.5
Write-in		582	3.5
Total votes		16,658	100%

2018 Oregon State Representative, 49th district
Party	Candidate	Votes	%
Democratic	Chris Gorsek	11,045	51.3
Republican	Justin Hwang	9,658	44.8
Libertarian	Heather Ricks	826	3.8
Write-in		21	0.1
Total votes		21,550	100%

2020 Oregon State Senator, 25th district
Party	Candidate	Votes	%
Democratic	Chris Gorsek	30,206	51.9
Republican	Justin Hwang	27,882	47.9
Write-in		76	0.1
Total votes		58,164	100%

2024 Oregon State Senator, 25th district
Party	Candidate	Votes	%
Democratic	Chris Gorsek	29,253	55.9
Republican	Raymond E Love	22,936	43.8
Write-in		130	0.2
Total votes		52,319	100%
