= Walter Taylor Sumner =

The Right Reverend Walter Taylor Sumner
- Bishop of Oregon
- Church: Episcopal Church
- See: Oregon
- Elected: September 16, 1914
- In office: 1915-1935
- Predecessor: Charles Scadding
- Successor: Benjamin D. Dagwell

Orders
- Ordination: November 7, 1903 (deacon); May 29, 1904 (priest) by Charles P. Anderson
- Consecration: January 6, 1915 by Charles P. Anderson

Personal details
- Born: December 15, 1873 Manchester, New Hampshire, United States
- Died: September 4, 1935 (aged 61) Portland, Oregon, United States
- Buried: Pine Grove Cemetery, Manchester, New Hampshire
- Denomination: Anglican
- Parents: Charles D. Sumner, Orintha A. Thompson
- Spouse: Myrtle L Mitchell (m. 1918)

Walter Taylor Sumner (December 5, 1873 – September 4, 1935) was the fourth bishop of the Episcopal Diocese of Oregon from 1915 to 1935.

== Early life ==
Sumner was born in Manchester, New Hampshire, on December 15, 1873, to parents Charles D. Sumner (1844-1915) and Orintha A. Thompson (1850-1934)). He was raised a Baptist but was confirmed as an Episcopalian during college. He was educated at the public schools of Manchester, later received a bachelor's degree in science from Dartmouth College in 1898, after which he worked for the Western Electric Company. He studied for the priesthood at Western Theological Seminary and graduated in 1904. He was awarded an honorary Doctor of Divinity from Northwestern University.

== Career ==
Sumner was ordained to the diaconate on November 7, 1903, and to the priesthood on May 29, 1904, by Coadjutor Bishop Charles P. Anderson of Chicago. Sumner was in charge of St. George Mission, Grand Crossing, Illinois. By 1906 he became dean of the Cathedral of St Peter and Paul in Chicago. Sumner was elected Fourth Bishop of Oregon, on September 16, 1914, serving until his death in 1935. He was consecrated on January 6, 1915.

== Death ==
Sumner died on September 4, 1935, at the Good Samaritan Hospital in Portland, Oregon. He was buried in Manchester, New Hampshire.
