= Trinity Episcopal Cathedral (Portland, Oregon) =

Church in Portland, Oregon, U.S.

Trinity Cathedral
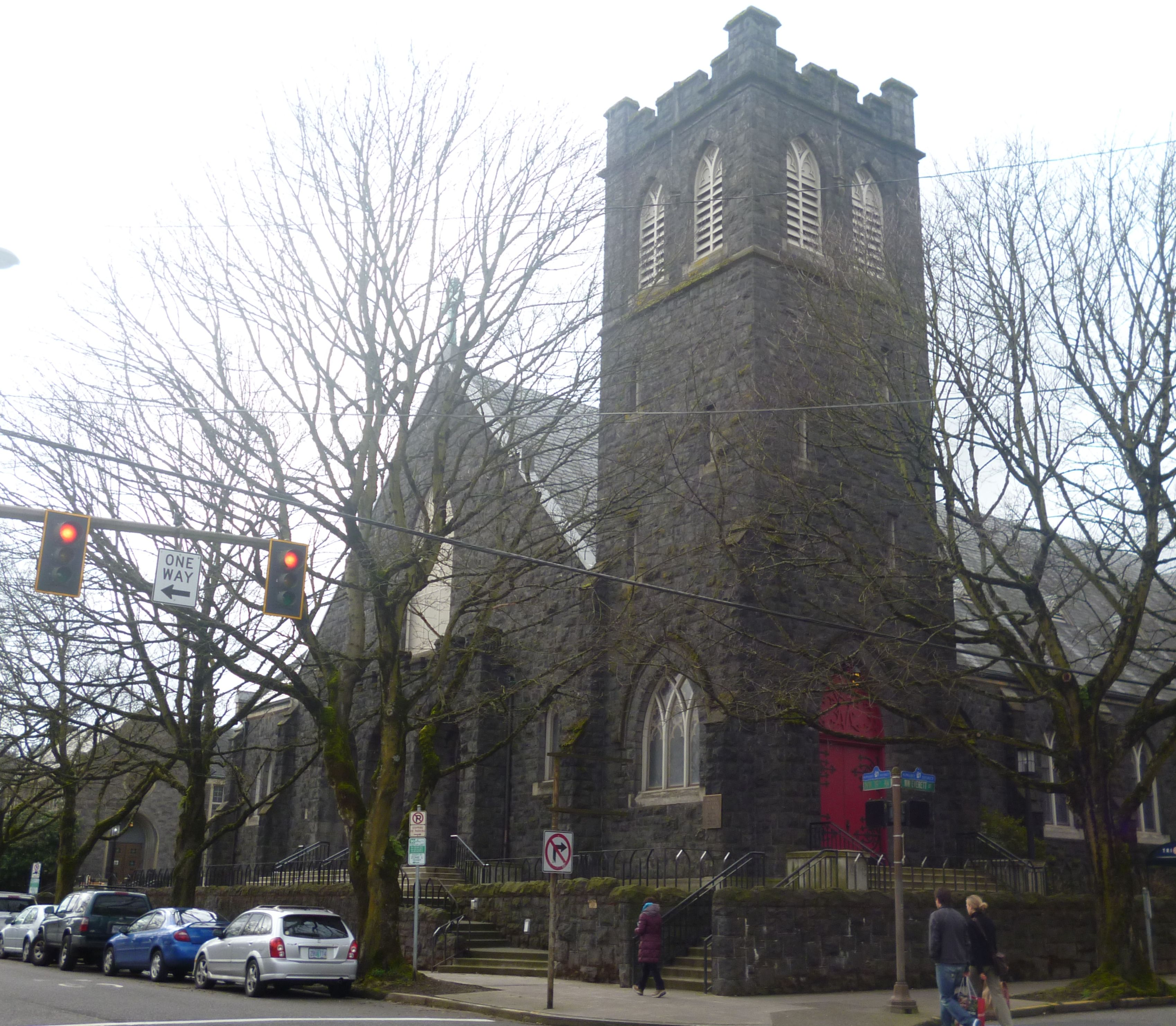
- Northern entrance featuring the bell tower at the intersection of 19th and Everett streets

- Location within Oregon
- 45°31′28.41″N 122°41′27.66″W
- Location: 147 NW 19th Ave. Portland, Oregon
- Country: United States
- Denomination: Episcopal Church in the United States of America
- Website: trinity-episcopal.org

History
- Founded: May 18, 1851; 175 years ago
- Consecrated: October 14, 1906; November 19, 1993 (as a cathedral)

Architecture
- Architectural type: Gothic Revival
- Completed: 1904

Specifications
- Materials: Basalt, Sequoia

Administration
- Diocese: Oregon

Clergy
- Bishop: Diana Akiyama
- Dean: Brendan Barnicle

Trinity Episcopal Cathedral in Portland, Oregon is a progressive Episcopal congregation and the seat of the Episcopal Diocese of Oregon of The Episcopal Church. The cathedral is located at 147 NW 19th Avenue in Portland, Oregon, in the Northwest District.

The legal name of the cathedral corporation is Trinity Episcopal Cathedral, Portland, Oregon. It was originally organized on March 18, 1873, as Trinity Episcopal Church, Portland, Oregon, and was renamed as a cathedral on February 17, 1994, after the Episcopal Bishop of Oregon relocated the diocesan seat to the current location in the previous year.

The Rt. Rev. Robert Louis Ladehoff, the Eighth Bishop of Oregon, consecrated the cathedral on November 19, 1993. Prior to 1993, the seat of the Diocese of Oregon was the then Cathedral of St. John the Baptist since 1973, which, in turn was relocated from the then St. Stephen's Cathedral.

The cathedral serves as the central parish of the Episcopal diocese whose jurisdiction includes the parts of Oregon west of the Cascade Mountains. The Very Rev. Dr. Brendan Barnicle was named Cathedral Dean in 2026.

The church reported 1,758 members in 2015 and 1,463 members in 2025. Plate and pledge income reported for the congregation in 2025 was $1,680,900. Average Sunday attendance (ASA) in 2025 was 350 persons. This was a relative decrease from ASA of 587 persons reported in 2016.

Portland Mayor Ted Wheeler, whose mother was a member, attends occasionally.

== History ==
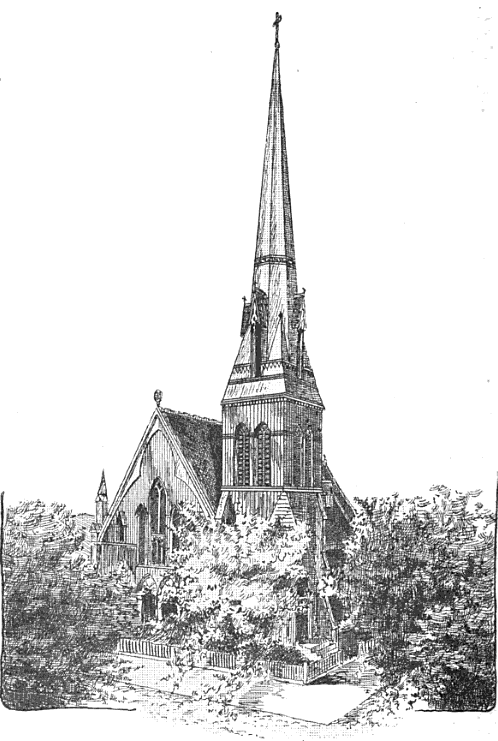
The 1872 building, which was damaged by fire in 1902.

On May 18, 1851, the Rev. St. Michael Fackler and the Rev. William Richmond along with four parishioners organized Trinity Episcopal Church in the city of Portland, Oregon, and secured permission to hold services in the newly completed school house. It was the first Episcopal congregation organized in the Oregon Territory. Fackler and Richmond went on to organize parishes in Oregon City, Champoeg, Lafayette, and Milwaukie before the year was over.

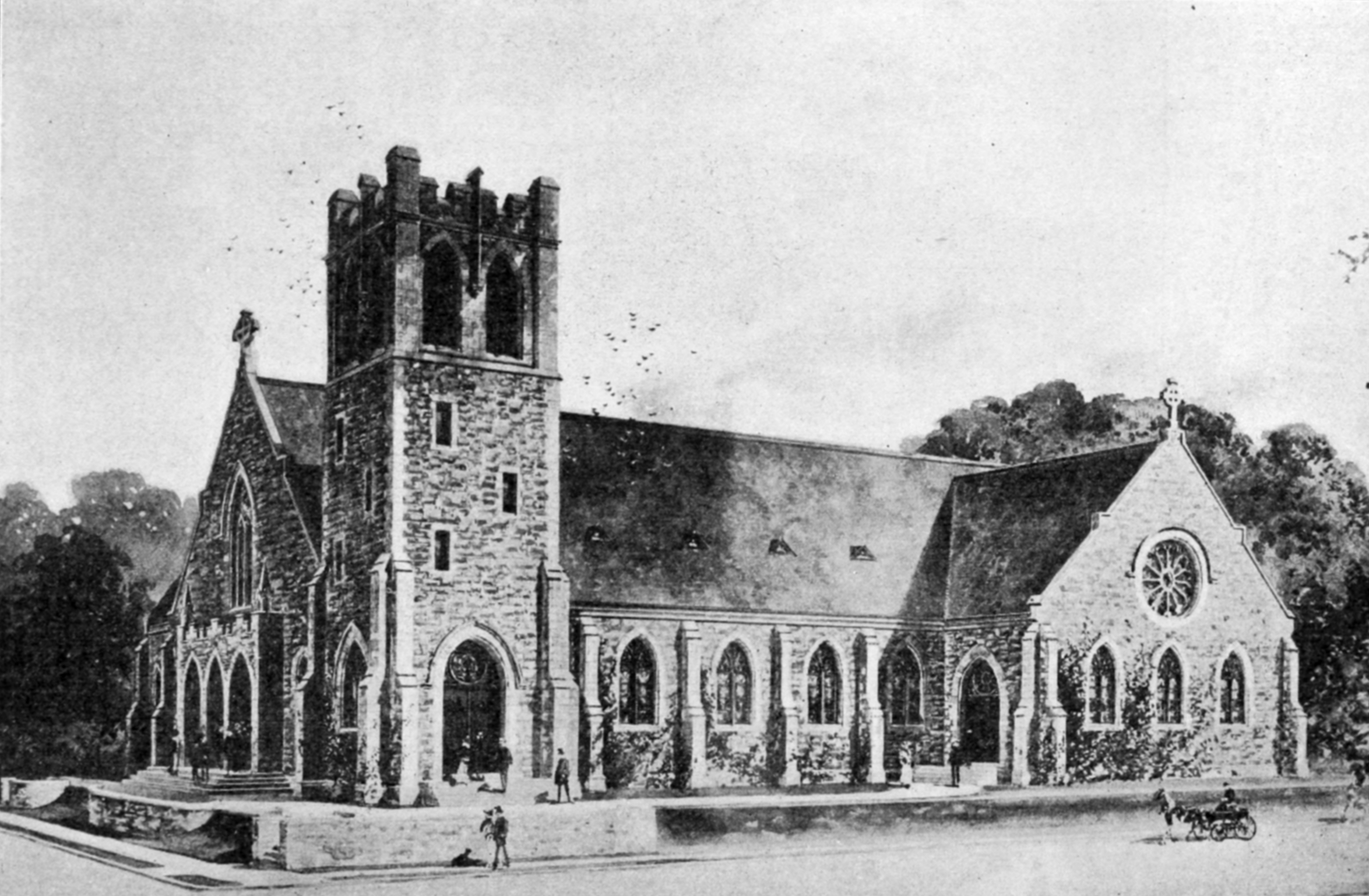
The new building just prior to its consecration in 1906

In 1853 the congregation had grown to 25 parishioners, and called its first rector, the Rev. John D. McCarty. Construction began on a permanent building, located at the corner of Southwest Second Avenue and Oak Street in Portland on land donated by parishioner Benjamin Stark, a prominent lawyer and citizen. When this building, essentially a log cabin, was consecrated by the newly elected Missionary Bishop of the vast Missionary District of the Oregon and Washington Territories, the Right Rev. Thomas Fielding Scott, it was the first Episcopal church building north of San Francisco and west of St. Paul.

Cathedral exterior at NW 19th & Everett

By 1871, Trinity had grown to over 200 members. The congregation had purchased a half block at the corner of Southwest Sixth Avenue and Oak Street for $3,000. In 1872 a new church building was built on this site that was thought to more accurately reflect the congregation's (and the City of Portland's) stature. The Vestry voted that the Chancel window of this church was to be a memorial to Bishop Thomas F. Scott. This window, which was saved when 1872 building burned, is now in the East wall of the present cathedral.

Interior of Trinity Episcopal Cathedral, Portland, Oregon

The congregation in this period included many prominent Portlanders, including Cicero Hunt Lewis, Sylvester Pennoyer, Rodney Glisan, and Matthew Deady. In 1873, Trinity was involved in the founding of Good Samaritan Hospital. In 1902, the church building at Sixth and Oak was heavily damaged by fire, and the congregation decided to relocate yet again, to the more fashionable NW 19th Avenue, where many wealthy parishioners lived. This new building, in which the congregation still worships, was consecrated on October 14, 1906. The stained glass windows, the work of the Charles J. Connick Studios of Boston, date from the late 1940s.

Rosales Organ, Opus 11 built in 1986.

In the late 1970s the Episcopal Church underwent a period of liturgical renewal, with the adoption of a new Book of Common Prayer. Under the leadership of Trinity's rector, the Reverend William H. Wagner, Jr., the Cathedral was redesigned and renovated to better reflect a new understanding of worship. The altar was moved forward, closer to the congregation, and the chancel was redesigned to allow for more flexible seating.

This redesign, completed in 1983, coincided with the building of a new organ, and Trinity hired young organ designer Manuel Rosales to begin construction on a new instrument.

In 1987, the Rosales Organ, Opus 11, was completed and has since earned acclaim as one of the finest organs in the country.

== See also ==
- Culture of Portland, Oregon
- List of cathedrals in the United States
- List of the Episcopal cathedrals of the United States
- Religion in Portland, Oregon
