= USS Itty E =

Patrol vessel of the United States Navy

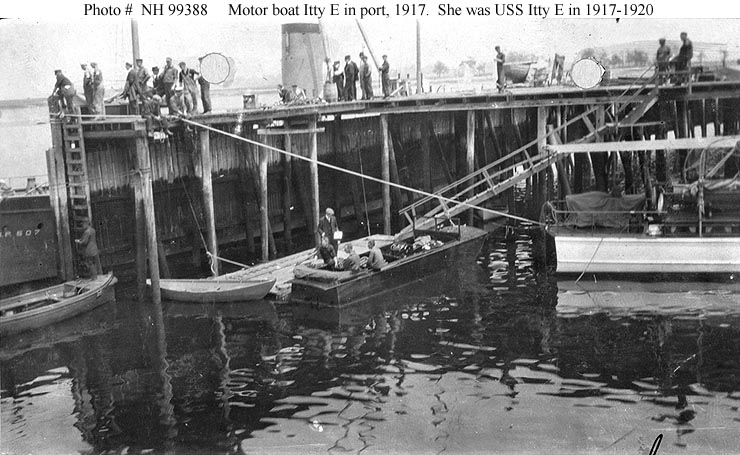
- Itty E (center, tied to a floating dock) as a private motorboat, probably around the time the United States Navy accepted her for service ca. May–July 1917. Partially visible across the pier is the patrol vessel USS Machigonne (SP-507).

History

United States
- Name: USS Itty E
- Namesake: Previous name retained
- Builder: Murray and Tregurtha, South Boston, Massachusetts
- Completed: 1916
- Acquired: 1917
- Commissioned: 6 July 1917
- Fate: Constructive total loss July 1918; scrapped 1920
- Notes: Operated as private motorboat Itty E 1916-1917

General characteristics
- Type: Patrol vessel
- Length: 25 ft (7.6 m)
- Beam: 6 ft (1.8 m)
- Draft: 1 ft 8 in (0.51 m)
- Speed: 35 knots

USS Itty E (SP-952) was a United States Navy patrol vessel in commission from 1917 to 1918.

Itty E was built as a private open motorboat of the same name in 1916 by Murray and Tregurtha at South Boston, Massachusetts. In 1917, the U.S. Navy - which had evaluated Itty E and concluded that she would be "[e]xcellent as rescue boat or tender to the airplane at Naval Air Station" - chartered her from her owner, F. H. Rawson of Chicago, Illinois, for use as a section patrol boat during World War I. She was commissioned on 6 July 1917 as USS Itty E (SP-952).

Assigned to the 1st Naval District in northern New England, Itty E operated successfully as a fast rescue boat at Naval Air Station Boston, Massachusetts. She was transferred to Norfolk, Virginia, on 20 October 1917, but saw little service there because of a need for extensive engine repairs. Her engine had been removed and was under repair in a facility ashore when it was burned in July 1918, resulting in Itty E being declared a constructive total loss. She was taken to the Washington Navy Yard in Washington, D.C., in October 1918 and scrapped there in 1920.
