= Benjamin D. Dagwell =

Benjamin Dunlop Dagwell (July 21, 1890 – June 2, 1963) was fifth bishop of the Episcopal Diocese of Oregon. He served from 1936 to 1958, and was consecrated on February 12, 1936.

== See also ==
- Historical list of bishops of the Episcopal Church in the United States of America
