= Johncy Itty =

American Episcopal bishop

Johncy Itty was ninth bishop of the Episcopal Diocese of Oregon, serving from 2003 to 2008. He was elected on May 17, 2003.

== See also ==
- List of bishops of the Episcopal Church in the United States of America
