= Salish Ponds Park =

Park in Fairview, Oregon, United States

Salish Ponds Wetland Park
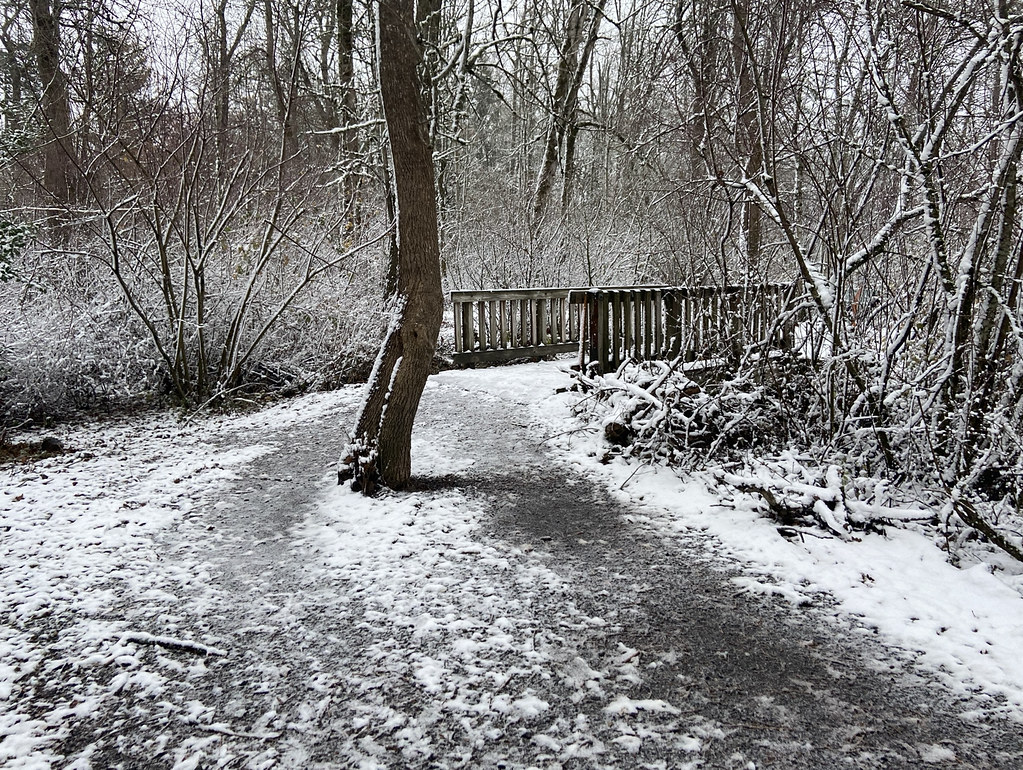
- Interactive map of Salish Ponds Wetland Park
- Location: NE Halsey Street & Fairview Parkway; Fairview, Oregon
- Coordinates: 45.530570°N 122.447384°W
- Area: 70 acres (28 ha)
- Created: 1968
- Operator: City of Fairview

Salish Ponds Park (officially Salish Ponds Wetland Park) is a 70-acre city park located in Fairview, Oregon.

== History ==
Salish Ponds Park was initially an abandoned rock quarry used for expanding Interstate 84. Mining operations ceased in the early 1980s and the owners donated the property to the City of Fairview in 1999. The city quickly redeveloped the property into a natural area, refurbishing two of the quarries into ponds and erecting hiking trails through the forest.

In July 2012, the Fairview City Council approved the "Salish Ponds Park Improvement Project" with funds from a 2006 Metro bond. This project led to the redevelopment of the pond shores which had been trampled due to man-made erosion, and redevelopment of the hiking trails to gravel.

== Recreation ==
The park contains 2.8 miles of hiking trails, one of which connects via the Alex Brown Covered Bridge to Fairview Community Park, a smaller park containing a playground, gazebo, and large lawn.

The park contains two large ponds. West Salish Pond is 6.2 acres and 42 feet deep. East Salish Pond is 11.74 acres and 18 feet deep.

=== Fishing ===
West Salish Pond contains Trout and East Salish pond has a natural population of Bass, Panfish, and Catfish. West Salish Pond is stocked by the Oregon Department of Fish and Wildlife as per the ODFW Weekly Trout Stocking Schedule . Stocking had been previously stopped at the request of the city in 2012 to switch focus of the area to a natural area as opposed to a "fishing spot".
