= Benjamin Wistar Morris (bishop) =

American bishop

The Right Reverend Benjamin Wistar Morris
- Bishop of Oregon
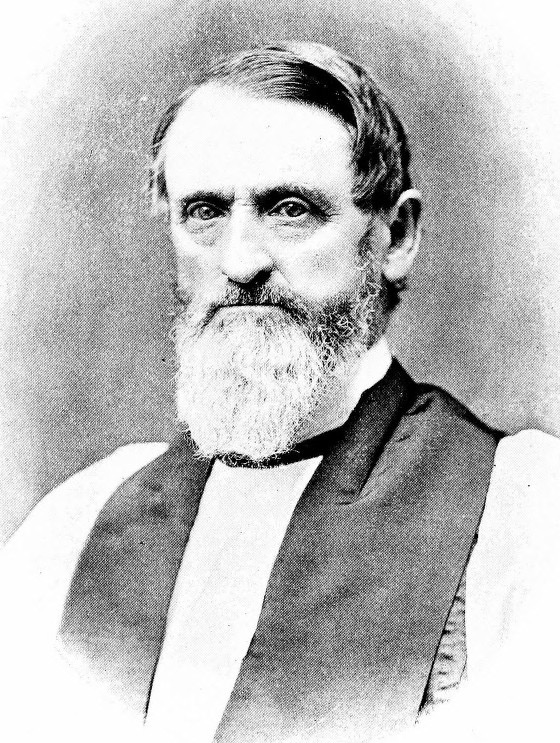
- Church: Episcopal Church
- See: Oregon
- Elected: 1868
- In office: 1868–1906
- Predecessor: Thomas Fielding Scott
- Successor: Charles Scadding

Orders
- Ordination: June 28, 1846 (deacon); April 27, 1847 (priest) by Alonzo Potter
- Consecration: December 3, 1868 by Alfred Lee

Personal details
- Born: May 30, 1819 Wellsboro, Pennsylvania, United States
- Died: April 7, 1906 (aged 86) Portland, Oregon, United States
- Buried: Lone Fir Cemetery
- Denomination: Anglican
- Parents: Samuel W. Morris
- Spouse: Hannah Rodney (m. 1856)

Benjamin Wistar Morris (sometimes II; May 30, 1819 – April 7, 1906) was the second bishop of the Episcopal Diocese of Oregon, which at the time incorporated the present-day episcopal dioceses of Olympia, Spokane, and Eastern Oregon.

== Background ==
A descendant of Anthony Morris, one of the first colonists in Pennsylvania, Morris was born in Wellsboro, Pennsylvania, which had been founded by his grandfather and namesake, the first Benjamin Wistar Morris. His father was Samuel Wells Morris, a district court judge and member of the U.S. House of Representatives. Morris graduated from General Theological Seminary in New York City in 1846, was ordained to the diaconate and subsequently to the priesthood on April 27, 1847. From 1847 to 1851 he was rector of St. Matthew's Episcopal Church in Sunbury, Pennsylvania. He subsequently served as rector of St. David's Episcopal Church, Manayunk Borough, Pennsylvania and as assistant and subsequently rector of St. Luke's Episcopal Church, Germantown, Pennsylvania. While serving at St. Luke's, Morris organized an effort to supply food, medicine, clothing, and bedding to sick and wounded troops at the Battle of Gettysburg. On December 3, 1868, he was elected as the second missionary Bishop of Oregon, following Thomas Fielding Scott, who had died the previous year.

He received the degree of S. T. D. from Columbia University in 1868, and also from the University of Pennsylvania the same year.

== Bishop of Oregon ==
Morris was consecrated December 3, 1868, in Philadelphia, Pennsylvania, and arrived in Portland, Oregon, on June 2, 1869. To reach Portland, Morris voyaged down the Atlantic coast, crossed the isthmus of Panama on foot, and boarded a ship sailing up the Pacific Coast. He went on to serve one of the longest episcopates in the history of the Episcopal Church. In 1869 he founded St. Helen's Hall Girls' School, now known as the Oregon Episcopal School. In 1875, he founded Good Samaritan Hospital in Portland at a cost of $10,000. Eighteen parishes in the current Diocese of Oregon were founded by Morris during his tenure. By 1880 the Missionary Diocese of Oregon had grown too large for one bishop, and the missionary dioceses of Olympia in Western Washington and Spokane in Eastern Washington were formed. Morris remained bishop of the missionary diocese of Oregon, which was admitted as a diocese of the Episcopal Church by the General Convention in 1889.

== Family life ==
In 1856, Morris married Hannah Rodney, daughter of the Rev'd. John Rodney, who was then rector of St. Luke's, Germantown, Pennsylvania. Their son, Benjamin W. Morris, became a noted architect, designer of the interiors on the RMS Queen Mary, the 1928 annex to the Morgan Library, and the Bank of New York Building, among other prominent projects. Bishop Morris died in Portland in 1906 and is buried in Lone Fir Cemetery in Portland.

== See also ==
- Episcopal Diocese of Oregon
- List of Bishop Succession in the Episcopal Church
