= Michael Joseph Hanley =

American Episcopal bishop (born 1954)

Michael Joseph Hanley (born November 26, 1954) is a former bishop of the Episcopal Diocese of Oregon. He was elected at the diocese's annual convention on November 30, 2009, and was ordained to the episcopate and installed on April 10, 2010.

== See also ==
- List of Episcopal bishops of the United States
- Historical list of the Episcopal bishops of the United States
