= Thomas Fielding Scott =

American bishop (1807–1867)

The Right Reverend Thomas Fielding Scott
- Bishop of Oregon and Washington
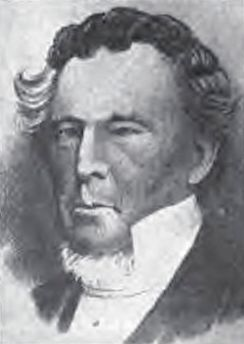
- Church: Episcopal Church
- See: Oregon & Washington
- Elected: 1853
- In office: 1854–1867
- Successor: Benjamin Wistar Morris

Orders
- Ordination: March 12, 1843 (deacon); February 24, 1844 (priest) by Stephen Elliott
- Consecration: January 8, 1854 by Stephen Elliott

Personal details
- Born: March 12, 1807 Iredell County, North Carolina, United States
- Died: July 14, 1867 (aged 60) New York City, United States]
- Denomination: Anglican ([prev. Presbyterian)
- Parents: James Scott & Rebekkah Worke
- Spouse: Evelyn Appleby (m. 1830)

Thomas Fielding Scott (March 12, 1807 – July 14, 1867) was the first missionary Episcopal Bishop of Washington and Oregon territories.

== Early life ==
Scott was born in Iredell County, North Carolina, the son of James Scott and Rebekkah Worke Scott. He attended Franklin College (later the University of Georgia), graduating in 1829. Scott was ordained deacon in 1843, and ordained priest the following year. After his ordination to the priesthood, he became rector of St. James' Church in Marietta, Georgia. He later moved to Columbus, Georgia to become rector of Trinity Church in that town, remaining there until his ordination as bishop. While there, Scott received an honorary Doctor of Divinity degree from his alma mater.

== Bishop of Washington and Oregon ==
Scott was consecrated the first missionary Bishop of Washington and Oregon territories in 1854. He was the 60th bishop in the ECUSA, and was consecrated in Christ Church in Savannah, Georgia by Bishops Stephen Elliott, Nicholas Hamner Cobbs, and Thomas F. Davis. On arriving in Oregon on April 22, 1854, Scott took possession of an acre of land in Eugene, Oregon given to him for a church building by the town's founder, Eugene Skinner. The following Sunday he held services at Trinity Church in Portland, Oregon. Given the large span of territory he only had two clergy to help, Fackler and McCarty. There were only three organized congregations and all were in Oregon. For the first six years of Bishop Scott's episcopate, McCarty was the only priest in Washington. In October 1854 Fr. McCarty was directed to Fort Steilacoom on Puget Sound. He held regular services at Nisqually and Olympia. Later he would found the first church in Washington upon settling in Vancouver with his new wife. St. Luke's parish, Vancouver, was consecrated by Bishop Scott on May 27, 1860.(Jessett 17–18).

In 1856, Scott founded a boys school in Portland, which was reorganized and renamed after him after his death. In the summer of 1857, Bishop Scott visited Victoria, British Columbia and confirmed twenty candidates as the first bishop for British Columbia would not be appointed for another two years.

He died in 1867 while visiting New York City of a fever contracted while crossing the Isthmus of Panama.

== Notes ==
- Batterson, Hermon Griswold (1878). A Sketch-book of the American Episcopate. Philadelphia: J. B. Lippencott & Co.
- Perry, William Stevens (1895). The Episcopate in America. New York: The Christian Literature Company.
- Jessett, Thomas E (1967). Pioneering God's Country: The History of the Diocese of Olympia 1853–1967.
