= Trinity Episcopal Church (Toledo, Ohio) =

Historic church in Ohio, United States

- U.S. National Register of Historic Places
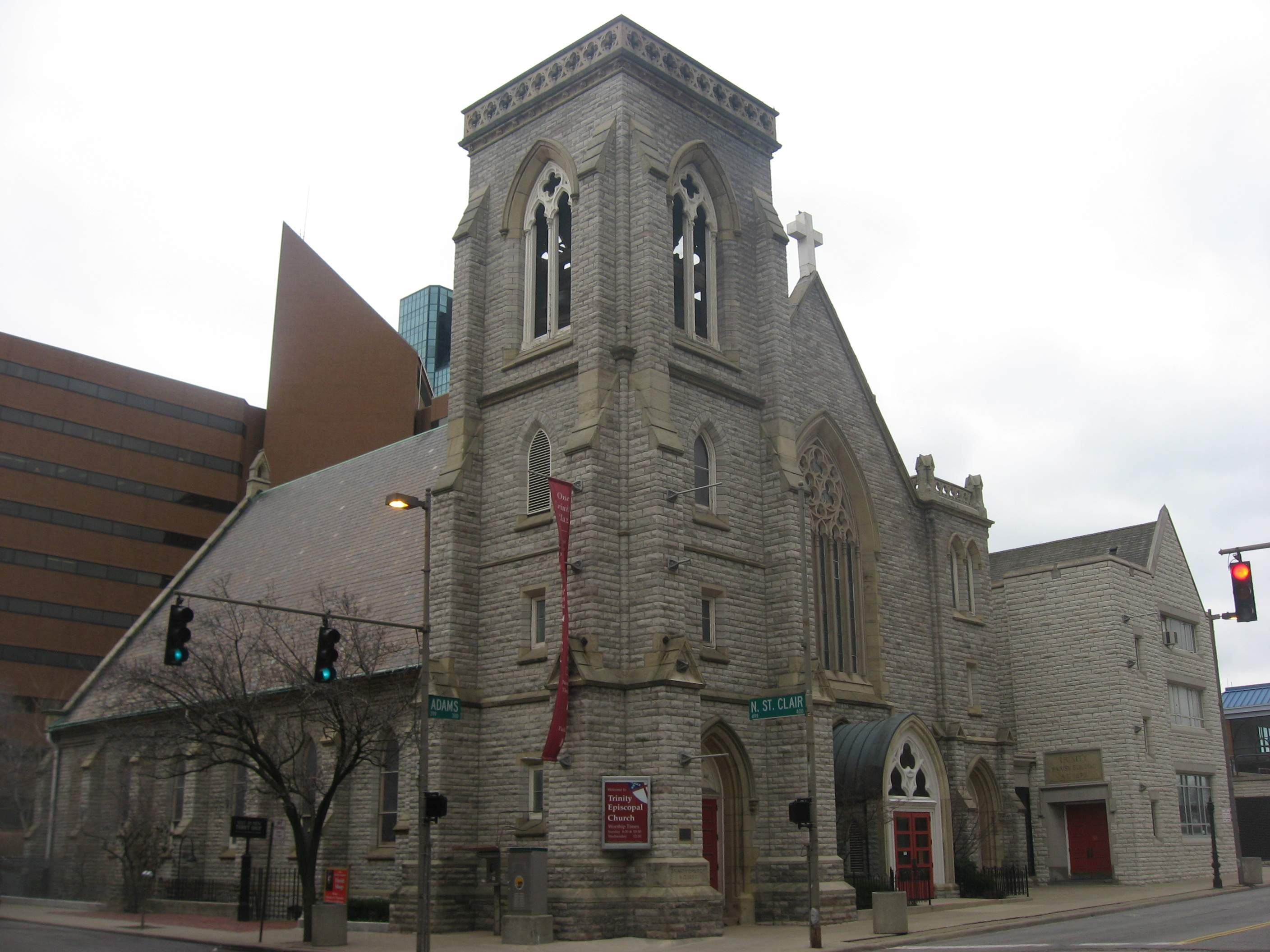
- Front and western side

- Location within Ohio Location within the United States
- Location: 316 Adams St., Toledo, Ohio
- Coordinates: 41°39′9″N 83°32′0″W
- Area: less than one acre
- Built: 1863
- Architect: Miller, C.C.
- Architectural style: Gothic Revival
- NRHP reference No.: 83004317
- Added to NRHP: December 29, 1983

Trinity Episcopal Church is a historic Episcopal church at 316 Adams Street in Toledo, Ohio. It is a parish of the Episcopal Diocese of Ohio. In 2015, the church reported 177 members; in 2025, it reported 351 members. Plate and pledge financial support reported by the church in 2025 was $240,124. Average Sunday Attendance (ASA) reported in 2025 was 99 persons. This was a relative decrease on ASA of 115 in 2020.

The church was built in 1863 in a Gothic Revival style. The building was added to the National Register in 1983. In 1910 the Skinner Organ Company installed a new pipe organ in the church that was the largest organ in Toledo.

The church's rector is the Rev. Jon M. Richardson, appointed in 2025.
