= Episcopal Diocese of Oregon =

Diocese of the Episcopal Church in the United States

Coordinates: 44°N 123°W

Diocese of Western Oregon Dioecesis Oregonensis

Location
- Country: United States
- Territory: Benton, Clackamas, Clatsop, Columbia, Coos, Curry, Douglas, Jackson, Josephine, Lane, Lincoln, Linn, Marion, Multnomah, Polk, Tillamook, Washington, Yamhill
- Ecclesiastical province: Province VIII

Statistics
- Congregations: 64 (2025)
- Members: 10,032 (2025)

Information
- Denomination: Episcopal Church
- Established: September 11, 1889
- Cathedral: Trinity Cathedral
- Language: English, Spanish

Current leadership
- Bishop: Diana Akiyama

Map
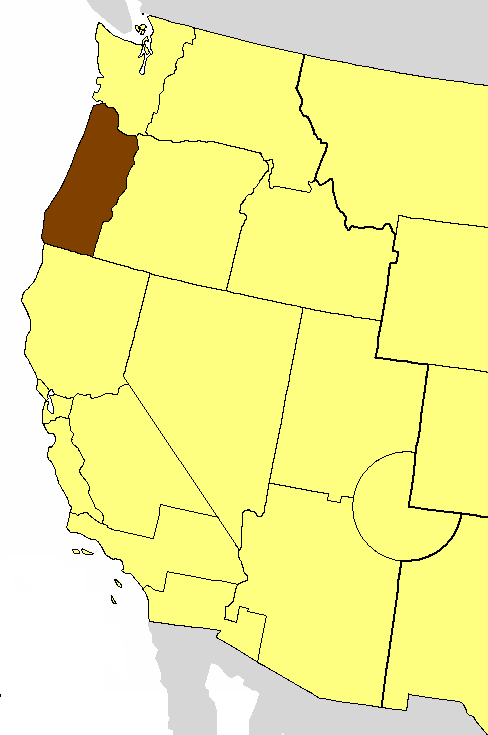
- Location of the Diocese of Oregon

Website
- ecwo.org/

The Episcopal Diocese of Western Oregon is a diocese of the Episcopal Church which consists of the western portion of the State of Oregon bordered by the Pacific Ocean, the Columbia River, the Cascade Range and the Oregon–California state line. Major cities in the diocese are Portland, Salem, Eugene and Medford. The diocese is a part of Province VIII of the Episcopal Church.

The seat of the diocese is Trinity Episcopal Cathedral, Portland, Oregon.

Michael Joseph Hanley was elected tenth bishop of the Episcopal Diocese of Oregon at the diocese's annual convention on November 30, 2009. He was ordained to the episcopate and installed on April 10, 2010.

Diana Akiyama was elected eleventh bishop of the diocese on August 28, 2020. She was consecrated on January 30, 2021, at the Trinity Episcopal Cathedral, Portland, Oregon. She is the first Japanese-American woman to be ordained a bishop in The Episcopal Church.

In 2025, the diocese reported average Sunday attendance (ASA) of 3,900 persons, a relative decline from 5,943 in 2015. It reported plate and pledge financial income of $12,991,038 for 2025. Between 2015 and 2025, reported membership declined from 15,554 to 10,032.

== Bishops of Oregon ==
	Honorific & Name	Dates
1st	Thomas Fielding Scott	1854–1867
2nd	Benjamin Wistar Morris	1868–1906
3rd	Charles Scadding	1906–1914
4th	Walter Taylor Sumner	1915–1935
5th	Benjamin Dunlop Dagwell	1936–1958
6th	James W. F. Carman	1958–1974 (Coadjutor Bishop, 1957–1958)
7th	Matthew Paul Bigliardi	1974–1985
8th	Robert Louis Ladehoff	1986–2003 (Coadjutor Bishop, 1985)
9th	Johncy Itty	2003–2008
10th	Michael Joseph Hanley	2010–2021
11th	Diana Akiyama	2021–present

== Suffragan and assisting bishops ==
- Hal Raymond Gross, Suffragan Bishop, 1965–1979
- Sandy (Sanford Zangwill Kaye) Hampton, Assisting Bishop, 2008–2010 (previously Suffragan Bishop of Minnesota 1989–1996 and Assistant Bishop of Olympia, 1996–2003)
