= Fairview, Oregon =

- City
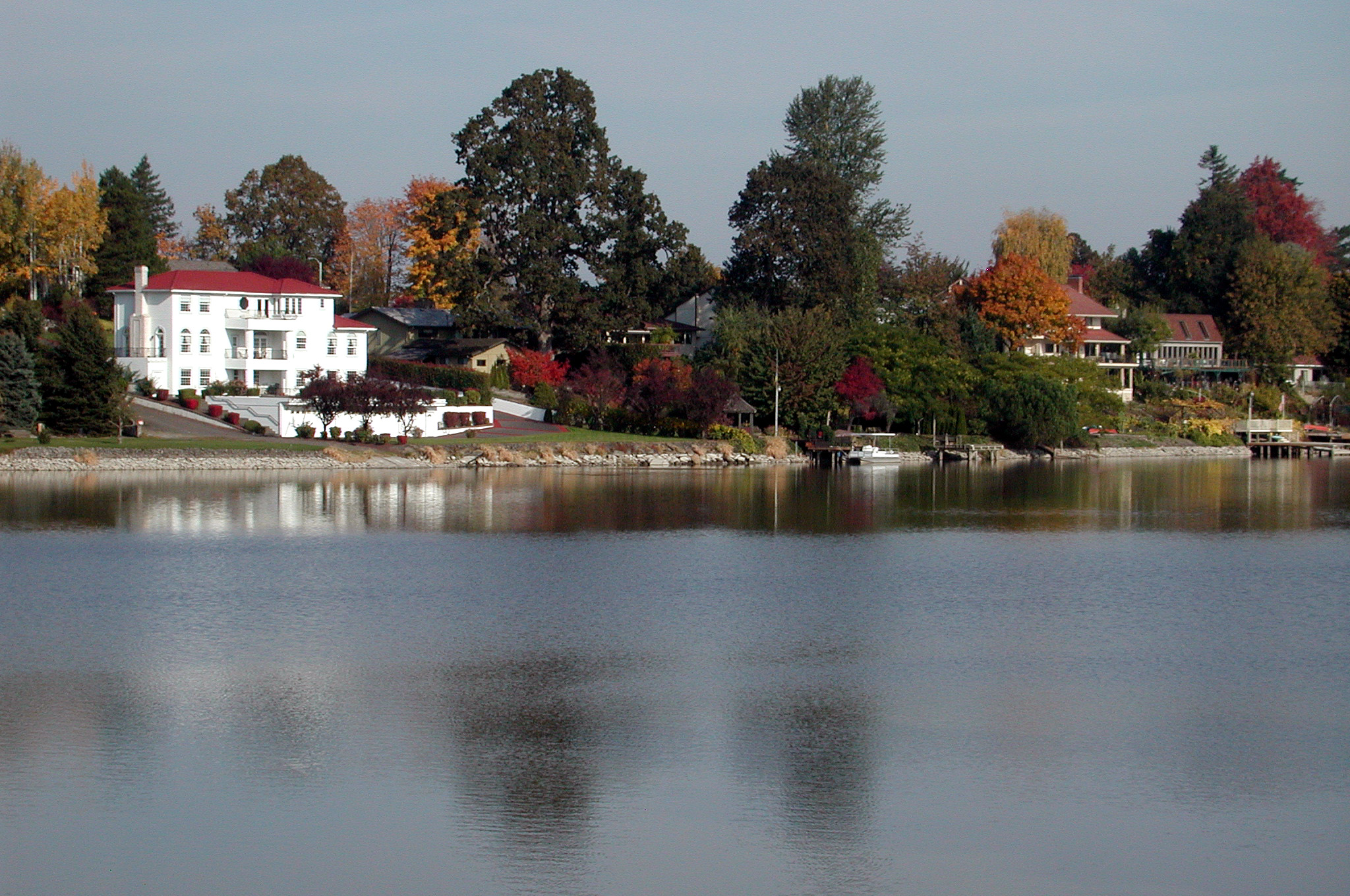
- Fairview Lake

- Seal

- Location in Oregon
- Coordinates: 45°32′49″N 122°26′20″W
- Country: United States
- State: Oregon
- County: Multnomah
- Incorporated: 1908

Government
  - Mayor: Keith Kudrna

Area
  - City: 3.54 sq mi (9.17 km^{2})
  - Land: 3.09 sq mi (8.00 km^{2})
  - Water: 0.45 sq mi (1.17 km^{2})
- Elevation: 23 ft (7 m)

Population (2020)
  - City: 10,424
  - Estimate (2022): 10,768
  - Density: 3,374.1/sq mi (1,302.73/km^{2})
  - Metro: 2,509,489
- Time zone: UTC–8 (Pacific (PST))
  - Summer (DST): UTC–7 (PDT)
- ZIP code: 97024
- Area codes: 503 and 971
- FIPS code: 41-24250
- GNIS feature ID: 2410478
- Website: fairvieworegon.gov

Fairview is a city in Multnomah County, Oregon, United States. It is located in the Portland metropolitan area north of Gresham and west of Troutdale. The population was 10,424 at the 2020 census.

== History ==
Members of the Multnomah tribe of Chinookan Indians lived in a village on Sauvie Island by the Columbia River (the future site of Fairview) when the Lewis and Clark Expedition visited the area in 1806. By the 1840s and 1850s, white settlers began hay, grain, and livestock operations in what would become eastern Multnomah County. Railroad tracks extended to the area by the 1890s. As the population grew, it may be assumed that residents began referring to the locale as Fairview because of the pleasing views of the nearby Columbia, the Columbia River Gorge, and Mount Hood, though an alternative testimony explains this name originated from the area's ideal lookout spot for approaching hostile natives. Since another community named Fairview already existed on the Oregon Coast, the community's first post office was named Cleone until the coastal post office closed and the name was transferred to Fairview.

In the mid-1980s, the city attempted to annex a large section of unincorporated territory in eastern Multnomah County. The plan would have created a city of about 120,000 residents, which at the time would have ranked as the second most populous city in Oregon, behind only Portland. In September 1985, the Oregon Supreme Court ruled that the attempt was invalid as state law required two cities to start any attempt at consolidation, and only Fairview had initiated this attempt.

A large Fairview employer is Townsend Farms, which operates a berry freezing cannery. In 2020 the company had approximately 350 employees in the region, with 450 seasonal workers; it was the source of a Hepatitis A outbreak in pomegranate seeds in 2013 that infected 127 people in 8 states. The product was recalled under its Townsend Farms brand at Costco and private labeled at Harris Teeter, and later linked to Goknur Foodstuffs Import Export Trading in Turkey by the FDA. The cannery itself had a COVID-19 outbreak in 2020, which may have caused two waves of infections affecting at least 48 people. The cannery did not shut down, and the outbreak spread for weeks before the state was notified. The company has blueberry orchards in Applegate Valley near Grants Pass and Cornelius, as well as others in Oregon and Washington.

On August 31, 2024, a small plane crashed into power transmission lines and a row of townhouses in Fairview setting the row afire, killing two people aboard the plane and one in a townhouse, and causing temporary power outages across eastern Multnomah County. The Cessna 421C was on a maintenance test flight from Troutdale Airport, about 1.5 miles (2.4 km) east of the crash site. Flames from the crash destroyed three townhouses and badly damaged three others.

== Geography ==
According to the United States Census Bureau, the city has a total area of 3.58 square miles (9.27 km^{2}), of which, 3.09 square miles (8.00 km^{2}) is land and 0.49 square miles (1.27 km^{2}) is water.

The area also features the Salish Ponds, two small freshwater lakes popular for fishing and its adjacent hiking trails.

== Demographics ==
Historical population
Census	Pop.	Note	%±
1910	204		—
1920	184		−9.8%
1930	266		44.6%
1940	305		14.7%
1950	438		43.6%
1960	578		32.0%
1970	1,045		80.8%
1980	1,749		67.4%
1990	2,391		36.7%
2000	7,561		216.2%
2010	8,920		18.0%
2020	10,424		16.9%
2022 (est.)	10,768	▲	3.3%
U.S. Decennial Census; 2020 Census

=== 2020 census ===
As of the 2020 census, Fairview had a population of 10,424. The median age was 38.0 years. 20.7% of residents were under the age of 18 and 15.9% of residents were 65 years of age or older. For every 100 females there were 95.2 males, and for every 100 females age 18 and over there were 91.6 males age 18 and over.

The population density was 3,374.6 per square mile.

There were 4,092 households in Fairview, of which 30.8% had children under the age of 18 living in them. Of all households, 41.7% were married-couple households, 18.9% were households with a male householder and no spouse or partner present, and 28.5% were households with a female householder and no spouse or partner present. About 25.1% of all households were made up of individuals and 9.3% had someone living alone who was 65 years of age or older.

There were 4,272 housing units, of which 4.2% were vacant. Among occupied housing units, 52.1% were owner-occupied and 47.9% were renter-occupied. The homeowner vacancy rate was 1.2% and the rental vacancy rate was 4.8%.

100.0% of residents lived in urban areas, while 0% lived in rural areas.

Racial composition as of the 2020 census
Race	Number	Percent
White	6,466	62.0%
Black or African American	580	5.6%
American Indian and Alaska Native	218	2.1%
Asian	668	6.4%
Native Hawaiian and Other Pacific Islander	116	1.1%
Some other race	1,020	9.8%
Two or more races	1,356	13.0%
Hispanic or Latino (of any race)	2,116	20.3%

=== 2010 census ===
As of the 2010 census, there were 8,920 people, 3,544 households, and 2,274 families residing in the city. The population density was 2,886.7 inhabitants per square mile (1,114.6/km^{2}). There were 3,786 housing units at an average density of 1,225.2 per square mile (473.1/km^{2}). The racial makeup of the city was 73.1% White, 4.6% African American, 1.1% Native American, 5.5% Asian, 1.0% Pacific Islander, 9.7% from other races, and 5.0% from two or more races. Hispanic or Latino of any race were 16.4% of the population.

There were 3,544 households, of which 32.2% had children under the age of 18 living with them, 43.9% were married couples living together, 14.4% had a female householder with no husband present, 5.9% had a male householder with no wife present, and 35.8% were non-families. 26.7% of all households were made up of individuals, and 6.8% had someone living alone who was 65 years of age or older. The average household size was 2.51 and the average family size was 3.04.

The median age in the city was 35 years. 23.8% of residents were under the age of 18; 10.2% were between the ages of 18 and 24; 29.6% were from 25 to 44; 26.2% were from 45 to 64; and 10% were 65 years of age or older. The gender makeup of the city was 48.1% male and 51.9% female.

=== 2000 census ===
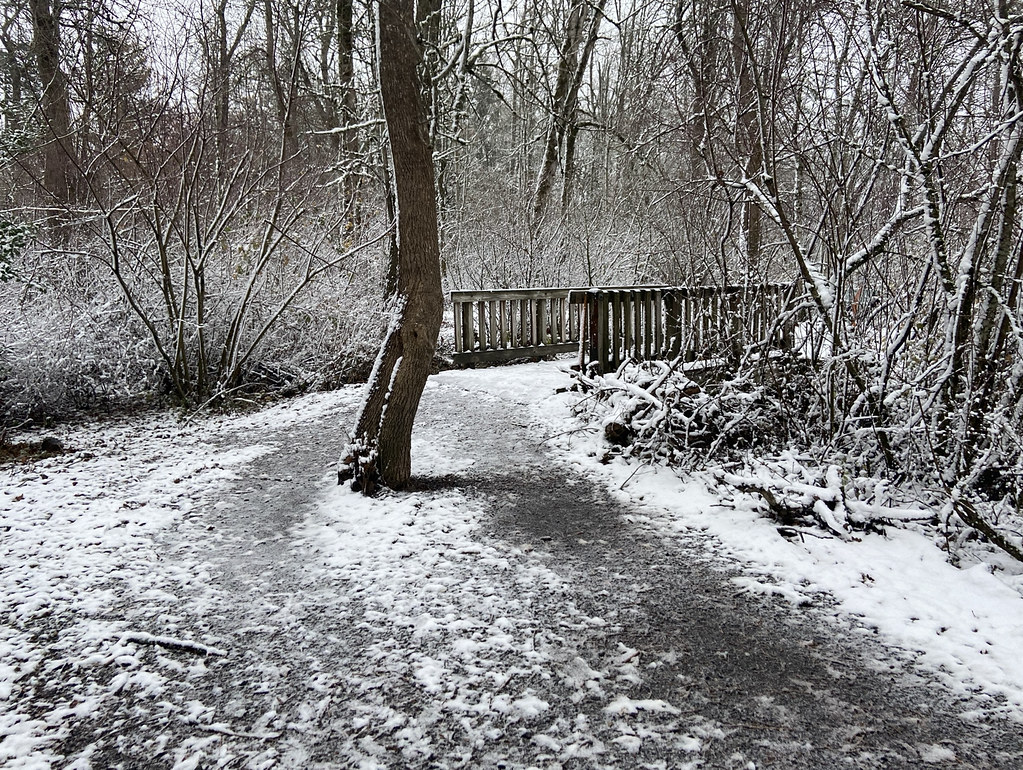
Salish Ponds Park

As of the 2000 census, there were 7,561 people, 2,831 households, and 1,936 families residing in the city. The population density was 2,360.8 inhabitants per square mile (911.5/km^{2}). There were 3,116 housing units at an average density of 972.9 per square mile (375.6/km^{2}). The racial makeup of the city was 76.21% White, 3.44% Asian, 3.04% African American, 0.83% Native American, 0.37% Pacific Islander, 10.51% from other races, and 5.59% from two or more races. 16% of the population were Hispanic or Latino of any race.

There were 2,831 households, out of which 36.0% had children under the age of 18 living with them, 49.9% were married couples living together, 13.3% had a female householder with no husband present, and 31.6% were non-families. 22.6% of all households were made up of individuals, and 5.3% had someone living alone who was 65 years of age or older. The average household size was 2.67 and the average family size was 3.13.

In the city, the population was spread out, with 28.1% under the age of 18, 11.3% from 18 to 24, 33.7% from 25 to 44, 19.5% from 45 to 64, and 7.4% who were 65 years of age or older. The median age was 30 years. For every 100 females, there were 102.7 males. For every 100 females age 18 and over, there were 102.1 males.

The median income for a household in the city was $40,931, and the median income for a family was $43,317. Males had a median income of $37,342 versus $25,909 for females. The per capita income for the city was $19,006. About 13.5% of families and 19.1% of the population were below the poverty line, including 26.1% of those under age 18 and 12.4% of those age 65 or over.

== Government ==
House District 49 encompasses the city of Fairview, as well as surrounding cities of Troutdale, Wood Village, and parts of Gresham. It is represented by Democrat Zach Hudson. As part of House District 49, Fairview is also part of Senate District 25 (composed of House Districts 49 and 50) represented by Democrat Chris Gorsek (who previously served as House representative).

== Education ==
Fairview is served by the Reynolds School District. Fairview Elementary, Salish Ponds Elementary, Woodland Elementary, Reynolds Middle School, and Reynolds Learning Academy (Alternative High School) are in the city.

== Transportation ==
=== TriMet ===
Fairview is served by two Trimet bus lines: 21-Sandy Blvd/233rd and 77-Broadway/Halsey.

=== Major highways ===
- Interstate 84
- U.S. Route 30

== See also ==
- Fairview Woods Park
