= Mt. Hood Community College =

Public college in Gresham, Oregon, US

- Established: 1966
- President: Lisa Skari
- Students: 33,000 (2017)
- Location: Gresham, Oregon, U.S. 45°30′59″N 122°23′44″W
- Campus: 212 acres (86 ha)
- Nickname: Saints
- Website: www.mhcc.edu

Mt. Hood Community College (MHCC) is a public community college in Gresham, Oregon, United States, named after Mount Hood. Opened in 1966, MHCC enrolls around 30,000 students each year and offers classes at the 212-acre (86 ha) main campus in Gresham, as well as the Maywood Park Center in Portland, the Bruning Center for Allied Health Education (also in Gresham), and at area public schools.

The college's sports teams, the Saints, compete in the Northwest Athletic Conference. The college also owns and oversees KMHD, a non-profit FM broadcast radio station based in Portland.

== Campus ==
The main campus occupies 212-acre (86 ha) in Gresham. Other facilities include the Maywood Park campus in Portland, the Bruning Center for Allied Health Education and area public schools. The college is within relatively short distance from the nearby communities Sandy and Clackamas, and is roughly 15 miles (24 km) from downtown Portland.

== Academics ==
MHCC enrolls roughly 30,000 students each year and is accredited by the Northwest Commission on Colleges and Universities. The college's programs include nursing, funeral science, integrated media, automotive technology and transfer opportunities to local universities toward B.A. degrees in humanities and science programs.

The college is financed by local property tax funds, state reimbursement funds and student tuition. Local voters established the college tax base in 1968 and approved tax base increases in 1970 and 1980.

The campus is also home to the Oregon Center for Cybersecurity and offers both associate and bachelor degrees in Cybersecurity.

== Student life ==
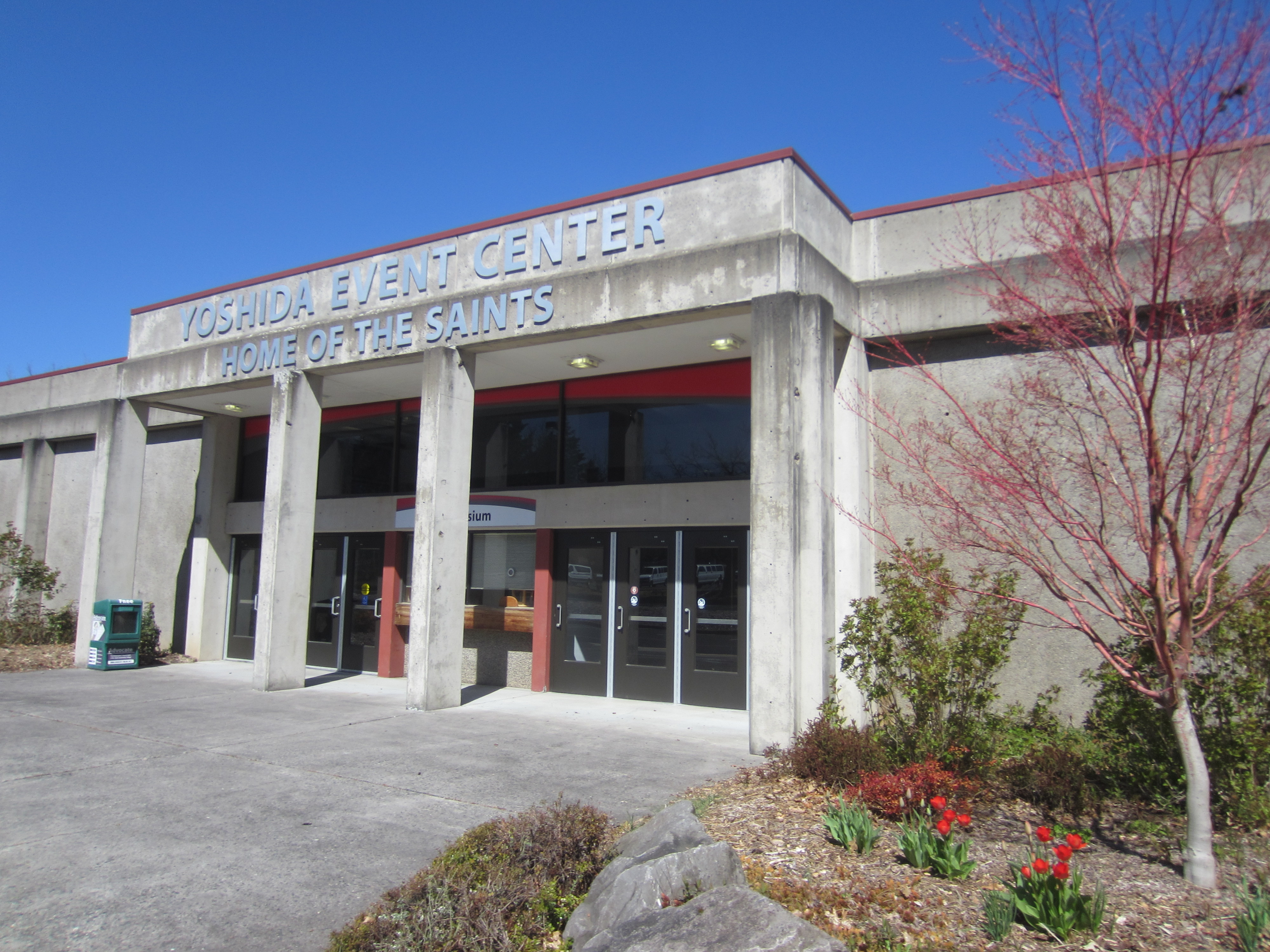
Yoshida Event Center, 2021

The college has historically been known for its jazz performance program, and is the home of jazz radio station KMHD and was the site of the Mt. Hood Jazz Festival each summer from 1982 through 2002 and from 2008 through 2010. The college has an active student government, almost 30 student clubs, and a student newspaper, The Advocate.

The college also annually hosts the Portland Highland Games.

== Athletics ==
Mt. Hood Community College competes in the Northwest Athletic Conference (NWAC). The college nickname is the Saints in reference to the St. Bernard mascot. There are four men's teams including baseball, basketball, track and field, and cross country. There are five women's teams including volleyball, softball, basketball, track and field, and cross country.

The college features a large aquatics center, which includes an indoor swimming pool.

== Notable people ==
=== Alumni ===
- Chris Botti, Grammy Award-winning trumpeter
- Brian Burres, Major League Baseball pitcher
- Dan Carlson, Major League Baseball pitcher
- Marco Eneidi, free jazz saxophonist
- Essiet Essiet, jazz bassist
- Todd Field, Academy Award-nominated filmmaker
- Nick Kahl, politician
- Stafford Mays, NFL player
- Joel David Moore, actor and director
- Lillian Pitt, Native American artist
- Patti Smith, politician
- Dave Veres, Major League Baseball pitcher
- Lindsay Wagner, actress
- Paul Wenner, creator of the Gardenburger vegetarian patty

=== Faculty ===
- Chris Gorsek, politician
- Paul Mazzio, jazz trumpeter
- Lidia Yuknavitch, writer

=== Presidents ===
- 1966–1976: Earl Klapstein
- 1976–1985: R. Stephen Nicholson
- 1985–1996: Paul E. Kreider
- 1996–2000: Joel E. Vela
- 2001–2007: Robert Silverman
- 2008–2011: John J. "Ski" Sygielski
- 2011-2013: Michael Hay
- 2013-2018: Debra Derr
- 2018-present: Lisa Skari

== See also ==
- List of Oregon community colleges
