= Wood Village, Oregon =

- City
- Flag Seal
- Motto: The city that cares
- Location in Oregon
- Coordinates: 45°32′09″N 122°25′14″W
- Country: United States
- State: Oregon
- County: Multnomah
- Incorporated: 1951

Government
  - Mayor: Jairo Ríos

Area
  - Total: 0.94 sq mi (2.44 km^{2})
  - Land: 0.94 sq mi (2.44 km^{2})
  - Water: 0 sq mi (0.00 km^{2})
- Elevation: 151 ft (46 m)

Population (2020)
  - Total: 4,387
  - Density: 4,655.4/sq mi (1,797.46/km^{2})
- Time zone: UTC-8 (Pacific)
  - Summer (DST): UTC-7 (Pacific)
- ZIP code: 97060
- Area code: 503
- FIPS code: 41-83950
- GNIS feature ID: 2412294
- Website: City of Wood Village

Wood Village is a city in Multnomah County, Oregon, United States. It is located between Fairview to the west, Troutdale to the east, and Gresham to the south. The population was 4,387 at the 2020 census. Despite the name, Wood Village is classified as a city.

== History ==
Wood Village was built as a company town for the Reynolds Aluminum plant in Troutdale; the plant closed in 2000. The city was also formerly home to a 90,000-square-foot (8,400 m^{2}) Merix Corporation plant. It was incorporated by a vote of 156–35, with narrow approval from Fairview voters, on June 18, 1949.

Proposals to consolidate Wood Village with neighboring Fairview and Troutdale were seriously considered in the late 1960s and early 1980s.

The community's new city hall opened in September 2021.

== Geography ==
According to the United States Census Bureau, the city has a total area of 0.94 square miles (2.43 km^{2}), all of it land. Among the city's parks is Donald L. Robertson Park.

== Demographics ==
Historical population
Census	Pop.	Note	%±
1960	822		—
1970	1,533		86.5%
1980	2,253		47.0%
1990	2,814		24.9%
2000	2,860		1.6%
2010	3,878		35.6%
2020	4,387		13.1%
U.S. Decennial Census; 2013 Estimate

=== 2020 census ===
As of the 2020 census, Wood Village had a population of 4,387. The median age was 33.2 years. 28.9% of residents were under the age of 18 and 10.3% of residents were 65 years of age or older. For every 100 females there were 102.9 males, and for every 100 females age 18 and over there were 102.5 males age 18 and over.

As of the 2020 census, 100.0% of residents lived in urban areas, while 0% lived in rural areas.

There were 1,331 households in Wood Village, of which 46.4% had children under the age of 18 living in them. Of all households, 47.8% were married-couple households, 16.8% were households with a male householder and no spouse or partner present, and 25.1% were households with a female householder and no spouse or partner present. About 16.3% of all households were made up of individuals and 6.4% had someone living alone who was 65 years of age or older. There were 1,370 housing units, of which 2.8% were vacant. Among occupied housing units, 66.0% were owner-occupied and 34.0% were renter-occupied. The homeowner vacancy rate was 0.7% and the rental vacancy rate was 1.1%.

Racial composition as of the 2020 census
Race	Number	Percent
White	2,177	49.6%
Black or African American	85	1.9%
American Indian and Alaska Native	200	4.6%
Asian	171	3.9%
Native Hawaiian and Other Pacific Islander	33	0.8%
Some other race	1,098	25.0%
Two or more races	623	14.2%
Hispanic or Latino (of any race)	1,877	42.8%

=== 2010 census ===
At the 2010 census, there were 3,878 people in 1,223 households, including 880 families, in the city. The population density was 4,125.5 inhabitants per square mile (1,592.9/km^{2}). There were 1,289 housing units at an average density of 1,371.3 per square mile (529.5/km^{2}). The racial makeup of the city was 62.6% White, 2.0% African American, 2.3% Native American, 3.8% Asian, 0.2% Pacific Islander, 25.0% from other races, and 4.1% from two or more races. Hispanic or Latino of any race were 37.0%.

Of the 1,223 households, 46.4% had children under the age of 18 living with them, 48.4% were married couples living together, 16.3% had a female householder with no husband present, 7.3% had a male householder with no wife present, and 28.0% were non-families. 20.8% of households were one person and 5.3% were one person aged 65 or older. The average household size was 3.11 and the average family size was 3.59.

The median age was 30.7 years. 32.2% of residents were under the age of 18; 8.7% were between the ages of 18 and 24; 29.8% were from 25 to 44; 21.6% were from 45 to 64; and 7.5% were 65 or older. The gender makeup of the city was 50.9% male and 49.1% female.

=== 2000 census ===
At the 2000 census, there were 2,860 people in 1,014 households, including 701 families, in the city. The population density was 3,004.1 inhabitants per square mile (1,159.9/km^{2}). There were 1,089 housing units at an average density of 1,143.9 per square mile (441.7/km^{2}). The racial makeup of the city was 81.68% White, 0.56% African American, 1.29% Native American, 1.71% Asian, 0.24% Pacific Islander, 9.86% from other races, and 4.65% from two or more races. Hispanic or Latino of any race were 15.21%.

Of the 1,014 households, 38.6% had children under the age of 18 living with them, 45.9% were married couples living together, 16.8% had a female householder with no husband present, and 30.8% were non-families. 23.9% of households were one person and 6.8% were one person aged 65 or older. The average household size was 2.76 and the average family size was 3.22.

The age distribution was as follows: 28.6% under the age of 18, 10.2% from 18 to 24, 32.8% from 25 to 44, 19.7% from 45 to 64, and 8.6% 65 or older. The median age was 31 years. For every 100 females, there were 102.7 males. For every 100 females age 18 and over, there were 97.2 males.

The median household income was $43,384 and the median family income was $48,167. Males had a median income of $31,577 versus $25,500 for females. The per capita income for the city was $17,833. About 6.9% of families and 8.3% of the population were below the poverty line, including 7.9% of those under age 18 and 2.9% of those age 65 or over.

== Transportation ==
TriMet serves the city with bus service and connections to light rail.
