= 76th Oregon Legislative Assembly =

←	75th Legislative Assembly	77th Legislative Assembly	→
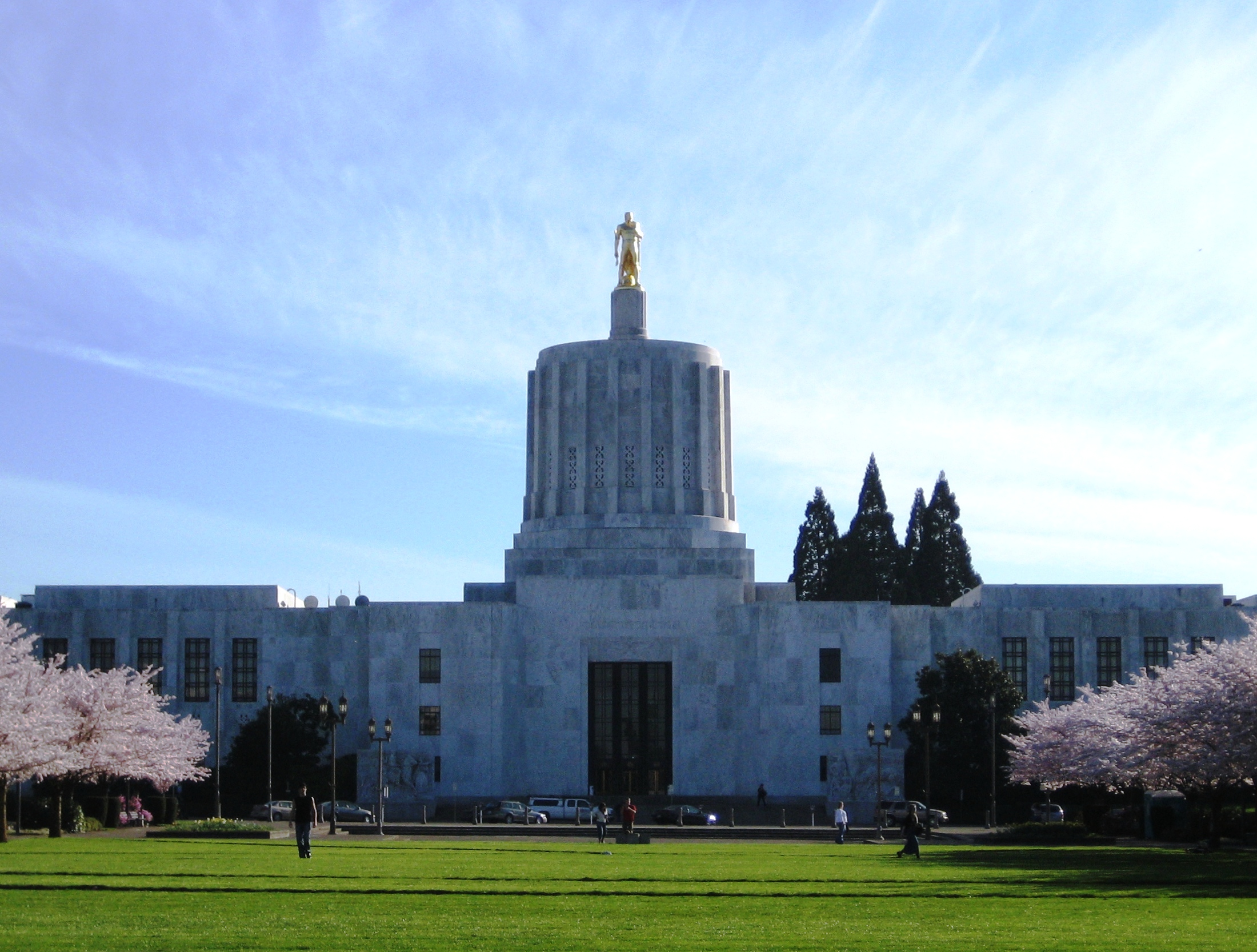
- The legislature took place in the Oregon State Capitol, seen here in 2007

Overview
- Legislative body: Oregon Legislative Assembly
- Jurisdiction: Oregon, United States
- Meeting place: Oregon State Capitol
- Term: 2011–2012
- Website: www.leg.state.or.us

Oregon State Senate
- Members: 30 Senators
- Senate President: Peter Courtney
- Majority Leader: Diane Rosenbaum
- Minority Leader: Ted Ferrioli
- Party control: Democratic

Oregon House of Representatives
- Members: 60 Representatives
- Co-Speaker: Bruce Hanna
- Co-Speaker: Arnie Roblan
- Party leaders: K. Cameron (R) / T. Kotek (D)
- Party control: split

The 76th Oregon Legislative Assembly convened beginning on January 11, 2011, for the first of its two regular sessions. All 60 seats of the House of Representatives and 16 of the 30 state senate seats were up for election in 2010. The general election for those seats took place on November 2. The Democrats retained the majority in the senate, but lost six seats in the house, leading to an even split (30-30) between Democrats and Republicans. The governor of Oregon during the session was John Kitzhaber, a Democrat, who was elected to a third term in 2010 following an eight-year absence from public office.

The even split in the House of Representatives was addressed with the selection of two co-speakers, Democrat Arnie Roblan and Republican Bruce Hanna. The two were selected by Governing Magazine among its eight "Public Officials of the Year," and praised for "setting in motion a tenure that has been marked by rare bipartisan cooperation and two of the most productive legislative sessions in Oregon's history."

The 76th was the first session in which the legislature met twice in regular session, following the 2010 passage of Ballot Measure 71, which instituted a second regular session for each two-year legislative term.

== Senate members ==
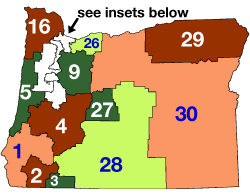
Oregon Senate districts outside the Willamette Valley

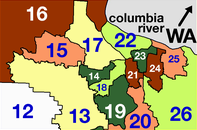
Portland area Senate districts.

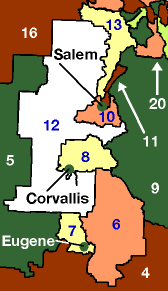
Willamette Valley Senate districts south of Portland area.

The Oregon State Senate was composed of 16 Democrats and 14 Republicans. In the last election, the Democratic Party lost two seats: in District 20, Martha Schrader lost a close election to Alan Olsen and in District 26, Rick Metsger did not seek re-election and was replaced by Chuck Thomsen.

Senate President: Peter Courtney (D–11 Salem)
President Pro Tem: Ginny Burdick (D–18 Portland)
Majority Leader: Diane Rosenbaum (D–21 Portland)
Minority Leader: Ted Ferrioli (R–30 John Day)

District	Home	Senator	Party
1	Roseburg	Jeff Kruse	Republican
2	Central Point	Jason Atkinson	Republican
3	Ashland	Alan C. Bates	Democratic
4	S. Lane/N. Douglas cos.	Floyd Prozanski	Democratic
5	Coos Bay	Joanne Verger	Democratic
6	Springfield	Lee Beyer	Democratic
7	Eugene	Chris Edwards	Democratic
8	Albany	Frank Morse	Republican
8	Albany	Betsy Close	Republican
9	Molalla	Fred Girod	Republican
10	Salem	Jackie Winters	Republican
11	Salem	Peter Courtney	Democratic
12	McMinnville	Brian Boquist	Republican
13	Hillsboro	Larry George	Republican
14	Beaverton	Mark Hass	Democratic
15	Hillsboro	Bruce Starr	Republican
16	Scappoose	Betsy Johnson	Democratic
17	Multnomah County	Suzanne Bonamici	Democratic
17	Multnomah County	Elizabeth Steiner Hayward	Democratic
18	Portland	Ginny Burdick	Democratic
19	Tualatin	Richard Devlin	Democratic
20	Canby	Alan Olsen	Republican
21	Portland	Diane Rosenbaum	Democratic
22	Portland	Chip Shields	Democratic
23	Portland	Jackie Dingfelder	Democratic
24	Portland	Rod Monroe	Democratic
25	Gresham	Laurie Monnes Anderson	Democratic
26	Hood River	Chuck Thomsen	Republican
27	Tumalo	Chris Telfer	Republican
28	Klamath Falls	Doug Whitsett	Republican
29	Pendleton	David Nelson	Republican
30	John Day	Ted Ferrioli	Republican

== House members ==
The Oregon House of Representatives was split evenly between 30 Democrats and 30 Republicans and the parties shared control of the chamber. Republicans gained six seats over the previous session.

Co-Speaker: Bruce Hanna (R–7 Roseburg)
Co-Speaker: Arnie Roblan (D–9 Coos Bay)
Co-Speaker Pro Tempore: Tina Kotek (D–44 Portland)
Co-Speaker Pro Tempore: Andy Olson (R–15 Albany)
Republican Leader Representative: Kevin Cameron (R–19 Salem)
Democratic Leader Representative: Dave Hunt (D–40 Gladstone) (Jan. 11, 2011 – June 30, 2011), Tina Kotek (D–44 Portland) (June 30, 2011–end of legislative assembly)

District	Home	Representative	Party
1	Gold Beach	Wayne Krieger	Republican
2	Roseburg	Tim Freeman	Republican
3	Grants Pass	Wally Hicks	Republican
4	Central Point	Dennis Richardson	Republican
5	Ashland	Peter Buckley	Democratic
6	Medford	Sal Esquivel	Republican
7	Roseburg	Bruce Hanna	Republican
8	Eugene	Paul Holvey	Democratic
9	Coos Bay	Arnie Roblan	Democratic
10	Newport	Jean Cowan	Democratic
11	Central Linn/Lane Cos.	Phil Barnhart	Democratic
12	Springfield	E. Terry Beyer	Democratic
13	Eugene	Nancy Nathanson	Democratic
14	Eugene	Val Hoyle	Democratic
15	Albany	Andy Olson	Republican
16	Corvallis	Sara Gelser	Democratic
17	Scio	Sherrie Sprenger	Republican
18	Silverton	Vic Gilliam	Republican
19	Salem	Kevin Cameron	Republican
20	Salem	Vicki Berger	Republican
21	Salem	Brian L. Clem	Democratic
22	Woodburn	Betty Komp	Democratic
23	Dallas	Jim Thompson	Republican
24	McMinnville	Jim Weidner	Republican
25	Keizer	Kim Thatcher	Republican
26	Wilsonville	Matt Wingard	Republican
27	Washington Co.	Tobias Read	Democratic
28	Aloha	Jeff Barker	Democratic
29	Hillsboro	Katie Eyre Brewer	Republican
30	Hillsboro	Shawn Lindsay	Republican
31	Clatskanie	Brad Witt	Democratic
32	Cannon Beach	Deborah Boone	Democratic
33	Portland	Mitch Greenlick	Democratic
34	Washington Co.	Chris Harker	Democratic
35	Tigard	Margaret Doherty	Democratic
36	Portland	Mary Nolan	Democratic
37	West Linn	Julie Parrish	Republican
38	Lake Oswego	Chris Garrett	Democratic
39	Oregon City	Bill Kennemer	Republican
40	Gladstone	Dave Hunt	Democratic
41	Milwaukie	Carolyn Tomei	Democratic
42	Portland	Jules Bailey	Democratic
43	Portland	Lew Frederick	Democratic
44	Portland	Tina Kotek	Democratic
45	Portland	Michael Dembrow	Democratic
46	Portland	Ben Cannon	Democratic
46	Portland	Alissa Keny-Guyer	Democratic
47	Portland	Jefferson Smith	Democratic
48	Happy Valley	Mike Schaufler	Democratic
49	Troutdale	Matt Wand	Republican
50	Gresham	Greg Matthews	Democratic
51	Clackamas	Patrick Sheehan	Republican
52	Hood River	Mark Johnson	Republican
53	Sunriver	Gene Whisnant	Republican
54	Bend	Jason Conger	Republican
55	Bend	Mike McLane	Republican
56	Klamath Falls	Bill Garrard	Republican
57	Heppner	Greg Smith	Republican
58	Pendleton	Bob Jenson	Republican
59	The Dalles	John Huffman	Republican
60	Ontario	Cliff Bentz	Republican

Preceded by 75th legislature	76th Oregon Legislative Assembly; 2011–2012	Succeeded by 77th legislature
