= 77th Oregon Legislative Assembly =

←	76th Legislative Assembly	78th Legislative Assembly	→
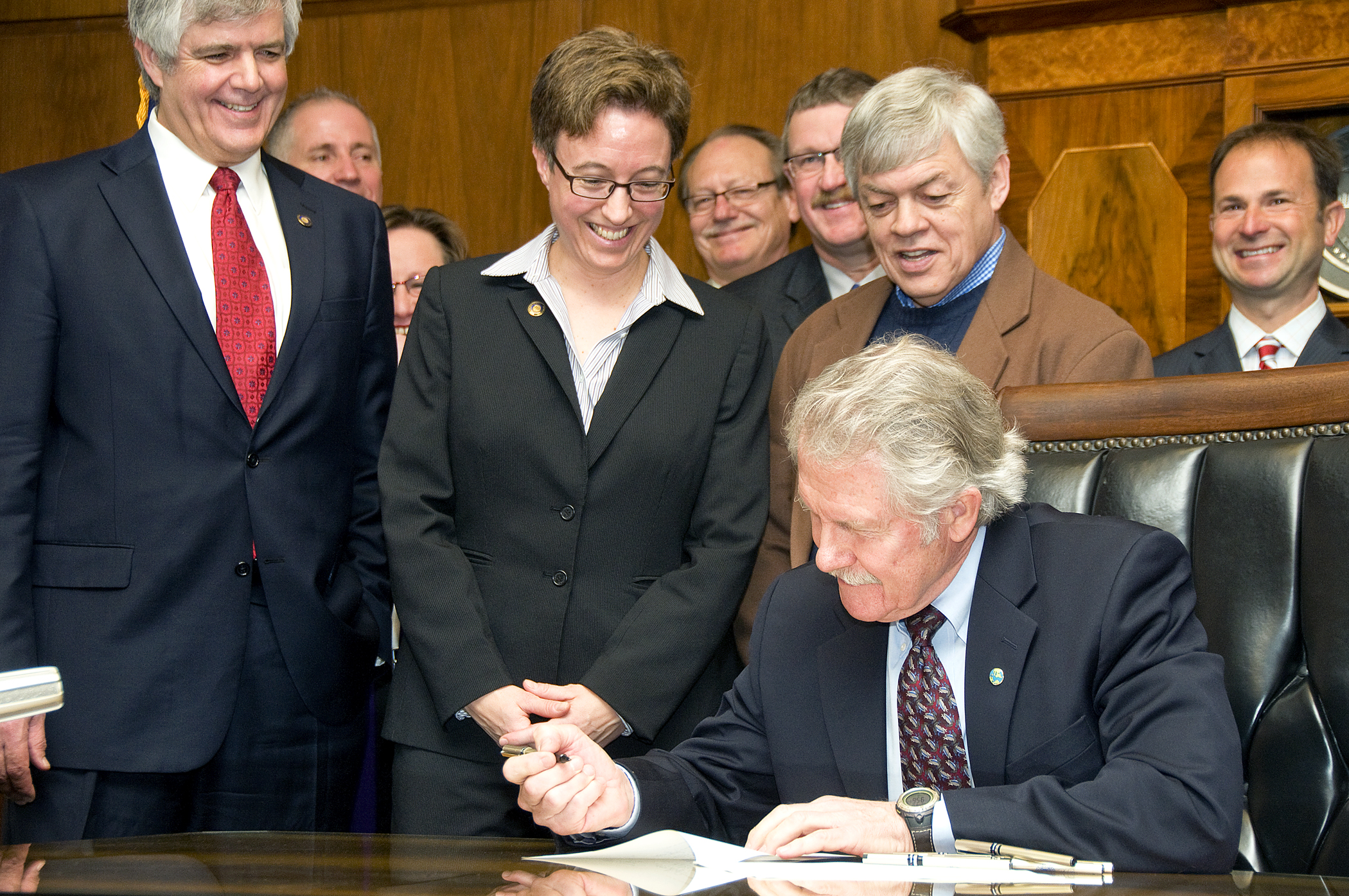
- Oregon Governor John Kitzhaber signs House Bill 2800 in the 2013 regular session, as House Speaker Tina Kotek and others look on. The bill authorizes funding for the Columbia River Crossing.

Overview
- Legislative body: Oregon Legislative Assembly
- Jurisdiction: Oregon, United States
- Meeting place: Oregon State Capitol
- Term: 2013–2014
- Website: www.leg.state.or.us

Oregon State Senate
- Members: 30 Senators
- Senate President: Peter Courtney (D)
- Majority Leader: Diane Rosenbaum (D)
- Minority Leader: Ted Ferrioli (R)
- Party control: Democratic

Oregon House of Representatives
- Members: 60 Representatives
- Speaker of the House: Tina Kotek (D)
- Majority Leader: Val Hoyle (D)
- Minority Leader: Mike McLane (R)
- Party control: Democratic

The 77th Oregon Legislative Assembly convened beginning on January 14, 2013, for the first of its two regular sessions, and on February 3, 2014 for its second session. All of the 60 seats in the House of Representatives and 16 of the 30 seats in the State Senate were up for election in 2012; the general election for those seats took place on November 6, 2012.

The Democratic Party of Oregon retained its 16–14 majority in the Senate, and took a 34–26 majority in the House, which in the previous session had been split evenly with the Oregon Republican Party.

== Senate ==
Based on the results of the 2012 elections, the Oregon State Senate is composed of 16 Democrats and 14 Republicans, the same composition as in the previous session.

== Senate members ==
Map of Senate districts after the 2012 elections

The Oregon State Senate is composed of 16 Democrats and 14 Republicans, the same composition as the previous session.

Senate President: Peter Courtney (D–11 Salem)
President Pro Tem: Ginny Burdick (D–18 Portland)
Majority Leader: Diane Rosenbaum (D–21 Portland)
Minority Leader: Ted Ferrioli (R–30 John Day)

District	Home	Senator	Party
1	Roseburg	Jeff Kruse	Republican
2	Central Point	Herman Baertschiger Jr.	Republican
3	Ashland	Alan C. Bates	Democratic
4	Eugene	Floyd Prozanski	Democratic
5	Coos Bay	Arnie Roblan	Democratic
6	Springfield	Lee Beyer	Democratic
7	Eugene	Chris Edwards	Democratic
8	Albany	Betsy Close	Republican
9	Molalla	Fred Girod	Republican
10	Salem	Jackie Winters	Republican
11	Salem	Peter Courtney	Democratic
12	McMinnville	Brian Boquist	Republican
13	Hillsboro	Larry George	Republican
14	Beaverton	Mark Hass	Democratic
15	Hillsboro	Bruce Starr	Republican
16	Scappoose	Betsy Johnson	Democratic
17	Multnomah County	Elizabeth Steiner Hayward	Democratic
18	Portland	Ginny Burdick	Democratic
19	Tualatin	Richard Devlin	Democratic
20	Canby	Alan Olsen	Republican
21	Portland	Diane Rosenbaum	Democratic
22	Portland	Chip Shields	Democratic
23	Portland	Jackie Dingfelder	Democratic
23	Portland	Michael Dembrow	Democratic
24	Portland	Rod Monroe	Democratic
25	Gresham	Laurie Monnes Anderson	Democratic
26	Hood River	Chuck Thomsen	Republican
27	Bend	Tim Knopp	Republican
28	Klamath Falls	Doug Whitsett	Republican
29	Pendleton	Bill Hansell	Republican
30	John Day	Ted Ferrioli	Republican

== House members ==
Based on the results of the 2012 elections, the Oregon House of Representatives is composed of 34 Democrats and 26 Republicans. Prior to the elections, the House was evenly split between 30 Democrats and 30 Republicans.

Speaker: Tina Kotek (D–44 Portland)
Majority Leader: Val Hoyle (D–14 Eugene)
Minority Leader: Mike McLane (R–55 Powell Butte)

District	Home	Representative	Party
1	Gold Beach	Wayne Krieger	Republican
2	Roseburg	Tim Freeman	Republican
3	Grants Pass	Wally Hicks	Republican
4	Central Point	Dennis Richardson	Republican
5	Ashland	Peter Buckley	Democratic
6	Medford	Sal Esquivel	Republican
7	Roseburg	Bruce Hanna	Republican
8	Eugene	Paul Holvey	Democratic
9	Coos Bay	Caddy McKeown	Democratic
10	Newport	David Gomberg	Democratic
11	Central Linn/Lane Cos.	Phil Barnhart	Democratic
12	Springfield	John Lively	Democratic
13	Eugene	Nancy Nathanson	Democratic
14	Eugene	Val Hoyle	Democratic
15	Albany	Andy Olson	Republican
16	Corvallis	Sara Gelser	Democratic
17	Scio	Sherrie Sprenger	Republican
18	Silverton	Vic Gilliam	Republican
19	Salem	Kevin Cameron	Republican
20	Salem	Vicki Berger	Republican
21	Salem	Brian L. Clem	Democratic
22	Woodburn	Betty Komp	Democratic
23	Dallas	Jim Thompson	Republican
24	McMinnville	Jim Weidner	Republican
25	Keizer	Kim Thatcher	Republican
26	Wilsonville	John Davis	Republican
27	Washington Co.	Tobias Read	Democratic
28	Aloha	Jeff Barker	Democratic
29	Hillsboro	Ben Unger	Democratic
30	Hillsboro	Joe Gallegos	Democratic
31	Clatskanie	Brad Witt	Democratic
32	Cannon Beach	Deborah Boone	Democratic
33	Portland	Mitch Greenlick	Democratic
34	Washington Co.	Chris Harker	Democratic
35	Tigard	Margaret Doherty	Democratic
36	Portland	Jennifer Williamson	Democratic
37	West Linn	Julie Parrish	Republican
38	Lake Oswego	Chris Garrett	Democratic
38	Lake Oswego	Ann Lininger	Democratic
39	Oregon City	Bill Kennemer	Republican
40	Gladstone	Brent Barton	Democratic
41	Milwaukie	Carolyn Tomei	Democratic
42	Portland	Jules Bailey	Democratic
42	Portland	Rob Nosse	Democratic
43	Portland	Lew Frederick	Democratic
44	Portland	Tina Kotek	Democratic
45	Portland	Michael Dembrow	Democratic
45	Portland	Barbara Smith Warner	Democratic
46	Portland	Alissa Keny-Guyer	Democratic
47	Portland	Jessica Vega Pederson	Democratic
48	Happy Valley	Jeff Reardon	Democratic
49	Troutdale	Chris Gorsek	Democratic
50	Gresham	Greg Matthews	Democratic
51	Clackamas	Shemia Fagan	Democratic
52	Hood River	Mark Johnson	Republican
53	Sunriver	Gene Whisnant	Republican
54	Bend	Jason Conger	Republican
55	Powell Butte	Mike McLane	Republican
56	Klamath Falls	Gail Whitsett	Republican
57	Heppner	Greg Smith	Republican
58	Pendleton	Bob Jenson	Republican
59	The Dalles	John Huffman	Republican
60	Ontario	Cliff Bentz	Republican

== See also ==
- Oregon legislative elections, 2012
