= 75th Oregon Legislative Assembly =

←	74th Legislative Assembly	76th Legislative Assembly	→
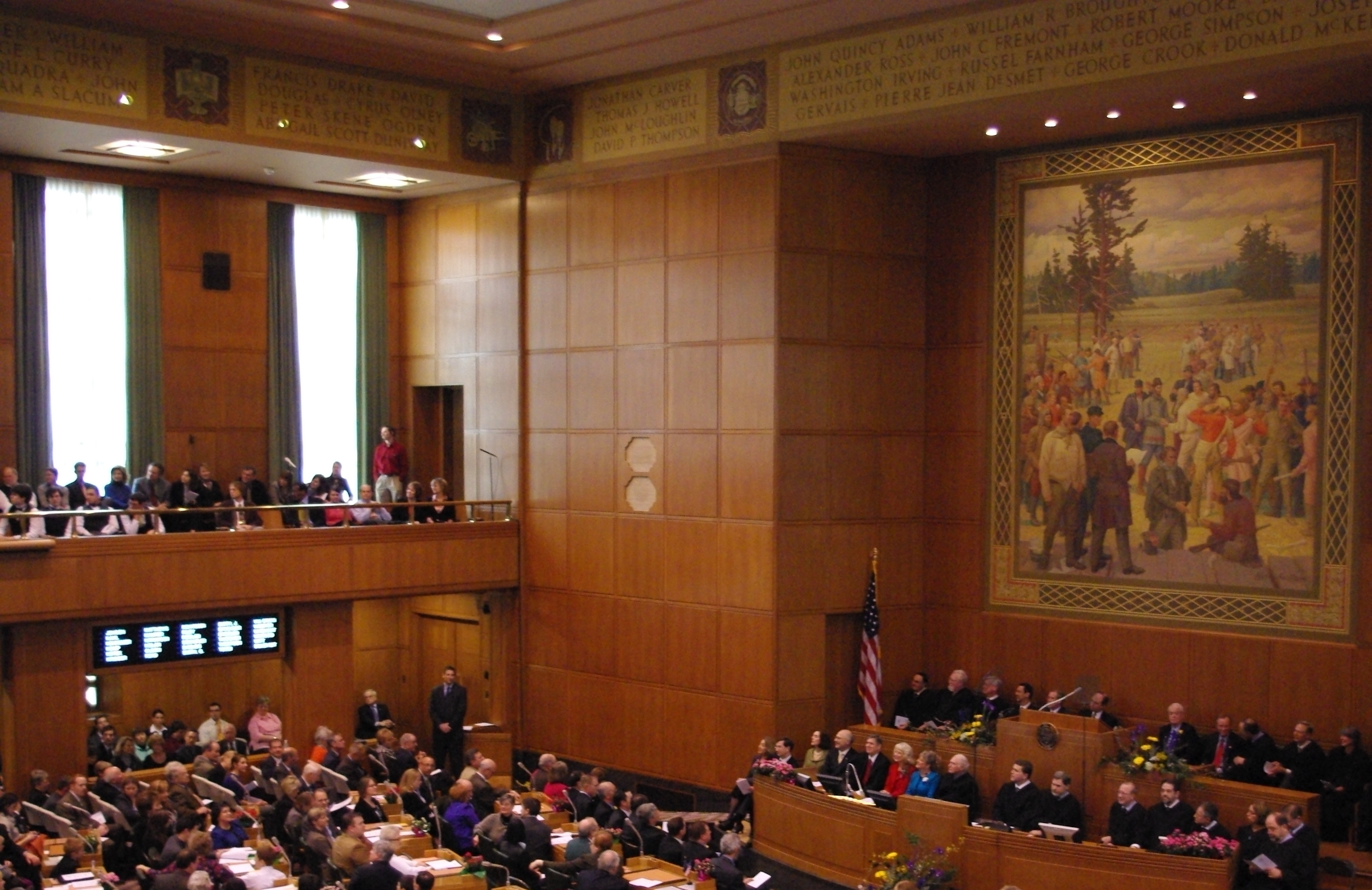
- Opening ceremonies of the session

Overview
- Legislative body: Oregon Legislative Assembly
- Jurisdiction: Oregon, United States
- Meeting place: Oregon State Capitol
- Term: 2009–2010

Oregon State Senate
- Members: 30 Senators
- Senate President: Peter Courtney
- Majority Leader: Richard Devlin
- Minority Leader: Ted Ferrioli
- Party control: Democratic Party

Oregon House of Representatives
- Members: 60 Representatives
- Speaker of the House: Dave Hunt
- Majority Leader: Mary Nolan
- Minority Leader: Bruce Hanna
- Party control: Democratic Party

Senate during the 75th assembly

House of Representatives during the 75th assembly

The 75th Oregon Legislative Assembly convened beginning on January 12, 2009, for its biennial regular session. All of the 60 seats in the House of Representatives and half of the 30 seats in the State Senate were up for election in 2008; the general election for those seats took place on November 4.

The results:

Senate: Democrats 18 seats, Republicans 12 seats

House: Democrats 36 seats, Republicans 24 seats

Democrats took control of the Senate in the 2004 elections, and of the House in the 2006 elections. The Senate had been controlled by Republicans since 1997 and the House since 1990. Many Republican legislators resigned or declined to run for reelection in 2008. Democrats lost one seat in the Senate, and gained five in the House.

The Republican House caucus released an agenda for the 2009 session; priorities included improving economic growth, bringing accountability to state government, improving the state's education system, extending health care and extending in-home care for seniors, enhancing public safety, and managing natural resources. House Majority Leader Dave Hunt (D–Gladstone) responded to the agenda in July 2008, characterizing it as a departure from the failed policies of the George W. Bush administration, and stating that the problems Republicans seek to solve resulted from 14 years of Republican leadership. The House Democrats also released an agenda for 2009.

The legislature, in its 2009 regular session, worked to close a budget shortfall brought on by the economic recession. One critical factor in the legislature's work is the fact that Democrats hold three fifths of the seats in each chamber, theoretically providing the three-fifths supermajority support required by the Oregon Constitution for bills to increase revenue.

In the effort to balance the budget, bills were passed to raise income taxes on corporations and wealthy individuals and households. This is expected to raise US$733 million in revenue over the next two years, which is meant to lessen the need to make spending cuts to state services and programs. Opponents led an effort to force a statewide referendum on these increases, which appeared as Measures 66 and 67 on the January 26, 2010 special election ballot. They were both passed by voters and took effect February 25, 2010.

The 2009 Legislature passed two major new laws that had been unsuccessfully attempted for several prior years:

The Jobs & Transportation Act (the largest jobs bill in Oregon history) was passed with funding for the Sunrise Highway Corridor in Clackamas County, Newberg-Dundee Bypass, Woodburn/I-5 Interchange, Highway 62 extension in Medford, Beltline/I-5 Interchange in Eugene, and major new permanent annual road funding for all Oregon cities and counties. The Act also allocated $100 to ConnectOregon to improve air, rail, and marine infrastructure.

The Healthy Kids Act was passed to provide health insurance to 90,000 uninsured children and 30,000 low-income adults, which resulted in Oregon reducing the number of uninsured children by more than any other state.

== Sessions ==
The Oregon Constitution requires the Legislative Assembly to hold regular sessions once every two years, but the body can hold special sessions called by either the governor or the body itself. Only four other states' legislatures hold regular sessions every other year: Montana, Nevada, North Dakota, and Texas. Until November 2008, Arkansas was the sixth state. In recent years, the Legislative Assembly has considered switching from biennial to annual regular sessions, as recommended by the Public Commission on the Oregon Legislature. To test the idea, the 74th legislature called itself into a special session in 2008, calling it a "supplemental" session to the regular one in 2007.

Likewise, the current legislative body will hold a supplemental session in 2010, expected to start February 1 and to last four weeks. Among other tasks, the legislature plans to refer a ballot measure to voters to amend the state constitution to permanently change to annual sessions. A ballot measure is required because all constitutional amendments must be approved by voters. The legislature also plans to refer a constitutional amendment to voters to redirect tax rebate funds into a state reserve, or "rainy day," fund.

== Notable legislation ==
=== 2009 regular session ===
In the effort to balance the budget, House Bills 2639 and 3405 were passed, raising taxes on corporations, and on wealthy individuals and households, respectively. HB 3405 replaced the corporate minimum tax of $10, paid by two thirds of corporations in Oregon, with a sliding scale: At the bottom of the scale, corporations with sales under $500,000 in Oregon will pay $150; at the top, corporations with sales over $100 million will pay $100,000. Corporate income greater than $250,000 will be taxed 7.9 percent for two years, then 7.6 percent afterwards. Corporate income below this threshold will be taxed 6.6 percent. Under HB 2639, taxable income greater than $125,000 for individuals and $250,000 for joint filers will pay a rate of 10.8 percent for the next three years, up from 9 percent; after that, the rate drops to 9.9 percent. Also, income higher than $250,000 for individuals and $500,000 for households will be taxed at 11 percent. These two bills are expected to raise $733 million in revenue over the next two years.

The bills cleared the Joint Ways and Means Committee on June 5, and the House passed them June 9. Representative Mike Schaufler (D–Happy Valley) broke with Democrats and voted against both bills, but Rep. Greg Smith (R–Heppner) supported HB 2649, and Rep. Bob Jenson (R–Pendleton) voted for both bills. On June 10, despite expectations that the bills would pass the Senate as easily as they did the House, they "crashed in dramatic fashion" when Senator Mark Hass (D–Beaverton), believing the proposed tax increases should be temporary, joined Republicans and voted against HB 3405. Because no Republicans supported the bill, all 18 Democrats were needed to pass the bill, but Hass's rejection left only 17 votes of approval. The Senate tabled both bills and started negotiations. On June 11, after Hass promised his support of both bills if some revenue from the corporate tax increases were added to the rainy day fund, the Senate voted again and passed both bills. Governor Ted Kulongoski signed them July 20, over a month later.

Opponents of these tax increases said they would worsen Oregon's economy, and they led an effort to force a statewide referendum on these increases. Measures 66 and 67 qualified for the ballot on October 8, and voters passed both measures on January 26, 2010, less than a week before the legislature planned to hold a special session to continue to work on the budget.

Electoral fusion was made possible in Oregon with Senate Bill 326, allowing candidates to list a maximum of three party endorsements on their ballot line. This used to be legal in Oregon until 1958. Some have called this plan "fusion light" to contrast it with electoral fusion as practiced in states like New York, where each candidate gets a ballot line for each party that endorses them. SB 326 also repealed a 2005 law preventing voters who already participated in a party's nominating process from signing an independent candidate's nomination petition for a partisan office. The 2005 law was a response to Ralph Nader's 2004 US presidential candidacy as an independent, raising concerns among Democrats that similar candidates would hurt their chances of being elected. The law drew criticism when Ben Westlund, then an independent member of the state Senate, ran for governor in 2006. He had to wait until after the primary election to start his campaign and verify that the voters who signed his petition hadn't voted in any party's primary.

Other significant new laws passed by the 2009 Legislative Session:

Jobs & Transportation: Passed the Jobs and Transportation Act (the largest jobs bill in Oregon history) with funding for the long-awaited Sunrise Highway Corridor in Clackamas County, Newberg-Dundee Bypass, Woodburn/I-5 Interchange, Highway 62 extension in Medford, Beltline/I-5 Interchange in Eugene, and major new road funding for all Oregon cities and counties. Also allocated $100 to ConnectOregon to improve air, rail, and marine infrastructure.

Health Care: Enacted Healthy Kids Act to provide health insurance to 90,000 uninsured children and 30,000 low-income adults, which resulted in Oregon reducing the number of uninsured children by more than any other state.

Education: Expanded Head Start, Early Head Start, and Relief Nurseries, referred an amendment to the Oregon Constitution to allow state matching funds for K-12 school capital construction (passed by voters as Measure 68 in 2010), and passed record investments in community college facilities on all 17 Oregon campuses.

Business Assistance: Increased loans and created new grant funding for small businesses needing capital, invested in emerging industries, and broadened research and development tax credits.

Public Safety: Restored 24/7 Oregon State Police highway coverage after 15 years of drastic cuts, cracked down on methamphetamine-related metal theft, required DUII offenders to install ignition interlock devices to prevent further drunk driving, protected child abuse funding, and began to shift greater resources to crime prevention.

Environment: Helped businesses and homes become energy efficient, enacted new low carbon fuel standards to improve air quality, and increased protections for Oregon fish and sportfishermen by cracking down on California sea lions.

Veterans: Funded new Veterans Service Officers across Oregon, expanded educational opportunities for veterans, funded an emergency fund for military families, and referred a Constitutional amendment to expand the availability of home loans for veterans (passed by voters as Ballot Measure 70 in 2010).

Human Services: Expanded farmer's market vouchers for low-income families and seniors, provided more school breakfasts and lunches, more summer meals for hungry kids, and Oregon Project Independence for seniors at home.

Civil Rights: Passed the Oregon Workplace Religious Freedom Act to allow greater religious freedom in Oregon workplaces (in 2009) and repealed a 1923 KKK-inspired law that disallowed teachers from wearing religious garb in the classroom (in 2010).

Affordable Housing: The Housing Opportunity Bill created a new trust fund to increase affordable rental housing development, help more Oregonians become home owners, prevent homelessness; and maintain and expand the network of community-based nonprofit housing providers.

Fiscal Responsibility: Required for the first time a pro-active review of Oregon tax breaks each biennium.

Legislative Reform: Reduced the size of the legislative budget and the length of legislative sessions, while increasing public access. Created regular legislative committee days to streamline committee operations during legislative interim periods. Referred to voters a Constitutional amendment to create permanent annual legislative sessions with strict time limits (passed by voters as Ballot Measure 71 in 2010).

=== 2010 supplemental session ===
On January 27, 2010, the day after Measures 66 and 67 passed, Governor Kulongoski said, "It's time to say 'enough' to budgeting from crisis to crisis," and directed the legislature to take up an effort in its supplemental session to reform Oregon's kicker law. Instead of sending surplus revenue back to taxpayers as tax rebates, Kulongoski wants surplus revenue to be directed to a state savings account first, commonly described as a "rainy day fund," to help the state balance its budgets during future recessions. House Speaker Hunt said the legislature will focus on jobs, and said kicker reform is "certainly not on the list of definitive things we plan to accomplish."

== Senate members ==
The Oregon State Senate is composed of 18 Democrats and 12 Republicans. In the last elections, the Democratic Party lost one seat: District 27, in the Bend area. Democrat Ben Westlund, a former Republican, left that seat to seek the statewide Oregon State Treasurer office in the same elections. Despite the loss, the Democrats maintained a three-fifths supermajority in the chamber.

Senate President: Peter Courtney (D–11 Salem)
President Pro Tem: Rick Metsger (D–26 Mt. Hood)
Majority Leader: Richard Devlin (D–19 Tualatin)
Minority Leader: Ted Ferrioli (R–30 John Day)

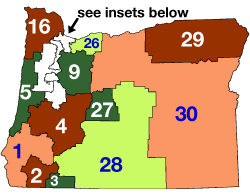
Oregon Senate districts outside the Willamette Valley.

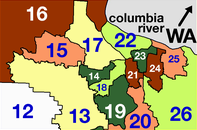
Portland area Senate districts.

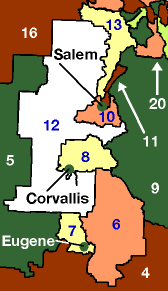
Willamette Valley Senate districts south of Portland area.

District	Home	Senator	Party
1	Roseburg	Jeff Kruse	Republican
2	Central Point	Jason Atkinson	Republican
3	Ashland	Alan C. Bates	Democratic
4	S. Lane/N. Douglas Cos.	Floyd Prozanski	Democratic
5	Coos Bay	Joanne Verger	Democratic
6	Springfield	Bill Morrisette	Democratic
7	Eugene	Vicki Walker/Chris Edwards	Democratic
8	Albany	Frank Morse	Republican
9	Molalla	Fred Girod	Republican
10	Salem	Jackie Winters	Republican
11	Salem	Peter Courtney	Democratic
12	McMinnville	Brian Boquist	Republican
13	Hillsboro	Larry George	Republican
14	Beaverton	Mark Hass	Democratic
15	Hillsboro	Bruce Starr	Republican
16	Scappoose	Betsy Johnson	Democratic
17	Beaverton	Suzanne Bonamici	Democratic
18	Portland	Ginny Burdick	Democratic
19	Tualatin	Richard Devlin	Democratic
20	Canby	vacant	Democratic
20	Canby	Martha Schrader	Democratic
21	Portland	Diane Rosenbaum	Democratic
22	Portland	Margaret Carter	Democratic
23	Portland	Jackie Dingfelder	Democratic
24	Portland	Rod Monroe	Democratic
25	Gresham	Laurie Monnes Anderson	Democratic
26	Mt. Hood	Rick Metsger	Democratic
27	Tumalo	Chris Telfer	Republican
28	Klamath Falls	Doug Whitsett	Republican
29	Pendleton	David Nelson	Republican
30	John Day	Ted Ferrioli	Republican

=== Senate committees ===
Committee assignments were announced December 9, 2008.

Business & Transportation

- Rick Metsger, Chair
- Bruce Starr, Vice Chair
- Joanne Verger
- Larry George
- Peter Courtney

Commerce & Workforce Development

- Diane Rosenbaum, Chair
- Chris Telfer, Vice Chair
- Floyd Prozanski
- Laurie Monnes Anderson
- Larry George

Consumer Protection & Public Affairs

- Suzanne Bonamici, Chair
- Larry George, Vice Chair
- Diane Rosenbaum
- Ginny Burdick
- Fred Girod

Education & General Government

- Mark Hass, Chair
- Frank Morse, Vice Chair
- Rick Metsger
- Suzanne Bonamici
- Jeff Kruse

Environment & Natural Resources

- Jackie Dingfelder, Chair
- Jason Atkinson, Vice Chair
- Floyd Prozanski
- Mark Hass
- Brian Boquist

Finance & Revenue

- Ginny Burdick, Chair
- Frank Morse, Vice Chair
- Diane Rosenbaum
- Mark Hass
- Chris Telfer

Human Services & Rural Health Policy

- Bill Morrisette, Chair
- Jeff Kruse, Vice Chair
- Laurie Monnes Anderson
- Joanne Verger
- Chris Telfer

Health Care & Veterans' Affairs

- Laurie Monnes Anderson, Chair
- Jeff Kruse, Vice Chair
- Alan Bates
- Bill Morrisette
- Frank Morse

Judiciary

- Floyd Prozanski, Chair
- Brian Boquist, Vice Chair
- Suzanne Bonamici
- Jackie Dingfelder
- Doug Whitsett

Rules

- Richard Devlin, Chair
- Ted Ferrioli, Vice Chair
- Ginny Burdick
- Rick Metsger
- Jason Atkinson

== Joint Ways & Means committee ==
Senators

- Margaret Carter, Co-chair
- Betsy Johnson, Vice Chair
- Alan Bates
- Vicki Walker
- Joanne Verger
- Rod Monroe
- Jackie Winters
- David Nelson
- Doug Whitsett
- Fred Girod

Representatives

- Peter Buckley, Co-chair
- Nancy Nathanson, Vice Chair
- David Edwards
- Larry Galizio
- Bill Garrard
- George Gilman
- Bob Jenson
- Betty Komp
- Tina Kotek
- Dennis Richardson
- Chip Shields
- Greg Smith

Human Services Subcommittee

Senators:
- Alan Bates, Co-Chair
- Margaret Carter
- Jackie Winters
Representatives:
- Tina Kotek, Co-Chair
- Mitch Greenlick
- Bill Kennemer
- Carolyn Tomei
- Dennis Richardson

Education Subcommittee

Senators:
- Rod Monroe, Co-Chair
- Richard Devlin
- Fred Girod
Representatives:
- Betty Komp, Co-Chair
- David Edwards
- Larry Galizio
- Greg Smith
- Judy Stiegler
- Gene Whisnant

General Government Subcommittee

Senators:
- Jackie Winters, Co-Chair
- Betsy Johnson
- Peter Courtney
Representatives:
- Nancy Nathanson, Co-Chair
- Bill Garrard
- Chris Harker
- Dennis Richardson
- Jefferson Smith

Capital Construction & Information
Technology Subcommittee

Senators:
- Peter Courtney, Co-Chair
- Margaret Carter
- David Nelson
Representatives:
- Larry Galizio, Co-Chair
- Bill Garrard
- Dave Hunt
- Bob Jenson
- Nancy Nathanson
- Chuck Riley

Natural Resources Subcommittee

Senators:
- Vicki Walker, Co-Chair
- Jackie Dingfelder
- David Nelson
Representatives:
- Bob Jenson, Co-Chair
- Peter Buckley
- Ben Cannon
- Brian Clem
- Chris Edwards
- Jim Thompson

Public Safety Subcommittee

Senators:
- Joanne Verger, Co-Chair
- Vicki Walker
- Doug Whitsett
Representatives:
- Chip Shields, Co-Chair
- Jeff Barker
- Tim Freeman
- Nick Kahl
- Nancy Nathanson
- Greg Smith

Transportation & Economic
Development Subcommittee

Senators:
- Betsy Johnson, Co-Chair
- Rod Monroe
- Bruce Starr
Representatives:
- David Edwards, Co-Chair
- Terry Beyer
- George Gilman
- Mike Schaufler
- Kim Thatcher
- Brad Witt

== House members ==
The Oregon House of Representatives is composed of 36 Democrats and 24 Republicans. Democrats gained five seats over the previous session, in which they had a slim 31–29 majority; the gain is the greatest accomplished by either party since at least 1985. The 36-seat threshold is a significant one, as it gives Democrats a three-fifths supermajority in the chamber and allows them to pass bills which will raise taxes or fees without Republican support.

Speaker: Dave Hunt (D–40 Gladstone)
Speaker Pro Tem: Arnie Roblan (D–9 Coos Bay)
Majority Leader: Mary Nolan (D–36 Portland)
Co-chair of Ways and Means: Peter Buckley (D–5 Ashland)
Majority Whip: Tina Kotek (D–44 Portland)
Deputy Majority Whip: Tobias Read (D–27 Washington County)
Assistant Majority Leader (Policy): Sara Gelser (D–16 Corvallis)
Assistant Majority Leader (Political): Phil Barnhart (D–11 Eugene)

Republican Minority Leader: Bruce Hanna (R–7 Roseburg)
Deputy Republican Leader: Kevin Cameron (R–19 Salem)
Republican Whip: Ron Maurer (R–3 Grants Pass)
Deputy Republican Whip: TBD

District	Home	Representative	Party
1	Gold Beach	Wayne Krieger	Republican
2	Roseburg	Tim Freeman	Republican
3	Grants Pass	Ron Maurer	Republican
4	Central Point	Dennis Richardson	Republican
5	Ashland	Peter Buckley	Democratic
6	Medford	Sal Esquivel	Republican
7	Roseburg	Bruce Hanna	Republican
8	Eugene	Paul Holvey	Democratic
9	Coos Bay	Arnie Roblan	Democratic
10	Newport	Jean Cowan	Democratic
11	Central Linn/Lane Cos.	Phil Barnhart	Democratic
12	Springfield	Terry Beyer	Democratic
13	Eugene	Nancy Nathanson	Democratic
14	Eugene	Chris Edwards/Val Hoyle	Democratic
15	Albany	Andy Olson	Republican
16	Corvallis	Sara Gelser	Democratic
17	Scio	Sherrie Sprenger	Republican
18	Silverton	Vic Gilliam	Republican
19	Salem	Kevin Cameron	Republican
20	Salem	Vicki Berger	Republican
21	Salem	Brian L. Clem	Democratic
22	Woodburn	Betty Komp	Democratic
23	Dallas	Jim Thompson	Republican
24	McMinnville	Jim Weidner	Republican
25	Keizer	Kim Thatcher	Republican
26	Wilsonville	Matt Wingard	Republican
27	Washington Co.	Tobias Read	Democratic
28	Aloha	Jeff Barker	Democratic
29	Hillsboro	Chuck Riley	Democratic
30	Hillsboro	David Edwards	Democratic
31	Clatskanie	Brad Witt	Democratic
32	Cannon Beach	Deborah Boone	Democratic
33	Portland	Mitch Greenlick	Democratic
34	Washington Co.	Chris Harker	Democratic
35	Tigard	Larry Galizio	Democratic
36	Portland	Mary Nolan	Democratic
37	West Linn	Scott Bruun	Republican
38	Lake Oswego	Chris Garrett	Democratic
39	Oregon City	Bill Kennemer	Republican
40	Gladstone	Dave Hunt	Democratic
41	Milwaukie	Carolyn Tomei	Democratic
42	Portland	Jules Bailey	Democratic
43	Portland	Chip Shields	Democratic
44	Portland	Tina Kotek	Democratic
45	Portland	Michael Dembrow	Democratic
46	Portland	Ben Cannon	Democratic
47	Portland	Jefferson Smith	Democratic
48	Happy Valley	Mike Schaufler	Democratic
49	Wood Village	Nick Kahl	Democratic
50	Gresham	Greg Matthews	Democratic
51	Clackamas	Brent Barton	Democratic
52	Corbett	Suzanne VanOrman	Democratic
53	Sunriver	Gene Whisnant	Republican
54	Bend	Judy Stiegler	Democratic
55	Bend	George Gilman	Republican
56	Klamath Falls	Bill Garrard	Republican
57	Heppner	Greg Smith	Republican
58	Pendleton	Bob Jenson	Republican
59	The Dalles	John Huffman	Republican
60	Ontario	Cliff Bentz	Republican

== House committees ==
Agriculture, Natural Resources and Rural Communities

- Brian Clem, Chair
- Suzanne VanOrman, Vice Chair
- Wayne Krieger, Vice Chair
- Terry Beyer
- Vic Gilliam
- Arnie Roblan
- Mike Schaufler
- Matt Wingard

Business and Labor Committee

- Mike Schaufler, Chair
- Brent Barton, Vice Chair
- Kevin Cameron, Vice Chair
- Chris Edwards
- Sal Esquivel
- Paul Holvey
- Bill Kennemer
- Greg Matthews
- Kim Thatcher
- Brad Witt

Business and Labor Subcommittee
on Work Force Development

- Brad Witt, Chair
- John Huffman, Vice Chair
- Michael Dembrow
- Sal Esquivel
- Paul Holvey

Consumer Protection Committee

- Paul Holvey, Chair
- Chuck Riley, Vice Chair
- Jim Weidner, Vice Chair
- Brent Barton
- Jean Cowan
- Vic Gilliam
- Wayne Krieger
- Greg Matthews
- Carolyn Tomei
- Matt Wingard

Education Committee

- Sara Gelser, Chair
- Michael Dembrow, Vice Chair
- Sherrie Sprenger, Vice Chair
- Chris Harker
- John Huffman
- Betty Komp
- Ron Maurer
- Arnie Roblan
- Kim Thatcher
- Suzanne VanOrman

Environment and Water Committee

- Ben Cannon, Chair
- Jefferson Smith, Vice Chair
- Vic Gilliam, Vice Chair
- Jules Bailey
- Phil Barnhart
- Cliff Bentz
- Debbie Boone
- Bob Jenson

Health Care Committee

- Mitch Greenlick, Chair
- Chris Harker, Vice Chair
- Ron Maurer, Vice Chair
- Scott Bruun
- Ben Cannon
- Chris Garrett
- Michael Dembrow
- Bill Kennemer
- Tina Kotek
- Jim Thompson

House Administration Committee

- Arnie Roblan, Chair
- Bruce Hanna, Vice Chair
- Kevin Cameron
- Dave Hunt
- Betty Komp
- Mary Nolan
- Andy Olson

Human Services Committee

- Carolyn Tomei, Chair
- Debbie Boone, Vice Chair
- Andy Olson, Vice Chair
- Jean Cowan
- Brian Clem
- Michael Dembrow
- Tim Freeman
- John Huffman
- Ron Maurer
- Suzanne VanOrman

Judiciary Committee

- Jeff Barker, Chair
- Judy Stiegler, Vice Chair
- Gene Whisnant, Vice Chair
- Brent Barton
- Kevin Cameron
- Chris Garrett
- Wayne Krieger
- Andy Olson
- Chip Shields
- Jefferson Smith

Land Use Committee

- Mary Nolan, Chair
- Chris Garrett, Vice Chair
- Sal Esquivel, Vice Chair
- Brian Clem
- Jean Cowan
- Mitch Greenlick
- Bruce Hanna
- Matt Wingard

Sustainability and Economic
Development Committee

- Tobias Read, Chair
- Larry Galizio, Vice Chair
- Scott Bruun, Vice Chair
- Jules Bailey
- Vic Gilliam
- Chris Harker
- Matt Wingard
- Brad Witt

Transportation Committee

- Terry Beyer, Chair
- Nick Kahl, Vice Chair
- George Gilman, Vice Chair
- Jules Bailey
- Cliff Bentz
- Vicki Berger
- Debbie Boone
- David Edwards
- Mike Schaufler
- Jim Weidner

Revenue Committee

- Phil Barnhart, Chair
- Jules Bailey, Vice Chair
- Cliff Bentz, Vice Chair
- Chuck Riley
- Sara Gelser
- Tobias Read
- Nick Kahl
- Sherrie Sprenger
- Scott Bruun
- Vicki Berger

Rules Committee

- Arnie Roblan, Chair
- Chris Edwards, Vice Chair
- Vicki Berger, Vice Chair
- Bill Garrard
- Sara Gelser
- Bob Jenson
- Mary Nolan
- Tobias Read

Veterans and Emergency
Services Committee

- Jean Cowan, Chair
- Greg Matthews, Vice Chair
- Tim Freeman, Vice Chair
- Debbie Boone
- Sal Esquivel
- Betty Komp
- Chuck Riley
- Jim Weidner

== See also ==
- Oregon legislative elections, 2008

Preceded by 74th legislature	Seventy-fifth Oregon Legislative Assembly; 2009–2010	Succeeded by 76th legislature
