= 2008 Oregon legislative election =

Oregon legislative elections, 2008
- November 4, 2008

16 seats of the Oregon State Senate and 60 seats of the Oregon House of Representatives
	Majority party	Minority party
Party	Democratic	Republican
Seats before	50 (19 in Senate, 31 in House)	40 (11 Senate, 29 House)
Seats after	54 (18 in Senate, 36 in House)	36 (12 Senate, 24 House)
Seat change	▲4 ▼1 in Senate, ▲5 in House	▼4 ▲1 in Senate, ▼5 in House

Elections for the 75th Oregon Legislative Assembly took place in 2008. The Republican and Democratic primary elections were on May 20, 2008, and the general election was held on November 4, 2008. Fifteen of the Oregon State Senate's thirty seats were up for election, as were all 60 seats of the Oregon House of Representatives.

In the general election, there were 39 races with both Democratic and Republican candidates; 24 were in districts previously represented by a Republican, 15 in districts previously represented by Democrats. Sixteen Democrats ran without a Republican opponent, and five Republicans ran without a Democratic opponent.

Eighteen incumbent House members and six incumbent Senators earned enough write-in votes in the opposing party's primary to earn a dual endorsement.

== Oregon Senate ==
2008 Oregon State Senate elections
- November 4, 2008

16 of 30 seats in the Oregon State Senate 16 seats needed for a majority
	Majority party	Minority party
Party	Democratic	Republican
Seats before	19	11
Seats after	18	12
Seat change	▼1	▲1
- Results of the elections: Republican gain Democratic hold Republican hold No election

=== Predictions ===
Source	Ranking	As of
Stateline	Safe D	October 15, 2008

Every two years, half of the state senate seats come up for election. In 2008 there was also an election for District 17, resulting from Senator Brad Avakian's appointment to Oregon Labor Commissioner. Thus, 16 seats were up for election.

Nine of the 16 Senate seats up for election were previously held by Democrats. Four of these races had both Democratic and Republican candidates in the general election. The other seven seats were previously held by Republicans, and four of them were contested by both major parties. Democrats lost one seat (District 27 in the Bend area) to the Republican Party, and went into 2009 with a majority of 18 seats to the Republicans' 12. Except where footnoted, candidates were unopposed in their party's primary.

District	Party	Incumbent	Status	Party	Candidate	Votes	%
1	Republican	Jeff Kruse of Roseburg	Re-elected	Republican	Jeff Kruse	38,366	69.69
1	Republican	Jeff Kruse of Roseburg	Re-elected	Democratic	Eldon Rollins	16,461	29.90
1	Republican	Jeff Kruse of Roseburg	Re-elected		write-ins	229	0.42
2	Republican	Jason Atkinson of Central Point	Re-elected	Republican	Jason Atkinson	39,265	68.81
2	Republican	Jason Atkinson of Central Point	Re-elected	Democratic	Richard Koopmans	17,570	30.79
2	Republican	Jason Atkinson of Central Point	Re-elected		write-ins	224	0.39
5	Democratic	Joanne Verger of Coos Bay	Re-elected	Democratic	Joanne Verger	40,012	96.77
5	Democratic	Joanne Verger of Coos Bay	Re-elected		write-ins	1,337	3.23
9	Republican	Fred Girod of Stayton	Re-elected	Republican	Fred Girod	31,201	61.09
9	Republican	Fred Girod of Stayton	Re-elected	Democratic	Bob McDonald	19,753	38.68
9	Republican	Fred Girod of Stayton	Re-elected		write-ins	116	0.23
12	Republican	Gary George of Newberg	Retired	Republican	Brian Boquist	33,264	60.62
12	Republican	Gary George of Newberg	Retired	Democratic	Kevin Nortness	21,480	39.14
12	Republican	Gary George of Newberg	Retired		write-ins	130	0.24
14	Democratic	Mark Hass of Beaverton	Re-elected	Democratic	Mark Hass	35,847	67.79
14	Democratic	Mark Hass of Beaverton	Re-elected	Republican	Lisa Michaels	16,850	31.86
14	Democratic	Mark Hass of Beaverton	Re-elected		write-ins	186	0.35
17	Democratic	Suzanne Bonamici of Portland	Re-elected	Democratic	Suzanne Bonamici	44,475	96.90
17	Democratic	Suzanne Bonamici of Portland	Re-elected		write-ins	1,423	3.10
18	Democratic	Ginny Burdick of Portland	Re-elected	Democratic	Ginny Burdick	41,916	69.96
18	Democratic	Ginny Burdick of Portland	Re-elected	Republican	John Wight	17,809	29.72
18	Democratic	Ginny Burdick of Portland	Re-elected		write-ins	189	0.32
21	Democratic	Kate Brown of Milwaukie	Retired	Democratic	Diane Rosenbaum	49,149	97.67
21	Democratic	Kate Brown of Milwaukie	Retired		write-ins	1,172	2.33
22	Democratic	Margaret Carter of Portland	Re-elected	Democratic	Margaret Carter	48,939	98.15
22	Democratic	Margaret Carter of Portland	Re-elected		write-ins	921	1.85
23	Democratic	Avel Gordly of Portland	Retired	Democratic	Jackie Dingfelder	44,631	97.68
23	Democratic	Avel Gordly of Portland	Retired		write-ins	1,058	2.32
25	Democratic	Laurie Monnes Anderson of Gresham	Re-elected	Democratic	L. M. Anderson	27,013	58.45
25	Democratic	Laurie Monnes Anderson of Gresham	Re-elected	Republican	Dave Kim	19,036	41.19
25	Democratic	Laurie Monnes Anderson of Gresham	Re-elected		write-ins	167	0.18
27	Democratic	Ben Westlund of Bend	Retired	Republican	Chris Telfer	42,061	59.60
27	Democratic	Ben Westlund of Bend	Retired	Democratic	Maren Lundgren	28,379	40.21
27	Democratic	Ben Westlund of Bend	Retired		write-ins	129	0.18
28	Republican	Doug Whitsett of Klamath Falls	Re-elected	Republican	Doug Whitsett	39,416	97.65
28	Republican	Doug Whitsett of Klamath Falls	Re-elected		write-ins	949	2.35
29	Republican	David Nelson of Pendleton	Re-elected	Republican	David Nelson	32,747	98.13
29	Republican	David Nelson of Pendleton	Re-elected		write-ins	623	1.87
30	Republican	Ted Ferrioli of John Day	Re-elected	Republican	Ted Ferrioli	35,606	97.91
30	Republican	Ted Ferrioli of John Day	Re-elected		write-ins	760	2.09

== House of Representatives ==
2008 Oregon House of Representatives elections
- November 4, 2008

60 seats of the Oregon House of Representatives 31 seats needed for a majority
	Majority party	Minority party
Party	Democratic	Republican
Seats before	31	29
Seats after	36	24
Seat change	▲5	▼5
- Results: Democratic gain Democratic hold Republican hold

=== Predictions ===
Source	Ranking	As of
Stateline	Likely D	October 15, 2008

Every two years, all of the state house seats come up for election. Democrats gained five seats from the previous session: two in open seats and three in defeating incumbent Republicans. Except where footnoted, candidates were unopposed in their party's primary.

District	Party	Incumbent	Status	Party	Candidate	Votes	%
1	Republican	Wayne Krieger of Gold Beach	Re-elected	Republican	Wayne Krieger'	17,590	
1	Republican	Wayne Krieger of Gold Beach	Re-elected	Democratic	Richard (Rick) Goche	11,357	
1	Republican	Wayne Krieger of Gold Beach	Re-elected		write-ins		
2	Republican	Susan Morgan of Myrtle Creek	Retired	Republican	Tim Freeman	16,780	
2	Republican	Susan Morgan of Myrtle Creek	Retired	Democratic	Harry McDermott	9,143	
2	Republican	Susan Morgan of Myrtle Creek	Retired		write-ins		
3	Republican	Ron Maurer of Grants Pass	Re-elected	Republican	Ron Maurer	16,982	
3	Republican	Ron Maurer of Grants Pass	Re-elected	Democratic	Julie Rubenstein	10,674	
3	Republican	Ron Maurer of Grants Pass	Re-elected		write-ins		
4	Republican	Dennis Richardson of Central Point	Re-elected	Republican	Dennis Richardson	19,641	
4	Republican	Dennis Richardson of Central Point	Re-elected	Independent Party	Keith Wangle	8,053	
4	Republican	Dennis Richardson of Central Point	Re-elected		write-ins		
5	Democratic	Peter Buckley of Ashland	Re-elected	Democratic	Peter Buckley	18,452	
5	Democratic	Peter Buckley of Ashland	Re-elected	Independent Party	Pete Belcasto	11,653	
5	Democratic	Peter Buckley of Ashland	Re-elected		write-ins		
6	Republican	Sal Esquivel of Medford	Re-elected	Republican	Sal Esquivel	14,622	
6	Republican	Sal Esquivel of Medford	Re-elected	Democratic	Lynn Howe	12,638	
6	Republican	Sal Esquivel of Medford	Re-elected		write-ins		
7	Republican	Bruce Hanna of Roseburg	Re-elected	Republican	Bruce Hanna	17,614	
7	Republican	Bruce Hanna of Roseburg	Re-elected	Democratic	Donald Nordin	9,954	
7	Republican	Bruce Hanna of Roseburg	Re-elected		write-ins		
8	Democratic	Paul Holvey of Eugene	Re-elected	Democratic	Paul Holvey	23,366	
8	Democratic	Paul Holvey of Eugene	Re-elected		write-ins		
9	Democratic	Arnie Roblan of Coos Bay	Re-elected	Democratic	Arnie Roblan	15,444	
9	Democratic	Arnie Roblan of Coos Bay	Re-elected	Republican	Al Pearn	11,365	
9	Democratic	Arnie Roblan of Coos Bay	Re-elected		write-ins		
10	Democratic	Jean Cowan of Newport	Re-elected	Democratic	Jean Cowan	19,829	
10	Democratic	Jean Cowan of Newport	Re-elected		write-ins		
11	Democratic	Phil Barnhart of Eugene	Re-elected	Democratic	Phil Barnhart	22,260	
11	Democratic	Phil Barnhart of Eugene	Re-elected		write-ins		
12	Democratic	Terry Beyer of Springfield	Re-elected	Democratic	Terry Beyer	14,800	
12	Democratic	Terry Beyer of Springfield	Re-elected	Republican	Sean MP VanGordon	7,554	
12	Democratic	Terry Beyer of Springfield	Re-elected		write-ins		
13	Democratic	Nancy Nathanson of Eugene	Re-elected	Democratic	Nancy Nathanson	22,899	
13	Democratic	Nancy Nathanson of Eugene	Re-elected		write-ins		
14	Democratic	Chris Edwards of Eugene	Re-elected	Democratic	Chris Edwards	20,552	
14	Democratic	Chris Edwards of Eugene	Re-elected		write-ins		
15	Republican	Andy Olson of Albany	Re-elected	Republican	Andy Olson	18,808	
15	Republican	Andy Olson of Albany	Re-elected	Democratic	Dick Olsen	10,971	
15	Republican	Andy Olson of Albany	Re-elected		write-ins		
16	Democratic	Sara Gelser of Corvallis	Re-elected	Democratic	Sara Gelser		
16	Democratic	Sara Gelser of Corvallis	Re-elected		write-ins		
17	Republican	Sherrie Sprenger of Scio	Re-elected	Republican	Sherrie Sprenger		
17	Republican	Sherrie Sprenger of Scio	Re-elected	Democratic	Dan Thackaberry		
17	Republican	Sherrie Sprenger of Scio	Re-elected		write-ins		
18	Republican	Vic Gilliam of Silverton	Re-elected	Republican	Vic Gilliam		
18	Republican	Vic Gilliam of Silverton	Re-elected	Democratic	Jim Gilbert		
18	Republican	Vic Gilliam of Silverton	Re-elected		write-ins		
19	Republican	Kevin Cameron of Salem	Re-elected	Republican	Kevin Cameron		
19	Republican	Kevin Cameron of Salem	Re-elected	Democratic	Hanten (HD) Day		
19	Republican	Kevin Cameron of Salem	Re-elected		write-ins		
20	Republican	Vicki Berger of Salem	Re-elected	Republican	Vicki Berger		
20	Republican	Vicki Berger of Salem	Re-elected	Democratic	Richard Riggs		
20	Republican	Vicki Berger of Salem	Re-elected		write-ins		
21	Democratic	Brian Clem of Salem	Re-elected	Democratic	Brian Clem		
21	Democratic	Brian Clem of Salem	Re-elected		write-ins		
22	Democratic	Betty Komp of Woodburn	Re-elected	Democratic	Betty Komp		
22	Democratic	Betty Komp of Woodburn	Re-elected	Republican	Tom M. Chereck, Jr.		
22	Democratic	Betty Komp of Woodburn	Re-elected		write-ins		
23	Republican	Brian Boquist of Dallas	Retired	Republican	Jim Thompson		
23	Republican	Brian Boquist of Dallas	Retired	Democratic	Jason Brown		
23	Republican	Brian Boquist of Dallas	Retired		write-ins		
24	Republican	Donna G. Nelson of McMinnville	Retired	Republican	Jim Weidner		
24	Republican	Donna G. Nelson of McMinnville	Retired	Democratic	Bernt (Al) Hansen		
24	Republican	Donna G. Nelson of McMinnville	Retired		write-ins		
25	Republican	Kim Thatcher of Keizer	Re-elected	Republican	Kim Thatcher		
25	Republican	Kim Thatcher of Keizer	Re-elected		write-ins		
26	Republican	Matt Wingard of Wilsonville	Re-elected	Republican	Matt Wingard		
26	Republican	Matt Wingard of Wilsonville	Re-elected	Democratic	Jessica Adamson		
26	Republican	Matt Wingard of Wilsonville	Re-elected	Libertarian	Marc Delphine		
26	Republican	Matt Wingard of Wilsonville	Re-elected		write-ins		
27	Democratic	Tobias Read of Beaverton	Re-elected	Democratic	Tobias Read		
27	Democratic	Tobias Read of Beaverton	Re-elected	Republican	Michael F. DeVietro		
27	Democratic	Tobias Read of Beaverton	Re-elected		write-ins		
28	Democratic	Jeff Barker of Aloha	Re-elected	Democratic	Jeff Barker		
28	Democratic	Jeff Barker of Aloha	Re-elected		write-ins		
29	Democratic	Chuck Riley of Hillsboro	Re-elected	Democratic	Chuck Riley		
29	Democratic	Chuck Riley of Hillsboro	Re-elected	Independent Party	Terry L. Rilling		
29	Democratic	Chuck Riley of Hillsboro	Re-elected		write-ins		
30	Democratic	David Edwards of Hillsboro	Re-elected	Democratic	David Edwards		
30	Democratic	David Edwards of Hillsboro	Re-elected	Republican	Andy Duyck		
30	Democratic	David Edwards of Hillsboro	Re-elected	Constitution	Ken Cunningham		
30	Democratic	David Edwards of Hillsboro	Re-elected		write-ins		
31	Democratic	Brad Witt of Clatskanie	Re-elected	Democratic	Brad Witt		
31	Democratic	Brad Witt of Clatskanie	Re-elected		write-ins		
32	Democratic	Deborah Boone of Cannon Beach	Re-elected	Democratic	Deborah Boone		
32	Democratic	Deborah Boone of Cannon Beach	Re-elected	Republican	Tim Bero		
32	Democratic	Deborah Boone of Cannon Beach	Re-elected		write-ins		
33	Democratic	Mitch Greenlick of Portland	Re-elected	Democratic	Mitch Greenlick		
33	Democratic	Mitch Greenlick of Portland	Re-elected	Republican	James (Jim) Ellison		
33	Democratic	Mitch Greenlick of Portland	Re-elected		write-ins		
34	Democratic	Chris Harker of Beaverton	Re-elected	Democratic	Chris Harker		
34	Democratic	Chris Harker of Beaverton	Re-elected	Republican	Piotr Kuklinski		
34	Democratic	Chris Harker of Beaverton	Re-elected		write-ins		
35	Democratic	Larry Galizio of Tigard	Re-elected	Democratic	Larry Galizio		
35	Democratic	Larry Galizio of Tigard	Re-elected	Republican	Tony Marino		
35	Democratic	Larry Galizio of Tigard	Re-elected		write-ins		
36	Democratic	Mary Nolan of Portland	Re-elected	Democratic	Mary Nolan		
36	Democratic	Mary Nolan of Portland	Re-elected	Republican	Steve Oppenheim		
36	Democratic	Mary Nolan of Portland	Re-elected	Libertarian	Jay A. Ellefson		
36	Democratic	Mary Nolan of Portland	Re-elected		write-ins		
37	Republican	Scott Bruun of West Linn	Re-elected	Republican	Scott Bruun		
37	Republican	Scott Bruun of West Linn	Re-elected	Democratic	Michele Eberle		
37	Republican	Scott Bruun of West Linn	Re-elected		write-ins		
38	Democratic	Greg Macpherson of Lake Oswego	Retired	Democratic	Chris Garrett		
38	Democratic	Greg Macpherson of Lake Oswego	Retired	Republican	Steve Griffith		
38	Democratic	Greg Macpherson of Lake Oswego	Retired		write-ins		
39	Republican	Wayne Scott of Oregon City	Retired	Republican	Bill Kennemer		
39	Republican	Wayne Scott of Oregon City	Retired	Democratic	Toby Forsberg		
39	Republican	Wayne Scott of Oregon City	Retired		write-ins		
40	Democratic	Dave Hunt of Gladstone	Re-elected	Democratic	Dave Hunt		
40	Democratic	Dave Hunt of Gladstone	Re-elected		write-ins		
41	Democratic	Carolyn Tomei of Milwaukie	Re-elected	Democratic	Carolyn Tomei		
41	Democratic	Carolyn Tomei of Milwaukie	Re-elected	Republican	Randy Uchytil		
41	Democratic	Carolyn Tomei of Milwaukie	Re-elected		write-ins		
42	Democratic	Diane Rosenbaum of Portland	Retired	Democratic	Jules Kopel-Bailey		
42	Democratic	Diane Rosenbaum of Portland	Retired	Pacific Green	Chris Extine		
42	Democratic	Diane Rosenbaum of Portland	Retired		write-ins		
43	Democratic	Chip Shields of Portland	Re-elected	Democratic	Chip Shields		
43	Democratic	Chip Shields of Portland	Re-elected		write-ins		
44	Democratic	Tina Kotek of Portland	Re-elected	Democratic	Tina Kotek		
44	Democratic	Tina Kotek of Portland	Re-elected		write-ins		
45	Democratic	Michael Dembrow of Portland	Re-elected	Democratic	Michael Dembrow		
45	Democratic	Michael Dembrow of Portland	Re-elected	Libertarian	Jim Karlock		
45	Democratic	Michael Dembrow of Portland	Re-elected		write-ins		
46	Democratic	Ben Cannon of Portland	Re-elected	Democratic	Ben Cannon		
46	Democratic	Ben Cannon of Portland	Re-elected		write-ins		
47	Democratic	Jeff Merkley of Portland	Retired	Democratic	Jefferson Smith		
47	Democratic	Jeff Merkley of Portland	Retired		write-ins		
48	Democratic	Mike Schaufler of Happy Valley	Re-elected	Democratic	Mike Schaufler		
48	Democratic	Mike Schaufler of Happy Valley	Re-elected		write-ins		
49	Republican	Karen Minnis of Wood Village	Retired	Democratic	Nick Kahl		
49	Republican	Karen Minnis of Wood Village	Retired	Republican	John Nelsen		
49	Republican	Karen Minnis of Wood Village	Retired		write-ins		
50	Republican	John Lim of Gresham	Lost re-election	Democratic	Greg Matthews		
50	Republican	John Lim of Gresham	Lost re-election	Republican	John Lim		
50	Republican	John Lim of Gresham	Lost re-election		write-ins		
51	Republican	Linda Flores of Clackamas	Lost re-election	Democratic	Brent Barton		
51	Republican	Linda Flores of Clackamas	Lost re-election	Republican	Linda Flores		
51	Republican	Linda Flores of Clackamas	Lost re-election		write-ins		
52	Republican	Patti Smith of Corbett	Retired	Democratic	Suzanne VanOrman		
52	Republican	Patti Smith of Corbett	Retired	Republican	Matt Lindland		
52	Republican	Patti Smith of Corbett	Retired		write-ins		
53	Republican	Gene Whisnant of Sunriver	Re-elected	Republican	Gene Whisnant		
53	Republican	Gene Whisnant of Sunriver	Re-elected	Democratic	Conrad Ruel		
53	Republican	Gene Whisnant of Sunriver	Re-elected		write-ins		
54	Republican	Chuck Burley of Bend	Lost re-election	Democratic	Judy Stiegler		
54	Republican	Chuck Burley of Bend	Lost re-election	Republican	Chuck Burley		
54	Republican	Chuck Burley of Bend	Lost re-election		write-ins		
55	Republican	George Gilman of Bend	Re-elected	Republican	George Gilman		
55	Republican	George Gilman of Bend	Re-elected		write-ins		
56	Republican	Bill Garrard of Klamath Falls	Re-elected	Republican	Bill Garrard		
56	Republican	Bill Garrard of Klamath Falls	Re-elected		write-ins		
57	Republican	Greg Smith of Heppner	Re-elected	Republican	Greg Smith		
57	Republican	Greg Smith of Heppner	Re-elected	Democratic	Jerome (Jerry) Sebestyen		
57	Republican	Greg Smith of Heppner	Re-elected		write-ins		
58	Republican	Bob Jenson of Pendleton	Re-elected	Republican	Bob Jenson		
58	Republican	Bob Jenson of Pendleton	Re-elected	Democratic	Ben Talley		
58	Republican	Bob Jenson of Pendleton	Re-elected		write-ins		
59	Republican	John Huffman of The Dalles	Re-elected	Republican	John Huffman		
59	Republican	John Huffman of The Dalles	Re-elected	Democratic	Mike Ahern		
59	Republican	John Huffman of The Dalles	Re-elected		write-ins		
60	Republican	Cliff Bentz of Ontario	Re-elected	Republican	Cliff Bentz		
60	Republican	Cliff Bentz of Ontario	Re-elected		write-ins		
