= Oregon's 42nd House district =

Legislative districts in the state of Oregon

Oregon's 42nd House district after redistricting after the 2020 Census

District 42 of the Oregon House of Representatives is one of 60 House legislative districts in the state of Oregon. As of 2021, the district is contained entirely within Multnomah County and includes much of inner southeast Portland, including the neighborhoods of Brooklyn, Buckman, Creston-Kenilworth, Hosford-Abernethy, Kerns, Laurelhurst, Richmond, and Sunnyside. The current representative for the district is Democrat Rob Nosse of Portland.

== Election results ==
District boundaries have changed over time. Therefore, representatives before 2021 may not represent the same constituency as today. General election results from 2000 to present are as follows:

Year	Candidate	Party	Percent	Opponent	Party	Percent	Opponent	Party	Percent	Opponent	Party	Percent	Write-in percentage
2000	Bill Morrissette	Democratic	100.00%	Unopposed									
2002 (Note: Diane Rosenbaum was the incumbent in this election. She previously represented District 14, but was moved to this district due to redistricting following the 2000 United States census.)	Diane Rosenbaum	Democratic	81.73%	Theresa Reed	Libertarian	9.62%	Charley Nims	Socialist	7.47%	No fourth candidate			1.18%
2004	Diane Rosenbaum	Democratic	82.42%	Charles Fall	Pacific Green	8.23%	Susan Detlefsen	Libertarian	5.58%	Ronald Morgan	Socialist	3.02%	0.75%
2006	Diane Rosenbaum	Democratic	83.53%	Jeff Cropp	Pacific Green	15.84%	No third candidate			No fourth candidate			0.63%
2008	Jules Kopel-Bailey	Democratic	85.63%	Chris Extine	Pacific Green	13.62%	No third candidate			No fourth candidate			0.75%
2010	Jules Kopel-Bailey	Democratic	84.74%	Cliff Hutchison	Republican	9.52%	Chris Extine	Pacific Green	5.40%	No fourth candidate			0.34%
2012	Jules Kopel-Bailey	Democratic	97.72%	Unopposed									2.28%
2014 (Note: Rob Nosse was the incumbent in this election. He was appointed to this seat on June 26, 2014 to replace Jules Kopel-Bailey, who resigned from office to take a seat on the Multnomah County Commission.)	Rob Nosse	Democratic	90.64%	Bruce Alexander Knight	Libertarian	8.59%	No third candidate			No fourth candidate			0.77%
2018	Rob Nosse	Democratic	88.71%	James Stubbs	Independent	6.44%	Jeremy Wilson	Libertarian	4.55%	No fourth candidate			0.30%
2018	Rob Nosse	Democratic	93.68%	Bruce Alexander Knight	Libertarian	6.04%	No third candidate			No fourth candidate			0.28%
2020	Rob Nosse	Democratic	99.04%	Unopposed									0.96%
2022	Rob Nosse	Democratic	91.52%	Scott Trahan	Republican	6.68%	Shira Newman	Libertarian	1.63%	No fourth candidate			0.17%
2024	Rob Nosse	Democratic	98.5%	Unopposed									1.5%

== See also ==
- Oregon Legislative Assembly
- Oregon House of Representatives
