= Laurie Anderson (disambiguation) =

Laurie Anderson (born 1947) is an American avant-garde artist, composer, musician and film director.

Laurie Anderson may also refer to:

- Laurie Monnes Anderson (born 1945), American politician
- Laurie Halse Anderson (born 1961), American author
