= Rob Nosse =

American politician (born 1967)

The Honorable Rob Nosse
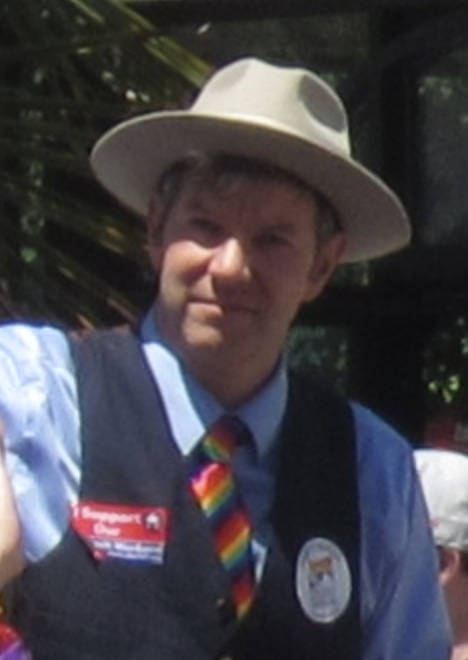

Majority Whip of the Oregon House of Representatives
- Incumbent
- Assumed office 2019

Member of the Oregon House of Representatives from the 42nd district
- Incumbent
- Assumed office July 7, 2014
- Preceded by: Jules Bailey

Personal details
- Born: 1967 (58–59 years old) Marion, Ohio, U.S.
- Party: Democratic
- Spouse: Jim Laden
- Children: 2
- Education: Miami University
- Profession: Labor organizer
- Website: Legislative website
- Rob Nosse's voice Nosse in an interview before the 2020 Oregon House of Representatives election Recorded April 20, 2020

Robert Nosse (born 1967) is an American politician who serves as a member of the Oregon House of Representatives. He represents District 42, which includes parts of Southeast and Northeast Portland.

== Early life and education ==
Rob Nosse was born in Ohio and is of Slovenian descent. He attended and graduated from Miami University of Ohio. He moved to Oregon in 1992 to lead the Oregon Student Association. He is a labor organizer for the Oregon Nurses Association

== Political career ==
Nosse announced his candidacy for the District 42 seat in the Oregon House of Representatives in 2013 after the incumbent, Jules Bailey, chose to run for a seat on the Multnomah County Commission. In the May 2014 primary election, Nosse defeated five other candidates for the Democratic nomination, winning 48.9 percent of the vote. Nosse did not face a Republican opponent in the November 2014 election.

After the May 2014 election, Jules Bailey resigned from the Oregon House of Representatives to assume his new position as a County Commissioner. The Multnomah County Commission appointed Nosse to the seat for the remainder of Bailey's term, allowing Nosse to take office immediately while running for election to a full term. Nosse was elected to a term in his own right in November 2014.

== Personal life ==
Nosse is openly gay and lives in southeast Portland with his husband, Jim Laden. The couple have two children and one grandchild.

== Electoral history ==
2014 Oregon State Representative, 42nd district
Party	Candidate	Votes	%
Democratic	Rob Nosse	26,321	90.6
Libertarian	Bruce Alexander Knight	2,493	8.6
Write-in		225	0.8
Total votes		29,039	100%

2016 Oregon State Representative, 42nd district
Party	Candidate	Votes	%
Democratic	Rob Nosse	33,894	88.7
Independent	James E Stubbs	2,459	6.4
Libertarian	Jeremy Wilson	1,739	4.6
Write-in		115	0.3
Total votes		38,207	100%

2018 Oregon State Representative, 42nd district
Party	Candidate	Votes	%
Democratic	Rob Nosse	37,222	93.7
Libertarian	Bruce Alexander Knight	2,400	6.0
Write-in		110	0.3
Total votes		39,732	100%

2020 Oregon State Representative, 42nd district
Party	Candidate	Votes	%
Democratic	Rob Nosse	40,456	98.2
Write-in		744	1.8
Total votes		41,200	100%

2022 Oregon State Representative, 42nd district
Party	Candidate	Votes	%
Democratic	Rob Nosse	34,777	91.5
Republican	Scott Trahan	2,540	6.7
Libertarian	Shira Newman	619	1.6
Write-in		65	0.2
Total votes		38,001	100%

2024 Oregon State Representative, 42nd district
Party	Candidate	Votes	%
Democratic	Rob Nosse	32,941	98.5
Write-in		491	1.5
Total votes		33,432	100%

== See also ==
- 77th Oregon Legislative Assembly (2013–2014)
