= Jean Cowan =

American Democratic politician

Member of the Oregon House of Representatives from the 10th district
- In office January 2007 – January 14, 2013
- Preceded by: Alan Brown
- Succeeded by: David Gomberg

Personal details
- Born: 1947 (age 78–79) Astoria, Oregon
- Party: Democratic
- Spouse: Pat
- Children: 2
- Education: Marylhurst College

Jean Cowan (born 1947) is an American Democratic politician who served in the Oregon House of Representatives from 2007 until 2013.

== Career ==
Cowan served as city councillor and mayor of Elgin, and then as a Lincoln County Commissioner for 12 years, and served on many state advisory bodies. She was elected to the Oregon House of Representatives in 2006. Cowan was chair of the Veterans and Emergency Services Committee during the 75th Assembly, and co-chair of the Natural Resources Subcommittee during the 76th Assembly. In November 2011, Cowan announced she would not seek reelection to her seat, and was succeeded by fellow Democrat David Gomberg.

== Electoral history ==
2004 Oregon State Representative, 10th district
| Party | Candidate | Votes | % |
|---|---|---|---|
| Republican | Alan Brown | 15,364 | 50.5 |
| Democratic | Jean Cowan | 14,950 | 49.2 |
| Write-in | | 89 | 0.3 |
| Total votes | | 30,403 | 100% |

2006 Oregon State Representative, 10th district
| Party | Candidate | Votes | % |
|---|---|---|---|
| Democratic | Jean Cowan | 12,904 | 51.4 |
| Republican | Alan Brown | 12,112 | 48.3 |
| Write-in | | 68 | 0.3 |
| Total votes | | 25,084 | 100% |

2008 Oregon State Representative, 10th district
| Party | Candidate | Votes | % |
|---|---|---|---|
| Democratic | Jean Cowan | 19,829 | 96.6 |
| Write-in | | 707 | 3.4 |
| Total votes | | 20,536 | 100% |

2010 Oregon State Representative, 10th district
| Party | Candidate | Votes | % |
|---|---|---|---|
| Democratic | Jean Cowan | 14,475 | 58.2 |
| Republican | Becky Lemler | 10,323 | 41.5 |
| Write-in | | 63 | 0.3 |
| Total votes | | 24,861 | 100% |
