= Jules Bailey =

American politician (born 1979)

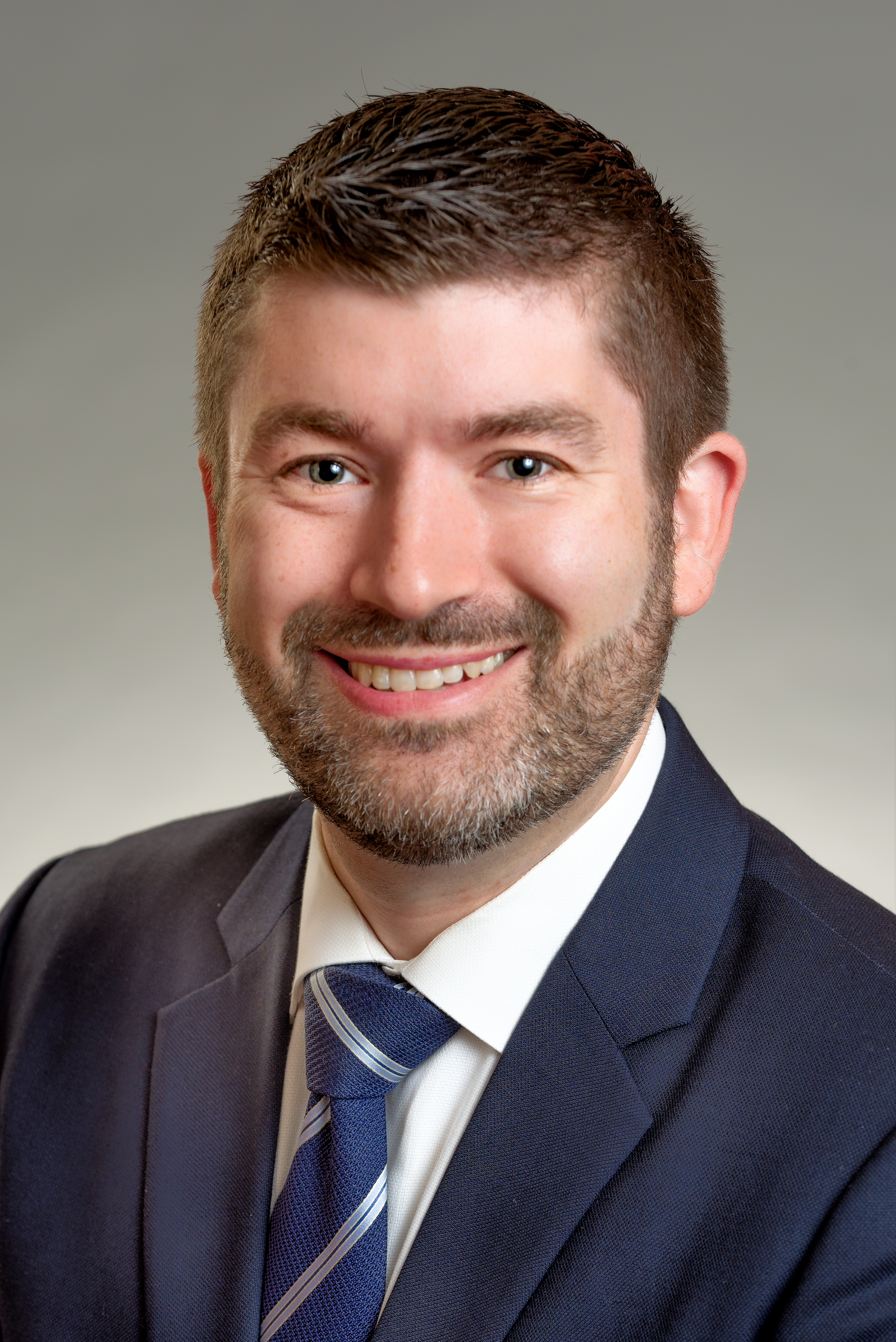

Multnomah County Commissioner
- In office June 9, 2014 – December 2016
- Preceded by: Liesl Wendt
- Succeeded by: Sharon Meieran
- Constituency: District 1

Member of the Oregon House of Representatives from the 42nd District
- In office January 2009 – May 2014
- Preceded by: Diane Rosenbaum
- Succeeded by: Rob Nosse

Personal details
- Born: Portland, Oregon, U.S.
- Party: Democratic
- Education: Lewis & Clark College (BA); Princeton University (MPA–URP)

Jules Bailey (born November, 1979) is an American politician who served in the Oregon House of Representatives from 2009 to 2014, representing inner Southeast and Northeast Portland. Bailey also served on the County Commission for Multnomah County, Oregon from June 2014 to December 2016. In 2016, Bailey ran for mayor of Portland in 2016, losing to Ted Wheeler.

== Early life and education ==
Bailey was raised in Portland, Oregon and graduated from Lincoln High School. He earned a bachelor's degree in Lewis & Clark College and received MPA/URP from Princeton University

Bailey studied in a dual-degree graduate program at Princeton University's Woodrow Wilson School of Public and International Affairs. In 2007, he earned two master's degrees: a Master of Public Affairs (with concentrations in Economic Policy and Environmental Policy) and a Master of Urban and Regional Planning.

== Political career ==
=== Elections ===
In 2008, Bailey was elected to the Oregon House of Representatives to represent District 42. The seat was vacated by Diane Rosenbaum, who was running for election to the Oregon Senate. Bailey earned a plurality victory in the primary election over three other candidates for the Democratic nomination. In the general election, he defeated Pacific Green Party candidate Chris Extine to win election to the seat. Bailey was reelected to the Oregon House of Representatives in 2010 with 84.7% of the vote and in 2012, when he was unopposed in both the primary and general elections.

=== Policy issues ===
In the 2013–2014 legislative session, Bailey served as Chairman of the House Energy and Environment Committee. He also chaired the Joint Committee on Tax Credits.

In 2013, Bailey angered some environmentalists by voting in favor of the Columbia River Crossing mega highway project, which was projected to increase greenhouse gas emissions 32% in the area by 2030 if built; he was presented with the mock environmental "Cars Rejuvenating Carbon" award during an Oregon League of Conservation Voters event shortly after the vote in the Oregon House.

Bailey worked to encourage bicycle transportation. He sponsored bills to increase state funding for biking and walking facilities and to allow an Idaho stop for cyclists. He also sponsored a bill to make traffic fines proportional to vehicle weight in order to recognize that heavier vehicles, when driven dangerously, are more hazardous to the people around them than small vehicles.

=== Multnomah County Commissioner ===
From June 2014 to the end of 2016, Bailey represented District 1, which includes the areas of Multnomah County west of the Willamette River and inner Southeast Portland, on the Multnomah County Commission. Bailey was elected to the Multnomah County Commission in a special election in May 2014. He succeeded Liesl Wendt, who had been appointed to fill the seat on an interim basis when Deborah Kafoury resigned to run for County Chair. Bailey defeated community activist Brian Wilson, winning 73.1% of the vote. During his tenure on the Commission, Bailey focused on homelessness, easing the process of financing seismic and energy conservation upgrades to commercial buildings, and funding seismic resiliency upgrades for bridge infrastructure.

=== Portland Mayoral Campaign ===
In November 2015, Bailey announced his campaign for Portland mayor to take on Oregon State Treasurer Ted Wheeler. Bailey ran a progressive and populist campaign compared to Wheeler's moderate campaign. Bailey voluntarily limited campaign contributions to $250, while Wheeler did not and was criticized for taking money from out of town sources. Bailey ended up losing, coming in second place with 31,955 votes (16.6%) compared to Wheeler's 105,562 votes (54.7%).

== Professional life ==
In September 2020, Bailey filed an elections complaint against Portland mayoral candidate Sarah Iannarone alleging that she misled voters about her educational credentials.

In January 2017, he joined the Oregon Beverage Recycling Cooperative as chief stewardship officer, and served as CEO in 2023. Bailey announced he was leaving OBRC in October 2023. In May 2024, he joined CLYNK (a container redemption service operator in Maine) as the chief strategy officer. He is the board chair of the Oregon League of Conservation Voters.

== See also ==
- Oregon legislative elections, 2008
- 75th Oregon Legislative Assembly (2009–2010)
- 76th Oregon Legislative Assembly (2011–2012)
- 77th Oregon Legislative Assembly (2013–2014)
