= Mark Hass =

American politician

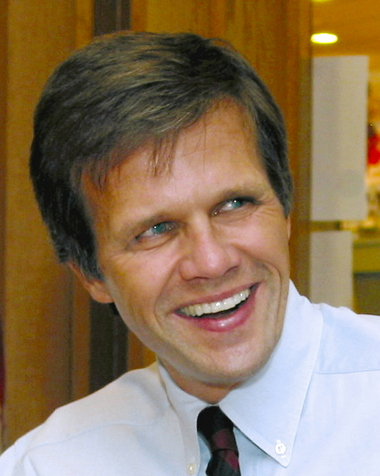

Member of the Oregon Senate from the 14th district
- In office January 2007 – January 14, 2021
- Preceded by: Ryan Deckert
- Succeeded by: Kate Lieber

Member of the Oregon House of Representatives from the 27th district
- In office January 2001 – January 2007
- Preceded by: Ryan Deckert
- Succeeded by: Tobias Read

Personal details
- Born: December 10, 1956 (age 69) Newport, Rhode Island, U.S.
- Party: Democratic
- Spouse: Tamra
- Children: 2
- Education: University of Oregon (BS); American University (MA)

Mark Hass (born December 10, 1956) is an American politician from the US state of Oregon. A Democrat, he was the representative for District 14 in the Oregon State Senate from November 21, 2007, until January 10, 2021. He sought the office of Oregon Secretary of State in 2020.

== Early years ==
Hass was born in Newport, Rhode Island, on December 10, 1956, and moved to Oregon with his parents as a young boy. Growing up, he was a Boy Scout and an Eagle Scout.

In 1980, Hass graduated from the University of Oregon with a Bachelor of Science in journalism. In 1981, he earned his Master of Arts in communication from the American University School of Communication.

Prior to serving in the legislature, Hass spent 20 years as a journalist, most recently at KATU television from 1984 to 2000. He won an Emmy Award in 1998 for writing.

== Oregon legislature ==
Hass was selected in fall 2007 by the County Commissions of Washington and Multnomah counties to serve the remainder of Senator Ryan Deckert's term, following Deckert's resignation. He was elected for a full term in 2008. Hass has subsequently been reelected twice, in 2012 and 2016.

Hass is the Chairman of the Senate Committee on Finance and Revenue. He is also a member of the Senate Education Committee Senate Labor and Business Committee, and the Joint Interim Committee on Public Education Appropriation. He also serves as Senate Democratic Whip.

Throughout his time in the Oregon Legislature, Hass has made reforming education in Oregon his chief priority. In 2011, Hass sponsored a bill (SB248) for full-day kindergarten, which replaced half-day kindergarten in Oregon public schools in the 2015-16 school year. Hass was also instrumental in restructuring the state's higher education system. In 2011, as a member of the Higher Education Workgroup, Hass led the legislative efforts to pass SB 242, which provided greater autonomy for Oregon's seven public universities. It also created the Higher Education Coordinating Commission. During that same 2011 session, Hass led the passage of SB 253, which put the 40-40-20 goals into state law. Those goals seek a workforce by 2025 that is made up of 40 percent people who hold a bachelor's degree or higher, 40 percent who hold a two-year degree and the remaining 20 percent people who hold the equivalent of a high school diploma.

During the 2013 Legislative session, Hass sponsored Senate Bill 270 after chairing the Oregon Legislative Task Force on University Governance. Senate Bill 270 created institutional governing boards for the schools in the Oregon University System. That same year, Hass was the chief sponsor of a bill that established the Accelerated Learning Committee, an institution promoting access to dual credit programs in Oregon high schools.

In 2015, Hass was a chief sponsor of Senate Bill 81, which created the Oregon Promise. The Oregon Promise is a last-dollar program allowing students graduating from an Oregon high school, who meet specified criteria, to attend community college tuition-free.

Perhaps Hass' most significant reforms happened in the recently completed 2019 Legislative session. Long a critic of Oregon's inadequate K-12 education system, Hass spearheaded the passage of the Student Success Act. The bill makes new investments in Oregon's education system by prioritizing early childhood development, mental healthcare in schools, and increasing graduation rates.

== Personal life ==
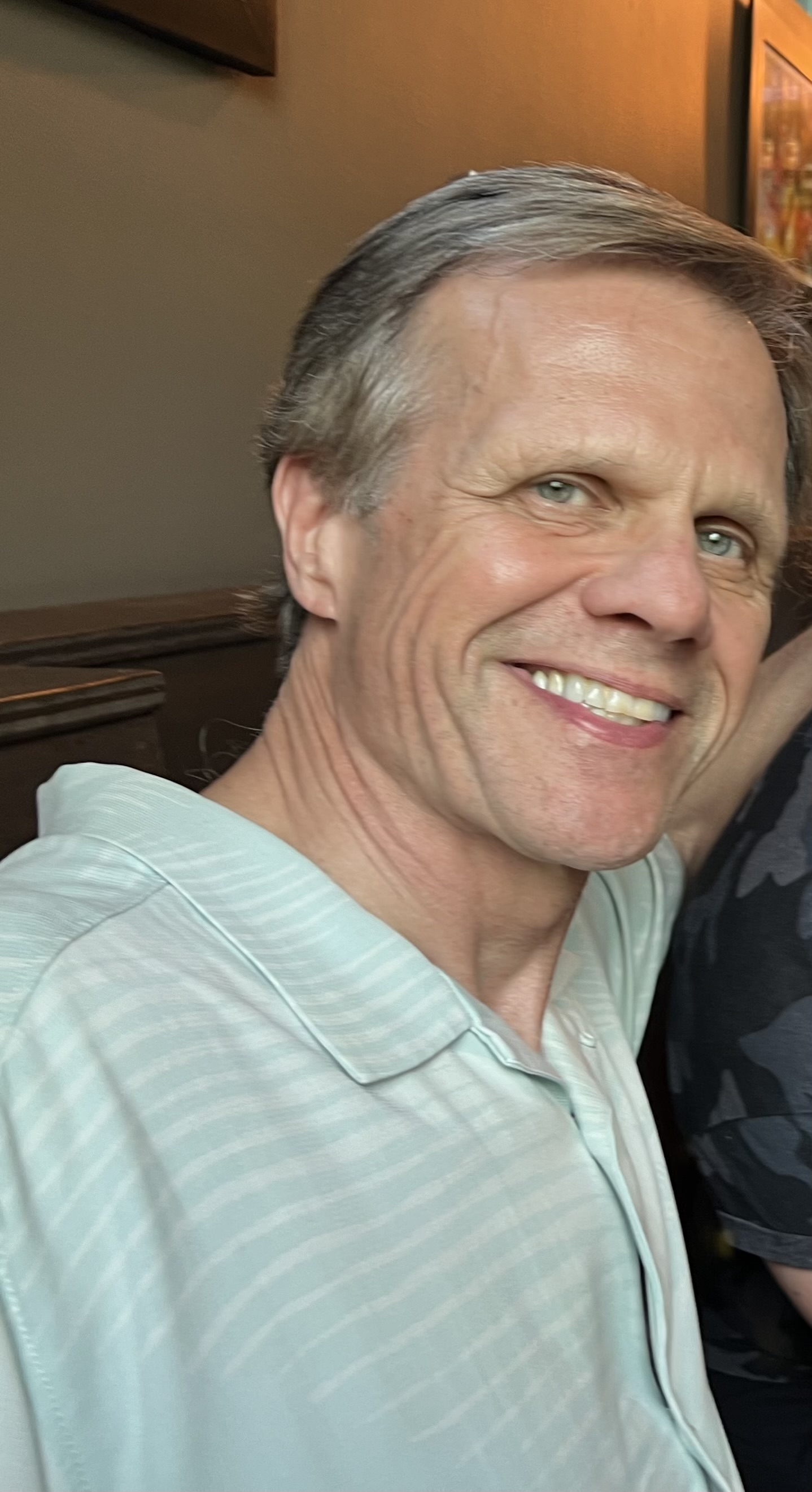
Hass in 2024

Outside of the legislature, Hass works as an account manager for Cappelli Miles, an advertising and brand identity firm with offices in Portland and Eugene. Hass is also a member of the Board of Directors for the Northwest Health Foundation.

Hass' wife, Tamra, is a speech pathologist.

== See also ==
- 74th Oregon Legislative Assembly
- 75th Oregon Legislative Assembly
- 76th Oregon Legislative Assembly
- 77th Oregon Legislative Assembly
