= Wayne Krieger =

American politician

Member of the Oregon House of Representatives from the 1st district
- In office January 13, 2003 – January 9, 2017
- Preceded by: Betsy Johnson
- Succeeded by: David Brock Smith

Member of the Oregon House of Representatives from the 48th district
- In office January 3, 2001 – January 3, 2003
- Preceded by: Ken Messerle
- Succeeded by: Michael Schaufler

Personal details
- Born: September 1940 (age 85–86) Portland, Oregon
- Party: Republican

Wayne Krieger (born September 1940) is an American Republican politician, retired game warden, and tree farmer from Gold Beach on the southern coast of the U.S. state of Oregon. He served on the Oregon State Police Force from 1964 to 1991. He represented District 1 (formerly District 48) of the Oregon House of Representatives from 2001 until 2017.

== Early life, education, and law enforcement career ==
He was born in 1940 in Portland and was raised in Seaside, Oregon. He graduated from Oregon Institute of Technology (OIT) in 1961.

He was an Oregon State Police officer for over 27 years. He served in the Game Enforcement Division, enforcing fish and wildlife laws. He retired in July 1991.

He was a Forestry adviser for former State Representative Walt Schroeder.

He has won numerous awards including Coos-Curry Tree Farmer of the Year (1981), Oregon Tree Farmer of the Year (1992), National Tree Farmer of the Year (1993), and Curry County Conservation Farmer of the Year (1993).

== Oregon House of Representatives ==
=== Elections ===
In 2000, he ran for the 48th district of the Oregon House of Representatives. He defeated Democrat Barbara Dodrill 56%–44%. After redistricting, he decided to run in Oregon's 1st house district. In 2002, he won re-election to a second term by defeating Democrat Dave Tilton 66%–33%. He won re-election in 2004 (64%), 2006 (73%), 2008 (61%), 2010 (72%), and 2012 (68%).

=== Tenure ===
Krieger is pro-life. When he was Chairman of the Judiciary Committee, he was disappointed when they failed to pass a bill that make violence against pregnant women a two-person victim offense.

In 2005, he opposed legalizing civil unions or gay marriage for LGBT couples.

In 2011, he supported medical marijuana. In 2013, he voted in favor of marijuana legalization in Judiciary Committee.

=== Committee assignments ===
- Agriculture and Natural Resources
- Judiciary (Vice-Chair)
- Public Safety
- State and Federal Affairs (Chair)

== Electoral history ==
2004 Oregon State Representative, 1st district
Party	Candidate	Votes	%
Republican	Wayne Krieger	19,746	63.9
Democratic	Charles Hochberg	11,088	35.9
Write-in		65	0.2
Total votes		30,899	100%

2006 Oregon State Representative, 1st district
Party	Candidate	Votes	%
Republican	Wayne Krieger	16,736	73.5
Libertarian	Robert Taylor	5,861	25.7
Write-in		182	0.8
Total votes		22,779	100%

2008 Oregon State Representative, 1st district
Party	Candidate	Votes	%
Republican	Wayne Krieger	17,590	60.6
Democratic	Richard (Rick) Goche	11,357	39.1
Write-in		68	0.2
Total votes		29,015	100%

2010 Oregon State Representative, 1st district
Party	Candidate	Votes	%
Republican	Wayne Krieger	18,115	72.2
Democratic	Eldon Rollins	6,875	27.4
Write-in		97	0.4
Total votes		25,087	100%

2012 Oregon State Representative, 1st district
Party	Candidate	Votes	%
Republican	Wayne Krieger	21,505	68.3
Democratic	Jim Klahr	9,917	31.5
Write-in		75	0.2
Total votes		31,497	100%

2014 Oregon State Representative, 1st district
Party	Candidate	Votes	%
Republican	Wayne Krieger	18,891	69.9
Democratic	Jim Klahr	8,004	29.6
Write-in		117	0.4
Total votes		27,012	100%

== See also ==
- 75th Oregon Legislative Assembly (2009–2010)
- 74th Oregon Legislative Assembly (2007–2008)
