= Chris Harker =

American politician

Member of the Oregon House of Representatives from the 34th district
- In office 2009–2015
- Preceded by: Suzanne Bonamici
- Succeeded by: Ken Helm

Personal details
- Born: March 1954 (age 72)
- Party: Democratic
- Education: The University of Michigan

Chris Harker is an American politician. A Democrat, he served for six years as a state representative for Oregon's House District 34.

== Family ==
Harker and his spouse, a teacher, have two children.

== Occupation ==
Chris Harker founded Cayuse, Inc. in 1994 and is its CEO. In 2012, he sold the company to Evisions, Inc. for an undisclosed amount.

== Political career ==
On November 4, 2008, Chris Harker defeated Republican opponent Piotr Kuklinski and was elected to the Oregon House of Representatives with more than twice his opponent's votes. Harker represented communities from Washington County, encompassing parts of Beaverton and unincorporated Washington County.

In the 76th Legislative Assembly, Harker served as Co-Chair of the Joint Legislative Audits and Information Management and Technology Committee, as a member of the House Subcommittee on Higher Education, and as a member of the House Human Services Committee. During the 75th Legislative Assembly, he served as the vice chair of the House Health Care Committee, and as a member of both the House Education Committee and the Joint Ways and Means General Government Subcommittee.

== Committee assignments ==
=== 2011-2012 ===
In the 2011-2012 legislative session, Harker has been appointed to these committees:

- Joint Legislative Committee on Audits and Information Management and Technology, Co-Chair
- House Higher Education Subcommittee
- House Human Services Committee

=== 2009-2010 ===
- Joint Ways and Means General Government Subcommittee
- House Education Committee
- House Health Care Committee

== Education ==
- Post-Doctoral Fellow, The Mayo Clinic, Rochester, MN (1985–1987).
- Ph.D., Human Physiology, The University of Michigan, Ann Arbor (1985).
- B.S., Plant Ecology, The University of Michigan, Ann Arbor (1977).
