= Greg Matthews (politician) =

American politician

- Matthews in 2026

Member of the Oregon House of Representatives from the 50th district
- In office January 2009 – January 2015
- Preceded by: John Lim
- Succeeded by: Carla Piluso

Personal details
- Born: Gresham, Oregon
- Party: Democratic
- Profession: fire chief
- Website: electgregmatthews.com

Military service
- Branch/service: United States Army; Military Police Corps
- Rank: Sergeant
- Greg Matthews' voice Matthews speaking about the 77th Oregon Legislative Assembly; Recorded July 31, 2013

Gregory J. Matthews (born in Gresham, Oregon) is an American politician and a former Democratic member of the Oregon House of Representatives, where he represented District 50 from 2009 to 2015.

== Education ==
Matthews graduated from Gresham High School.

== Elections ==
- 2008 To challenge incumbent Republican Representative and former state Senator John Lim for the House District 50 seat, Matthews was unopposed for the May 20, 2008 Democratic Primary, winning with 5,157 votes (61.4%), and won the November 4, 2008 General election with 13,868 votes (54.5%) against Representative Lim, who later ran for Governor of Oregon.
- 2010 Matthews was unopposed for the May 18, 2010, Democratic primary, winning with 3,568 votes, and won the November 2, 2010 General election with 10,550 votes (53.9%) against Republican nominee Andre Wang.
- 2012 Matthews was unopposed for the May 15, 2012, Democratic primary, winning with 2,955 votes, and won the November 6, 2012 General election with 13,856 votes (66.0%) against Republican nominee Logan Boettcher.

Matthews declined to seek reelection in 2014 after being appointed as chief of the Gresham Fire Department.

== Electoral history ==
2008 Oregon State Representative, 50th district
Party	Candidate	Votes	%
Democratic	Greg Matthews	13,868	54.5
Republican	John Lim	11,487	45.2
Write-in		70	0.3
Total votes		25,425	100%

2010 Oregon State Representative, 50th district
Party	Candidate	Votes	%
Democratic	Greg Matthews	10,550	53.9
Republican	Andre Wang	8,983	45.9
Write-in		48	0.2
Total votes		19,581	100%

2012 Oregon State Representative, 50th district
Party	Candidate	Votes	%
Democratic	Greg Matthews	13,856	66.0
Republican	Logan Boettcher	7,037	33.5
Write-in		101	0.5
Total votes		20,994	100%
