= Laurie Monnes Anderson =

American politician

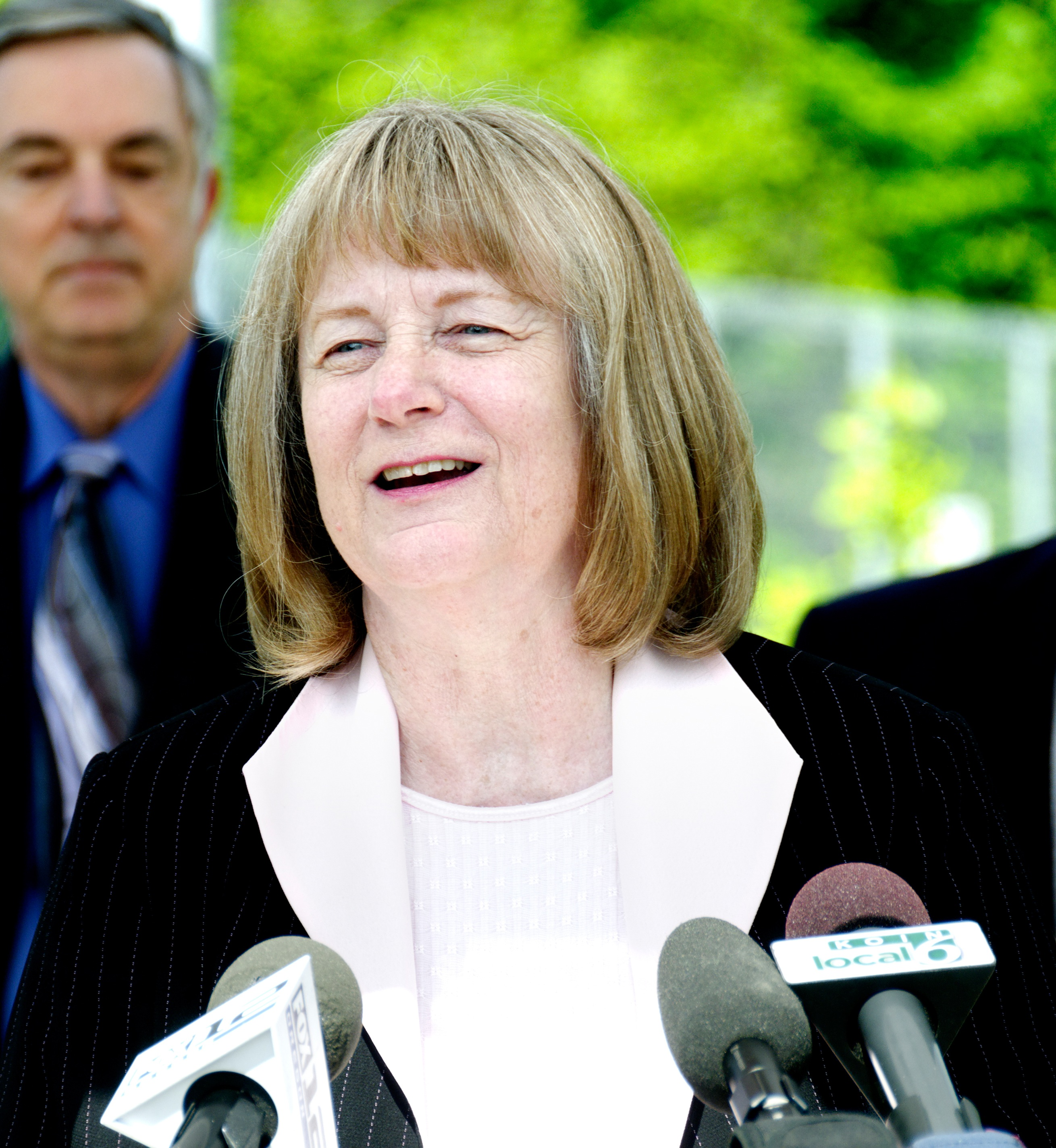

President pro tempore of the Oregon State Senate
- In office January 9, 2017 – January 11, 2021
- Preceded by: Ginny Burdick
- Succeeded by: James Manning Jr.

Member of the Oregon State Senate from the 25th district
- In office January 10, 2005 – January 11, 2021
- Preceded by: John Minnis
- Succeeded by: Chris Gorsek

Member of the Oregon House of Representatives from the 50th district
- In office January 8, 2001 – January 10, 2005
- Preceded by: Ron Sunseri
- Succeeded by: John Lim

Personal details
- Born: December 31, 1945 (age 80) Coronado, California, U.S.
- Party: Democratic
- Education: Willamette University (BS); University of Colorado, Boulder (MS); Radford University (BS)
- Laurie Monnes Anderson's voice Monnes Anderson speaking about the 77th Oregon Legislative Assembly; Recorded July 31, 2013

Laurie Monnes Anderson (born December 31, 1945) is an American Democratic politician who most recently served in the Oregon Senate, representing District 25 in eastern Multnomah County, Oregon, including parts of the cities of Fairview, Gresham, Troutdale, and Wood Village. She previously served two terms in the Oregon House of Representatives.

== Early life and career ==
Born Laurie Monnes in Coronado, California, she grew up in Gresham, Oregon, one of four children of Bud and Ellene Groening Monnes, who were both teachers. She graduated from Gresham High School and received a bachelor's degree in biology from Willamette University in 1968, and a master's in biology from the University of Colorado in 1972. In 1981, she earned a degree in nursing from Radford University. She married and raised two children, divorcing in 1985.

== Political career ==
Following a career as a public health nurse, Monnes Anderson began serving on the Gresham-Barlow School District board in 1991. In 1998, she ran for the Oregon House of Representatives representing District 22, but lost to incumbent Ron Sunseri by 250 votes. In 2000, Sunseri did not seek re-election, and Monnes Anderson defeated Republican nominee Ed Golobay for the seat in a close election. She was re-elected to the seat (renumbered to District 50) by a wide margin in 2002 over Ernest Hodgin.

In 2004, she sought election to the Oregon Senate in District 25. In this race, she again faced Ron Sunseri, who had defeated her in her first House race in 1998. However, this time, Monnes Anderson prevailed by 9 percentage points in an expensive race.

She was unopposed for her party's nomination in 2008. She defeated Republican Dave Kim in the general election.

== Personal ==
Monnes Anderson lives in Gresham, Oregon. She is a first cousin of cartoonist Matt Groening, the creator of The Simpsons. Monnes Anderson's mother, Ellene Groening Monnes, is the sister of Groening's father Homer. Laurie Monnes Anderson has two children and is now a grandmother.

== Electoral history ==
2004 Oregon State Senator, 25th district
Party	Candidate	Votes	%
Democratic	Laurie Monnes Anderson	26,157	52.8
Republican	Ron Sunseri	23,182	46.8
Write-in		158	0.3
Total votes		49,497	100%

2008 Oregon State Senator, 25th district
Party	Candidate	Votes	%
Democratic	Laurie Monnes Anderson	27,013	58.4
Republican	Dave Kim	19,036	41.2
Write-in		167	0.4
Total votes		46,216	100%

2012 Oregon State Senator, 25th district
Party	Candidate	Votes	%
Democratic	Laurie Monnes Anderson	22,944	53.3
Republican	Scott Hansen	18,962	44.1
Libertarian	Eugene A Newell Jr	1,046	2.4
Write-in		81	0.2
Total votes		43,033	100%

2016 Oregon State Senator, 25th district
Party	Candidate	Votes	%
Democratic	Laurie Monnes Anderson	25,339	55.1
Republican	Tamie Tlustos-Arnold	18,742	40.7
Libertarian	Jeffrey Ricks	1,854	4.0
Write-in		75	0.2
Total votes		46,010	100%

Oregon Senate
Preceded by Ginny Burdick	President pro tempore of the Oregon Senate; 2017–2021	Succeeded by James Manning Jr.
