= Ginny Burdick =

American politician (born 1947)

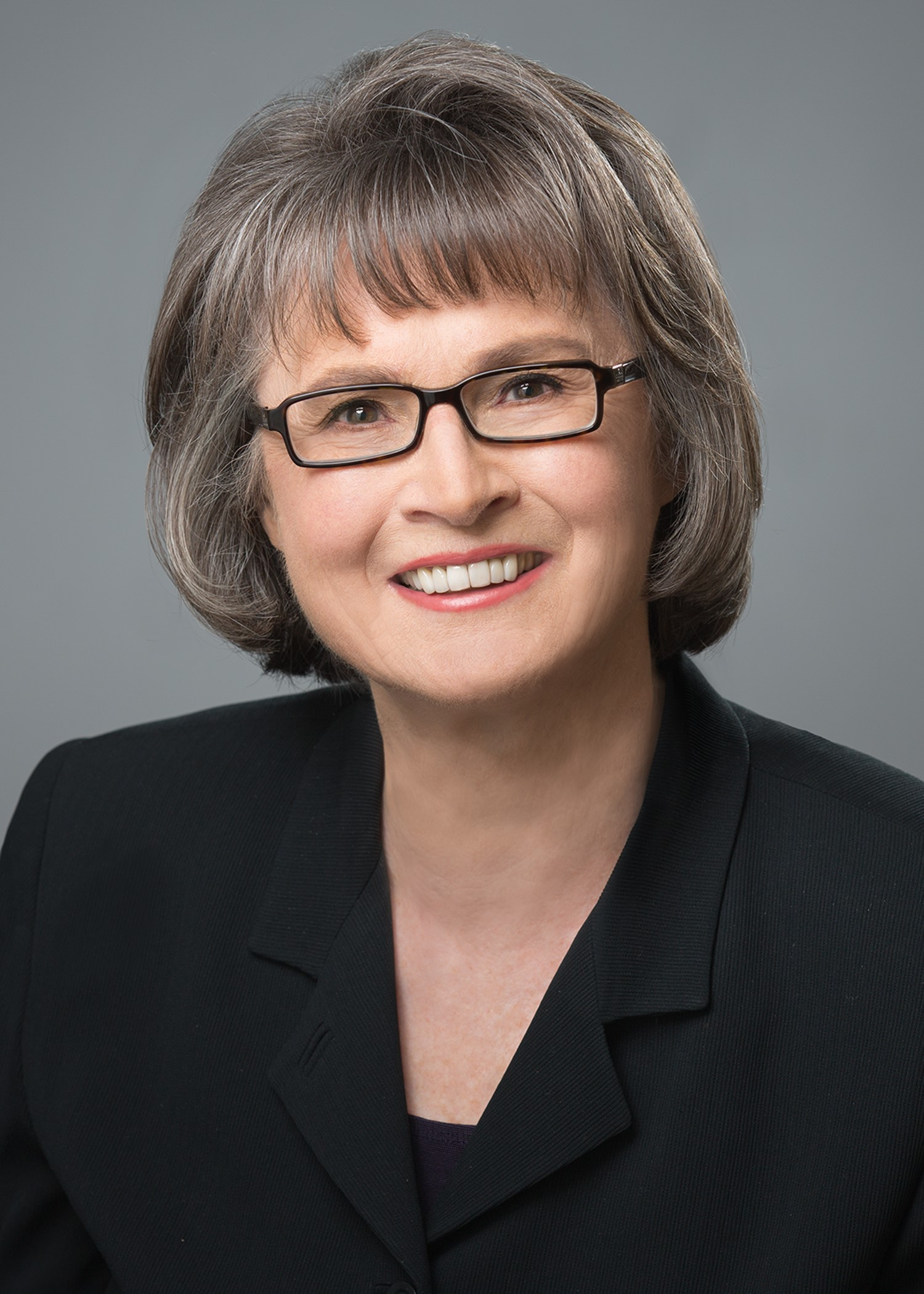

Majority Leader of the Oregon Senate
- In office September 28, 2015 – May 22, 2020
- Preceded by: Diane Rosenbaum
- Succeeded by: Rob Wagner

Member of the Oregon Senate from the 18th district
- In office January 1997 – 2021
- Preceded by: Dick Springer
- Succeeded by: Akasha Lawrence-Spence

Personal details
- Born: December 3, 1947 (age 78) Portland, Oregon, U.S.
- Party: Democratic
- Education: University of Puget Sound (BS); University of Oregon (MA)

Virginia Burdick (born December 3, 1947) is an American politician from the U.S. state of Oregon, who served seven terms in the Oregon State Senate. She represented Tigard and Southwest Portland in Senate District 18.

== Early life and education ==
Burdick is a native of Portland, where she graduated from Woodrow Wilson High School. She earned her bachelor's degree in psychology from the University of Puget Sound in 1969 and her masters in journalism from the University of Oregon in 1973.

== Career ==
She was a member of the Land Conservation and Development Commission from 1987 to 1993. She ran against incumbent Portland City Commissioner Erik Sten in 2006. In the May 2006 primary election, she narrowly missed qualifying for a runoff election.

Burdick is also a communications consultant, specializing in crisis communications.

=== Oregon Legislature ===
Burdick served as the Majority Leader of the Oregon Senate from 2015 to 2020. She also served five years as Senate President Pro Tempore. First elected to the Senate in 1996, Burdick has served as chair of the Judiciary Committee, the Rules Committee, the Finance and Revenue Committee, and co-chair of the Marijuana Legalization Committee. She currently chairs the Senate Finance and Revenue Committee.

Burdick is one of the Legislature's leading advocates for gun control legislation. In the 2017 Legislative Session, she joined with Republican Sen. Brian Boquist, R-Dallas, to sponsor Oregon’s Extreme Risk Protection Order (ERPO) law. Oregon's ERPO is a tool to help prevent suicide and other harmful behavior by removing dangerous weapons from people in crisis. Similar to Washington's Extreme Risk Protection Order – a ballot measure that passed statewide with about 70 percent of the vote in November 2016 – Oregon's ERPO allows a process for keeping deadly weapons away from a person found by the court finds to be at risk of suicide or being a danger to others.

In the 2018 Legislative Session, Burdick supported the passage of House Bill 4145, which strengthened Oregon's gun control laws by aligning the definition of a domestic violence conviction under Oregon's Unlawful Possession of Firearms statute with the definitions of domestic violence found elsewhere in Oregon law, effectively closing the loophole for when there is a dating relationship. It also adds a stalking misdemeanor as a qualifying offense, subject to firearm dispossession.

== Personal life ==
Burdick has two daughters.

== Electoral history ==
2004 Oregon State Senator, 18th district
Party	Candidate	Votes	%
Democratic	Ginny Burdick	37,540	62.3
Republican	John Wight	20,502	34.0
Libertarian	Roger F. Garcia	2,120	3.5
Write-in		112	0.2
Total votes		60,274	100%

2008 Oregon State Senator, 18th district
Party	Candidate	Votes	%
Democratic	Ginny Burdick	41,916	70.0
Republican	John Wight	17,809	29.7
Write-in		189	0.3
Total votes		59,914	100%

2012 Oregon State Senator, 18th district
Party	Candidate	Votes	%
Democratic	Ginny Burdick	43,412	69.3
Republican	Suzanne Gallagher	19,037	30.4
Write-in		193	0.3
Total votes		62,642	100%

2016 Oregon State Senator, 18th district
Party	Candidate	Votes	%
Democratic	Ginny Burdick	51,491	97.4
Write-in		1,349	2.6
Total votes		52,840	100%

2020 Oregon State Senator, 18th district
Party	Candidate	Votes	%
Democratic	Ginny Burdick	63,082	95.8
Write-in		2,776	4.2
Total votes		65,858	100%

Oregon Senate
Preceded by Diane Rosenbaum	Majority Leader of the Oregon Senate; 2015–2020	Succeeded by Rob Wagner
