= Tim Freeman =

American politician and business owner (born 1965)

Member of the Oregon House of Representatives from the 2nd district
- In office 2009–2015
- Preceded by: Susan Morgan
- Succeeded by: Dallas Heard

Personal details
- Born: January 1965 (age 61) Santa Monica, California
- Party: Republican
- Spouse: Angelia
- Profession: Small business owner

Tim J. Freeman (born January 1965) is a small business owner and Republican politician from the U.S. state of Oregon. In 2008, he was elected to the Oregon House of Representatives representing District 2, which encompasses portions of Douglas, Jackson, and Josephine counties, including the cities of Canyonville, Glendale, Myrtle Creek, Riddle, and Roseburg.

== Early life and career ==
Freeman was born in Santa Monica, California and was raised in Oakland, Oregon. He graduated from Oakland High School in 1983 and attended the Oregon Institute of Technology, where he studied computer systems engineering technology. He worked as a field mechanic for a logging company and in 1991, he became the owner of the Garden Valley Shell service station in Roseburg. In 2007, Freeman graduated from the Douglas County Citizen Law Enforcement Academy.

== Political career ==
Freeman has served on the Roseburg City Council since 2003, and served as council president for three years. From 2006 to 2007, he was the chair of the General Government Committee for the League of Oregon Cities. In 2008, he ran for the seat in the Oregon House of Representatives vacated by Susan Morgan, who did not seek re-election. Freeman defeated Roseburg businessman Jim Fox in the Republican primary, and then defeated Democrat Harry McDermott in the general election.

== Personal ==
Freeman and his wife Angelia live in Roseburg and have two children.
