= Doug Whitsett =

American politician

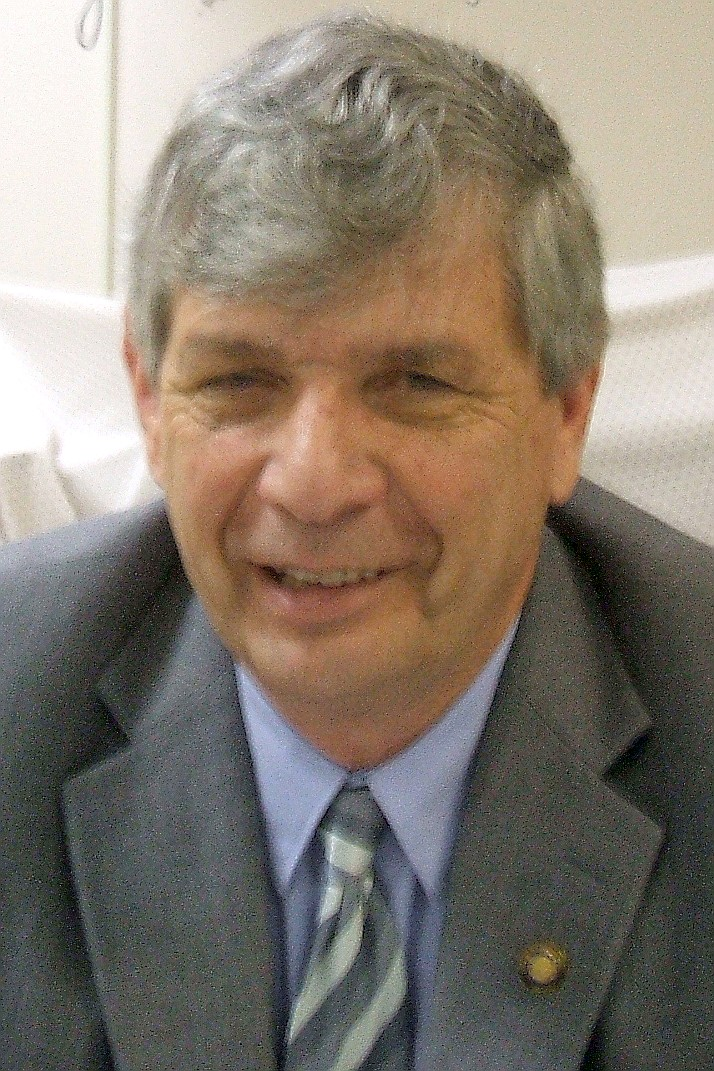

Member of the Oregon Senate from the 28th district
- In office 2005 – January 9, 2017
- Succeeded by: Dennis Linthicum

Personal details
- Born: March 24, 1943 (age 83) Monterey, California
- Party: Republican
- Spouse: Gail Whitsett

Doug Whitsett (born March 24, 1943) is an American politician who served in the Oregon State Senate from 2005 until 2017, representing District 28. He is a Republican and served on the Ways and Means Committee, the Ways and Means Public Safety subcommittee, the Emergency Board, the Judiciary Committee, and the Office of Administrative Hearings Oversight Committee.

Whitsett represents the people of Klamath, Lake, and Crook counties, and of parts of both Jackson and Deschutes counties. He was elected in 2004 and won reelection in 2008. His wife Gail Whitsett was his chief of staff before being elected to Oregon House of Representatives.

== Early life ==
On March 24, 1943, Whitsett was born in Monterey, California. Whitsett grew up on a small dairy farm in Powell Butte, Oregon. Whitsett graduated from Crook County High School.

== Education ==
Whitsett received his Associate of Arts degree from Central Oregon Community College and his Doctor of Veterinary Medicine degree from Washington State University.

== Career ==
Whitsett was a veterinarian. In 1968, he began practicing at Klamath Animal Clinic in Klamath Falls, Oregon. By 1986, Whitsett was the president of that clinic, which he sold in 1994.

Whitsett has been active in Klamath Basin and state water issues. Before being elected to the senate he sat on the Water for Life board of directors along with his wife. He is a past president of the Oregon Veterinary Medical Association, the Klamath County Cattlemen's Association, and the Lake County Veterinary Medical Association. He has been active with the Oregon Cattlemen's Association, has served as a director of the Klamath Bull Sale for the past 35 years, and has lectured at state and regional veterinary conferences. He has written articles for various publications including Cascade Cattlemen, Cattlemen's Beef Producer, Capital Press, Klamath Falls Herald and News, and Oregonians In Action's Looking Forward newsletter.

Whitsett and his wife currently own and operate two small farms in the Klamath Basin where they breed and raise European warmblood horses for dressage and jumping.

== Electoral history ==
2004 Oregon State Senator, 28th district
Party	Candidate	Votes	%
Republican	Doug Whitsett	38,292	70.0
Democratic	Ross Carroll	16,272	29.8
Write-in		117	0.2
Total votes		54,681	100%

2008 Oregon State Senator, 28th district
Party	Candidate	Votes	%
Republican	Doug Whitsett	39,416	97.6
Write-in		949	2.4
Total votes		40,365	100%
