= John Huffman (politician) =

American politician (born 1957)

Member of the Oregon House of Representatives from the 59th district
- In office August 27, 2007 – October 28, 2017
- Preceded by: John Dallum
- Succeeded by: Daniel Bonham

Personal details
- Born: 1957 (age 68–69) Missouri
- Party: Republican
- Website: votehuffman.com

Military service
- Branch/service: United States Army
- Years of service: 1979–1984

John E. Huffman (born in 1957 in Missouri) is an American politician, who was a Republican member of the Oregon House of Representatives representing District 59 from his appointment on August 27, 2007 to fill the vacancy caused by the resignation of John Dallum, until his own resignation on October 28, 2017 to take a job in the Trump administration.

== Elections ==
- 2012 Huffman was unopposed for the May 15, 2012 Republican Primary, winning with 5,352 votes, and won the November 6, 2012 General election with 17,466 votes (66.7%) against Democratic nominee Gary Ollerenshaw.
- 2008 Huffman was unopposed for the May 20, 2008 Republican Primary, winning with 5,385 votes, and won the November 4, 2008 General election with 15,107 votes (59.1%) against Democratic nominee Mike Ahern
- 2010 Huffman won the May 18, 2010 Republican Primary with 5,961 votes (92.5%), and won the November 2, 2010 General election with 15,033 votes (69.5%) against Democratic nominee Will Boettner.

== Electoral history ==
2008 Oregon State Representative, 59th district
| Party | Candidate | Votes | % |
|---|---|---|---|
| Republican | John E Huffman | 15,107 | 59.1 |
| Democratic | Mike Ahern | 10,417 | 40.7 |
| Write-in | | 43 | 0.2 |
| Total votes | | 25,567 | 100% |

2010 Oregon State Representative, 59th district
| Party | Candidate | Votes | % |
|---|---|---|---|
| Republican | John E Huffman | 15,033 | 69.5 |
| Democratic | Will Boettner | 6,565 | 30.3 |
| Write-in | | 38 | 0.2 |
| Total votes | | 21,636 | 100% |

2012 Oregon State Representative, 59th district
| Party | Candidate | Votes | % |
|---|---|---|---|
| Republican | John E Huffman | 17,466 | 66.7 |
| Democratic | Gary L Ollerenshaw | 8,678 | 33.1 |
| Write-in | | 53 | 0.2 |
| Total votes | | 26,197 | 100% |

2014 Oregon State Representative, 59th district
| Party | Candidate | Votes | % |
|---|---|---|---|
| Republican | John E Huffman | 18,325 | 98.1 |
| Write-in | | 347 | 1.9 |
| Total votes | | 18,672 | 100% |

2016 Oregon State Representative, 59th district
| Party | Candidate | Votes | % |
|---|---|---|---|
| Republican | John E Huffman | 21,392 | 70.2 |
| Democratic | Tyler J Gabriel | 8,982 | 29.5 |
| Write-in | | 81 | 0.3 |
| Total votes | | 30,455 | 100% |
