= Jeff Barker (politician) =

American politician

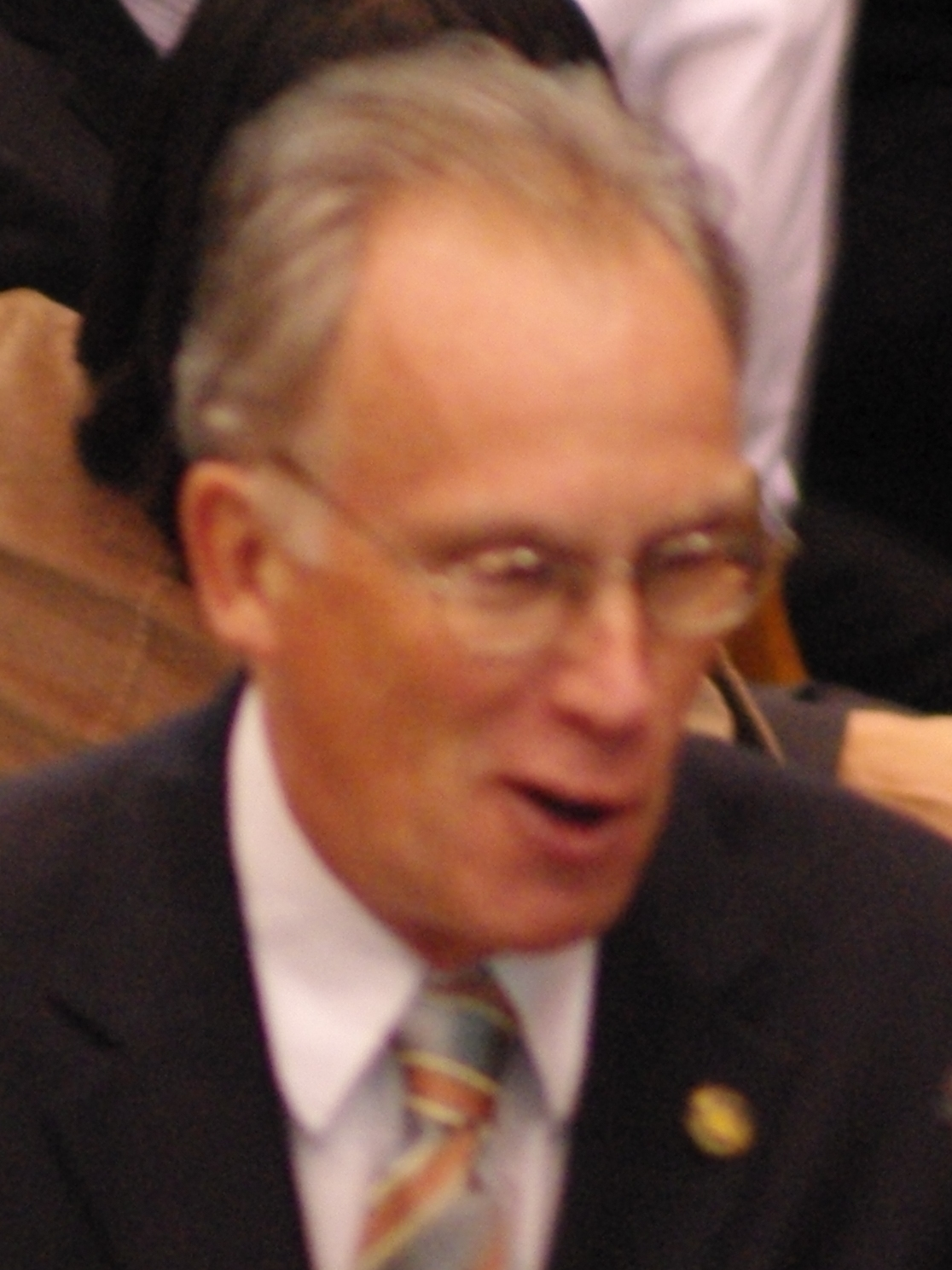
- Barker in 2009

Member of the Oregon House of Representatives from the 28th district
- In office 2003 – January 11, 2021
- Preceded by: Tootie Smith
- Succeeded by: Wlnsvey Campos

Personal details
- Born: 1943 (age 82–83) Portland, Oregon
- Party: Democratic
- Education: Portland State University (BS)

Jeff Barker (born 1943) is an American politician and law enforcement officer who served as a member of the Oregon House of Representatives, for the 28th district from 2003 until his retirement in 2021.

== Early life and education ==
Barker was born in 1943 in Portland, Oregon and his home city is in Aloha, Oregon. Barker received a Bachelor of Science degree from Portland State University.

== Career ==
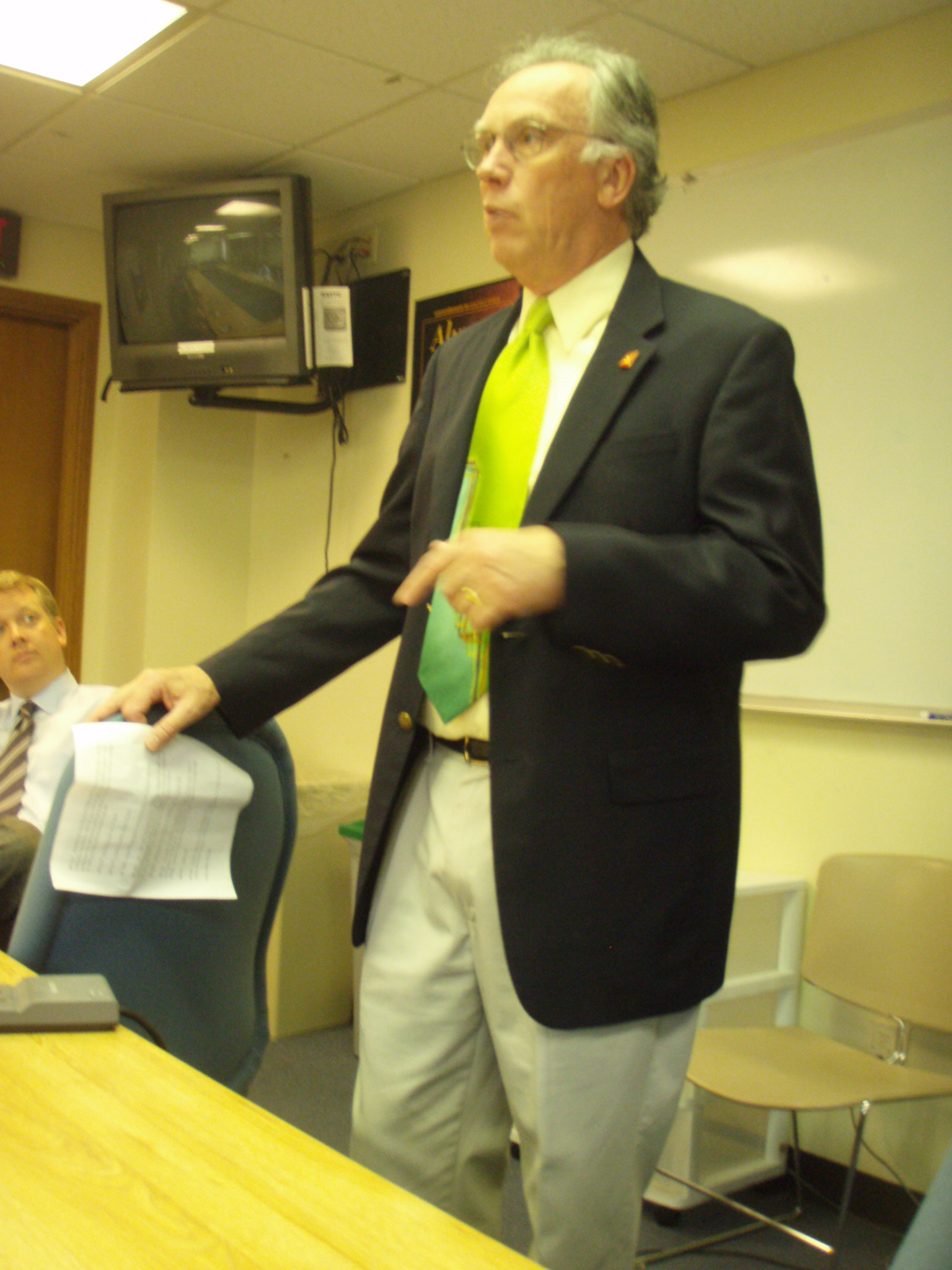
Barker in 2009

Prior to running for the Oregon State Legislature, Barker served as an enlisted man in the United States Marines, and later an Oregon State Trooper. He entered the Portland Police Bureau as an officer, before making detective, and eventually reaching the rank of Lieutenant.

He led the Portland Police Association in 1995–1996, describing its power as "Chiefs come and go like itinerant laborers, but the union is always there."

His support and advocacy in animal-related measures saw him labeled as a 2011 "Top Dog" by the Oregon Humane Society.

== Legislative committees ==
Barker has been a member of the following legislative committees:

- Judiciary, Chair
- Public Safety Subcommittee, Vice Chair
- Member, Ways and Means Committee
- Veteran's Committee, Chair
- Member, PERS Reform Committee (2003)
- Member, Health Committee

== Professional experience ==
Barker has had the following professional experience:

- Police lieutenant, Portland Police Bureau, retired
- Trooper, Oregon State Police
- United States Marine Corps 1961–1964, enlisted

== Electoral history ==
2004 Oregon State Representative, 28th district
Party	Candidate	Votes	%
Democratic	Jeff Barker	15,652	79.8
Progressive	Steve Geiger	3,343	17.0
Write-in		625	3.2
Total votes		19,620	100%

2006 Oregon State Representative, 28th district
Party	Candidate	Votes	%
Democratic	Jeff Barker	10,924	64.6
Republican	Eldon Derville-Teer	5,912	34.9
Write-in		86	0.5
Total votes		16,922	100%

2008 Oregon State Representative, 28th district
Party	Candidate	Votes	%
Democratic	Jeff Barker	15,019	96.2
Write-in		600	3.8
Total votes		15,619	100%

2010 Oregon State Representative, 28th district
Party	Candidate	Votes	%
Democratic	Jeff Barker	10,314	56.9
Republican	Bill Berg	7,787	42.9
Write-in		41	0.2
Total votes		18,142	100%

2012 Oregon State Representative, 28th district
Party	Candidate	Votes	%
Democratic	Jeff Barker	14,841	60.6
Republican	Manuel Castaneda	9,605	39.2
Write-in		55	0.2
Total votes		24,501	100%

2014 Oregon State Representative, 28th district
Party	Candidate	Votes	%
Democratic	Jeff Barker	14,582	80.7
Libertarian	Lars D H Hedbor	3,302	18.3
Write-in		193	1.1
Total votes		18,077	100%

2016 Oregon State Representative, 28th district
Party	Candidate	Votes	%
Democratic	Jeff Barker	17,107	64.1
Republican	Gary M Carlson	9,481	35.5
Write-in		112	0.4
Total votes		26,700	100%

2018 Oregon State Representative, 28th district
Party	Candidate	Votes	%
Democratic	Jeff Barker	20,789	84.2
Libertarian	Lars D H Hedbor	3,680	14.9
Write-in		213	0.9
Total votes		24,682	100%
