= Jim Weidner =

American politician (born 1968)

Member of the Oregon House of Representatives from the 24th district
- In office January 12, 2009 – January 16, 2017
- Preceded by: Donna G. Nelson
- Succeeded by: Ron Noble

Personal details
- Born: December 28, 1968 McMinnville, Oregon
- Party: Republican
- Spouse: Susan Jean Weidner
- Relations: Roy Ramirez, Ray Weidner, Jacob Weidner, Job Weidner
- Occupation: Businessman

Jim Weidner (born December 28, 1968) is an American former politician and small business owner from the state of Oregon. A member of the Republican Party, he served in the Oregon House of Representatives from 2009 to 2017, representing District 24 in Yamhill County.

== Early life and education ==
Weidner was born in Yamhill County, Oregon, where his family has resided since the late 1800s. He attended Yamhill Grade School, Sheridan High School, and West Valley Academy.

== Career ==
Prior to his time in elected office, Weidner worked for several lumber companies and mills in Oregon. His professional background includes a focus on vibration analysis, a field aimed at improving industrial efficiency by reducing waste and maximizing production. This experience, according to Weidner, contributed to his problem-solving skills and interest in applying practical solutions to public policy.

Weidner is also a small business owner and previously operated a restaurant called Lago de Chapala. His experience as a restaurateur shaped his perspective on the challenges facing small businesses in Oregon. He has emphasized policies aimed at supporting local economies and entrepreneurs.

In addition to his professional work, Weidner has been active in his community as a youth coach and organizer for a local Sports Ministry chapter.

== Political career ==
Weidner was elected to the Oregon House of Representatives in 2008 and took office in January 2009. He represented House District 24, which includes parts of Yamhill County. During his tenure, Weidner focused on economic policy, support for small businesses, and social conservatism. He did not seek reelection in 2016.

== Personal life ==
Weidner and his wife live in Yamhill County and have four sons. They are active members of Newberg Christian Church, where they facilitate marriage classes and participate in community-building efforts. Weidner has publicly expressed strong support for Biblical values and traditional family structures, often citing Scripture in relation to his political views.

He has also voiced concerns about state policies regarding children's welfare and criminal justice, particularly related to addiction and child protection laws.

== Views ==
Weidner advocates for advancing what he describes as "God-honoring" leadership and preserving religious liberty in public life. He supports policies that prioritize the well-being of children and the elderly and opposes what he views as the excessive protection of individual rights for convicted criminals at the expense of public safety.
