= Kevin Cameron (politician) =

American politician from Oregon

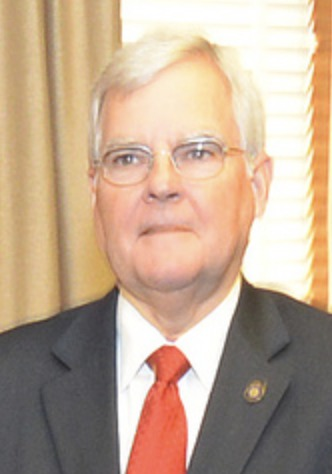

Marion County Commissioner
- Incumbent
- Assumed office June 2014
- Preceded by: Patti Milne

Member of the Oregon House of Representatives from the 19th district
- In office February 17, 2005 – June 1, 2014
- Succeeded by: Denyc Boles

Personal details
- Born: c. 1958 (age 67–68) California
- Party: Republican
- Spouse: Judy
- Education: Oregon State University

Kevin Cameron (born c. 1958) is an American Republican politician from Salem in the U.S. state of Oregon. He represented district 19 in the Oregon House of Representatives from February 2005 to May 2014. On May 20, 2014, he was appointed as Marion County Commissioner to position 1 vacated by Patti Milne. Milne resigned in April 2014 to seek Oregon Senate seat district 11.

Cameron was born in the late 1950s and grew up in southern California. He and his wife Bicky (B.Iwakuni, Japan) reside in Detroit Lake, Oregon.

Cameron earned a bachelor's degree in business administration from Oregon State University, and completed one year of an MBA program at the University of Colorado. He is the founder and CEO of Cafe Today Restaurants and catering. Cafe Today has five locations in the greater Portland area. In 2000, Cameron received the Restaurateur of the Year Award from the Oregon Restaurant Association.

Commissioner Cameron is an active member in the Salem community. From 1991 to 2012 he served as a board member at Morningstar Community Church. He resigned after Morningstar Community Church was investigated for claims of sexual misconduct. He worked with the Battle Creek Little League as Softball Manager and led the All Star Team in their 1999 tournament. Cameron continues involvement with a number of community groups by giving of his time, business experience and finances. In June 2012 he completed six years of service on the OSU Alumni Board. He received an Honorary Doctorate from Corban University in May 2011, and currently serves on their Leadership and Political Engagement Advisory Board.

== Political career ==
Cameron was sworn into the Oregon House of Representatives by Chief Justice Wallace on February 17, 2005. Since then, he has served on numerous committees and eventually became the Deputy Republican Leader in 2009. During the 2011 legislative session, where the House was tied 30 Republicans and 30 Democrats for the first time in Oregon's history, Cameron served as the House Republican Leader through June 2012. He served on the House Transportation and Economic Development Committee; the Judiciary Committee and co-chaired the Rural Communities Committee during the 77th Oregon Legislative Assembly. In 2017 at the SAIF Agri-Business Banquet Cameron made a joke condoning Domestic Violence. He later apologized.

== Resignation ==
As Republican House Leader, Cameron encouraged fellow Republican Matt Wingard not to run again after charges that he allegedly forced a female staffer into a sexual relationship. Wingard denied the charges, resigned as Deputy House Leader and did not seek re-election. Cameron later admitted he, Wingard and five other Oregon Republicans had visited a topless bar while on a golfing trip to Palm Springs, California, in January that year. The married Cameron stepped down after hearing rumors that Wingard, whom he had forced to resign a month prior, was threatening to go public with the story. Cameron resigned his seat in the House on June 1, 2014.

Cameron was then appointed to Position 1 on the Marion County Board of Commissioners. There he spent 9 years and 5 months serving the citizens of South Salem, Aumsville and Turner as their representative in HD19.
