= Diane Rosenbaum =

American politician (born 1949)

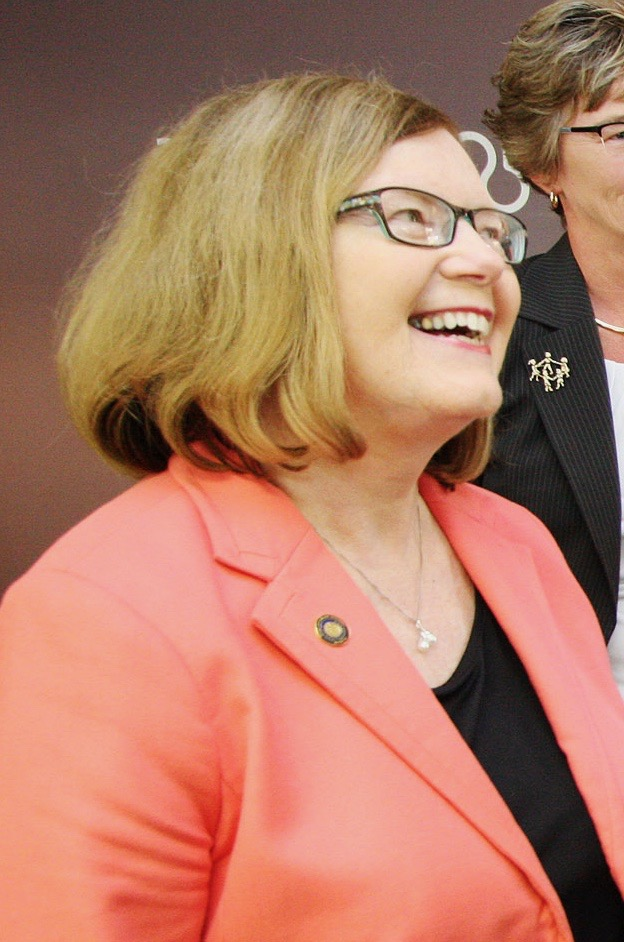
- Rosenbaum in 2015

Multnomah County Commissioner from the 3rd district
- In office January 1, 2023 – June 12, 2023
- Preceded by: Jessica Vega Pederson
- Succeeded by: Julia Brim-Edwards

Member of the Oregon Senate from the 21st district
- In office 2009–2017
- Preceded by: Kate Brown
- Succeeded by: Kathleen Taylor

Member of the Oregon House of Representatives from the 42nd district
- In office 1998–2009
- Succeeded by: Jules Kopel-Bailey

Personal details
- Born: November 26, 1949 (age 76) Berkeley, California
- Party: Democratic
- Spouse: Jas Adams
- Occupation: Technician, politician

Diane Maura Rosenbaum (born November 26, 1949) is an American politician in the US state of Oregon who was the majority leader of the Oregon State Senate. She was a Democratic member of the Oregon House of Representatives, representing District 42 (Southeast Portland) from 1998 to 2009. She served as speaker pro tempore. In the 2008 elections, she ran unopposed for the Oregon State Senate, replacing Kate Brown, who was elected secretary of state. She won reelection to District 21 in 2012 after defeating Republican Cliff Hutchison. She is Jewish.

After Governor John Kitzhaber resigned in February 2015, elevating Brown to the governorship, Rosenbaum was named by The Oregonian as a potential secretary of state. In 2023, Rosenbaum temporarily replaced County Chair Jessica Vega Pederson on the Multnomah County Board of Commissioners. Julia Brim-Edwards was elected to fill the position in the May special election.
