= Oregon's 6th House district =

Legislative districts in the state of Oregon

Oregon's 6th House district after redistricting after the 2020 Census

District 6 of the Oregon House of Representatives is one of 60 House legislative districts in the state of Oregon. As of 2021, the boundary for the district includes a portion of Jackson County and almost entirely consists of the city of Medford. The current representative for the district is Republican Kim Wallan of Medford.

== Election results ==
District boundaries have changed over time. Therefore, representatives before 2021 may not represent the same constituency as today. General election results from 2000 to present are as follows:

Year	Candidate	Party	Percent	Opponent	Party	Percent	Opponent	Party	Percent	Write-in percentage
2000	Charlie Ringo	Democratic	51.15%	John Scruggs	Republican	44.45%	Kevin Schaumleffle	Libertarian	4.41%	
2002 (Note: Rob Patridge was the incumbent in this election. He previously represented District 50, but was moved to this district due to redistricting following the 2000 United States census.)	Rob Patridge	Republican	62.66%	Barbara Davidson	Democratic	36.98%	No third candidate			0.35%
2004	Sal Esquivel	Republican	58.36%	John Doty	Democratic	41.64%	No third candidate			
2006	Sal Esquivel	Republican	51.92%	Mike Moran	Democratic	47.88%	No third candidate			0.20%
2008	Sal Esquivel	Republican	53.55%	Lynn Howe	Democratic	46.28%	No third candidate			0.17%
2010	Sal Esquivel	Republican	56.55%	Lynn Howe	Democratic	43.16%	No third candidate			0.29%
2012	Sal Esquivel	Republican	96.09%	Unopposed						3.91%
2014	Sal Esquivel	Republican	95.87%	Unopposed						4.13%
2016	Sal Esquivel	Republican	56.49%	Mike Moran	Democratic	43.25%	No third candidate			0.27%
2018	Kim Wallan	Republican	53.89%	Michelle Blum Atkinson	Democratic	45.99%	No third candidate			0.12%
2020	Kim Wallan	Republican	54.57%	Alberto Enriquez	Democratic	43.10%	Alex Levi Usselman	Libertarian	2.28%	0.06%
2022	Kim Wallan	Republican	60.21%	Dan Davis	Democratic	39.69%	No third candidate			0.10%
2024	Kim Wallan	Republican	58.0%	Lilia Caballero	Democratic	41.9%	No third candidate			0.1%

== See also ==
- Oregon Legislative Assembly
- Oregon House of Representatives
