= Oregon's 59th House district =

Legislative districts in the state of Oregon

Oregon's 59th House district after redistricting after the 2020 Census

District 59 of the Oregon House of Representatives is one of 60 House legislative districts in the state of Oregon. As of 2021, the boundary for the district contains all of Crook and portions of Deschutes and Jefferson counties. The district is anchored by the population centers of Madras and Prineville as well as parts of Bend and Redmond. The current representative for the district is Republican Vikki Breese-Iverson of Prineville.

== Election results ==
District boundaries have changed over time. Therefore, representatives before 2021 may not represent the same constituency as today. General election results from 2000 to present are as follows:

| Year | Candidate | Party | Percent | Opponent | Party | Percent | Write-in percentage |
|---|---|---|---|---|---|---|---|
| 2000 | Greg Smith | Republican | 69.25% | Linda Harrington | Democratic | 30.75% | |
| 2002 | John Mabrey | Republican | 54.85% | Jim Gilbertson | Democratic | 44.72% | 0.43% |
| 2004 | John Dallum | Republican | 58.33% | Jack Lorts | Democratic | 41.67% | |
| 2006 | John Dallum | Republican | 50.58% | Jim Gilbertson | Democratic | 49.26% | 0.15% |
| 2008 (Note: John Huffman was the incumbent in this election. He was appointed to this seat on August 27, 2007 to replace John Dallum, who resigned from office.) | John Huffman | Republican | 59.09% | Mike Ahern | Democratic | 40.74% | 0.17% |
| 2010 | John Huffman | Republican | 69.54% | Will Boettner | Democratic | 30.27% | 0.18% |
| 2012 | John Huffman | Republican | 66.67% | Gary Ollerenshaw | Democratic | 33.13% | 0.20% |
| 2014 | John Huffman | Republican | 98.14% | Unopposed | | | 1.86% |
| 2016 | John Huffman | Republican | 70.24% | Tyler Gabriel | Democratic | 29.49% | 0.27% |
| 2018 (Note: Daniel Bonham was the incumbent in this election. He was appointed to this seat on November 20, 2017 to replace John Huffman, who resigned to take an appointment to the United States Department of Agriculture.) | Daniel Bonham | Republican | 62.22% | Darcy Long-Curtiss | Democratic | 37.70% | 0.09% |
| 2020 | Daniel Bonham | Republican | 59.84% | Arlene Burns | Democratic | 40.03% | 0.13% |
| 2022 (Note: Vikki Breese-Iverson was the incumbent in this election. She previously represented District 55, but was moved to this district due to redistricting following the 2020 United States Census.) | Vikki Breese-Iverson | Republican | 72.42% | Lawrence Jones | Democratic | 27.46% | 0.12% |
| 2024 | Vikki Breese-Iverson | Republican | 71.6% | Brian K Samp | Democratic | 28.1% | 0.2% |

== See also ==
- Oregon Legislative Assembly
- Oregon House of Representatives
