= Oregon's 55th House district =

Legislative districts in the state of Oregon

Oregon's 55th House district after redistricting after the 2020 Census

District 55 of the Oregon House of Representatives is one of 60 House legislative districts in the state of Oregon. As of 2021, the boundary for the district contains rural parts of Deschutes and Klamath counties and includes Crater Lake and Crater Lake National Park. The current representative for the district is Republican E. Werner Reschke of Klamath Falls.

== Election results ==
District boundaries have changed over time. Therefore, representatives before 2021 may not represent the same constituency as today. General election results from 2000 to present are as follows:

Year	Candidate	Party	Percent	Opponent	Party	Percent	Opponent	Party	Percent	Write-in percentage
2000	Ben Westlund	Republican	73.75%	Douglas Dunlap	Democratic	26.25%	No third candidate			
2002	George Gilman	Republican	64.01%	Karole Stockton	Democratic	35.48%	No third candidate			0.51%
2004	George Gilman	Republican	97.74%	Unopposed						2.26%
2006	George Gilman	Republican	97.55%	Unopposed						2.45%
2008	George Gilman	Republican	98.19%	Unopposed						1.81%
2010	Mike McLane	Republican	98.07%	Unopposed						1.93%
2012	Mike McLane	Republican	67.92%	John Huddle	Democratic	31.88%	No third candidate			0.2
2014	Mike McLane	Republican	72.38%	Richard Phay	Democratic	21.97%	Frank Brannen	Libertarian	5.36%	0.29%
2016	Mike McLane	Republican	75.65%	Brie Malarkey	Democratic	24.12%	No third candidate			0.23%
2018	Mike McLane	Republican	73.19%	Karen Rippberger	Democratic	26.70%	No third candidate			0.11%
2020	Vikki Breese-Iverson	Republican	73.54%	Barbara Fontaine	Democratic	26.32%	No third candidate			0.14%
2022 (Note: E. Werner Reschke was the incumbent in this election. He previously represented District 56, but was moved to this district due to redistricting following the 2020 United States Census.)	E. Werner Reschke	Republican	68.74%	Brian Lepore	Democratic	31.14%	No third candidate			0.12%
2024	E. Werner Reschke	Republican	69.6%	James Williamson	Democratic	30.3%	No third candidate			0.1%

== See also ==
- Oregon Legislative Assembly
- Oregon House of Representatives
