= Oregon's 10th House district =

Legislative districts in the state of Oregon

Oregon's 10th House district after redistricting after the 2020 Census

District 10 of the Oregon House of Representatives is one of 60 House legislative districts in the state of Oregon. As of 2021, the boundary for the district includes the entirety of Lincoln County and portions of Polk and Lane counties and is centered around Newport and Lincoln City on the central Oregon Coast. The current representative for the district is Democrat David Gomberg of Neotsu.

== Election results ==
District boundaries have changed over time. Therefore, representatives before 2021 may not represent the same constituency as today. General election results from 2000 to present are as follows:

Year	Candidate	Party	Percent	Opponent	Party	Percent	Write-in percentage
2000	Jan Lee	Republican	51.06%	Mike Smith	Democratic	48.94%	
2002 (Note: Alan Brown was the incumbent in this election. He previously represented District 4, but was moved to this district due to redistricting following the 2000 United States census.)	Alan Brown	Republican	50.84%	Marcia Thompson	Democratic	48.85%	0.31%
2004	Alan Brown	Republican	50.68%	Jean Cowan	Democratic	49.32%	
2006	Jean Cowan	Democratic	51.57%	Alan Brown	Republican	48.40%	0.03%
2008	Jean Cowan	Democratic	96.56%	Unopposed			3.44%
2010	Jean Cowan	Democratic	58.36%	Becky Lemier	Republican	41.59%	0.05%
2012	David Gomberg	Democratic	59.06%	Jerome Grant	Republican	40.77%	0.17%
2014	David Gomberg	Democratic	96.87%	Unopposed			3.13%
2016	David Gomberg	Democratic	56.24%	Thomas Donohue	Republican	43.47%	0.29%
2018	David Gomberg	Democratic	57.16%	Thomas Donohue	Republican	42.70%	0.14%
2020	David Gomberg	Democratic	52.40%	Max Sherman	Republican	47.46%	0.14%
2022	David Gomberg	Democratic	56.69%	Celeste McEntee	Republican	43.18%	0.13%
2024	David Gomberg	Democratic	97.4%	Unopposed			2.6%

== See also ==
- Oregon Legislative Assembly
- Oregon House of Representatives
