= David Gomberg =

American politician

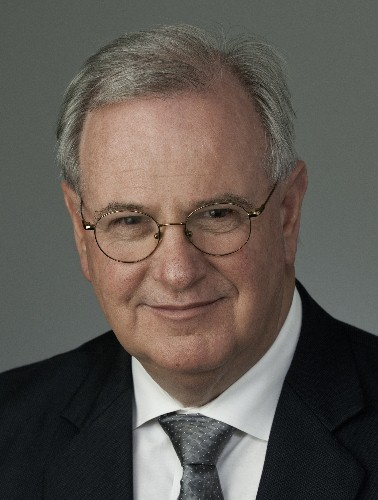

Speaker pro tempore of the Oregon House of Representatives
- Incumbent
- Assumed office January 13, 2025
- Preceded by: Paul Holvey

Member of the Oregon House of Representatives from the 10th district
- Incumbent
- Assumed office January 14, 2013
- Preceded by: Jean Cowan

Personal details
- Born: David William Gomberg; June 9, 1953 (age 73) London, England, UK
- Party: Democratic
- Spouse: Susan Oswald (m. 1986)
- Education: Oregon State University (BA, MA); Willamette University (MBA)
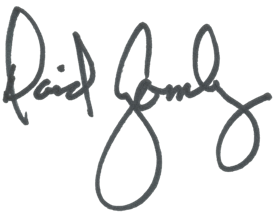
- Signature
- Website: Campaign website State House website

David William Gomberg is a Democratic member of the Oregon House of Representatives, representing District 10 on the state's central coast since January 14, 2013. Prior to his election to the legislature, he was co-owner of a kite design, manufacturing, and sales business.

== Early life ==
David Gomberg was born in 1953, in London, England, the son of a U.S. Air Force officer and his British wife. He graduated from Hiram Johnson High School in Sacramento, California, in 1971.

== Personal life ==
Gomberg moved to Oregon and enrolled at Oregon State University. He earned a bachelor's degree in political science, with Honors, in 1976, served as student body president, and earned an Interdisciplinary master's degree in Political Science, History, and Economics in 1977. In 1981, Gomberg earned an MBA from Willamette University's MBA program.

In 1978, Gomberg worked for U.S. Congressman Les AuCoin in Washington, D.C., and Portland, Oregon. He then attended Willamette University in Salem, Oregon, earning an MBA in 1981.

In 1981 and 1983, Gomberg worked in the Oregon Legislative Assembly as a Chief-of-Staff to freshman legislator Barbara Roberts and then as administrator of the House Education Committee. He then spent three years as an Administrative Hearings Referee for the Department of Motor Vehicles, a position he lost when he declined to cross a public employee picket line.

David Gomberg married Susan Elizabeth Oswald in 1986.

In 1988, the Gombergs moved to the Oregon Coast where David worked as executive director of the Lincoln City Chamber of Commerce. He left that position two years later to focus on his growing kite business.

== Kites ==
Gomberg Kite Productions International (GKPI) was a design and manufacturing, wholesale, and retail business. They operated three web pages and three Northwest Winds retail stores. Their company produced large inflatable kites and custom line decor for retail customers and select wholesale accounts. GKPI also produced a quality series of introductory kites and accessories under the G-Kites brand.

Gomberg has authored four books on kite flying. He served ten terms as president of the American Kitefliers Association (AKA) and four terms as president of the Kite Trade Association International (KTAI). Both organizations recognized Gomberg with their lifetime achievement awards and in 2005, Gomberg was inducted in the World Kiting Hall of Fame.

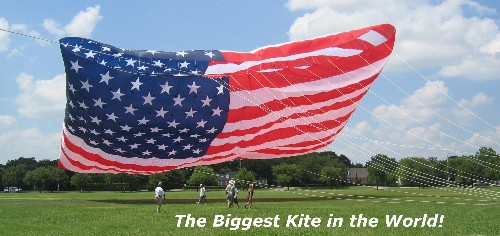

In 2012, GKPI was named Business of the Year in Lincoln City, Oregon. They have also been finalists twice for the Austin Excellence in Family Business awards.

GKPI also specialized in performances with larger show kites. David and Susan have flown in more than 40 countries and done shows for Walt Disney, motion pictures, and the Super Bowl. David has been named an honorary citizen of Weifang, China and Berck, France, and is a patron of the Cape Mental Health Kite Festival in South Africa.

In 2005, GKPI acquired a 10,970 sq ft (1,019 m^{2}) kite, one of the largest kites in the world.

During 2018–2019, David ramped down and closed GKPI in order to focus on his political career and other personal interests. Some of the smaller Gomberg designs were taken over by other kite manufacturers and are still available today.

== Political career ==
In 2012, Gomberg was elected to represent House District 10 in the Oregon Legislature. The district then included portions of Lincoln, Tillamook, Yamhill, and Polk counties. Following redistricting in 2020, the district included all of Lincoln County and western portions of Benton and Lane Counties, stretching over 100 miles of the central coast and inland 50 miles through the Coast Range. His legislative efforts have focused on small business support, government accountability, emergency response, reviving public education system, collecting delinquent state taxes and debt, environmental sustainability and conservation, and advocating for disability and elder rights.

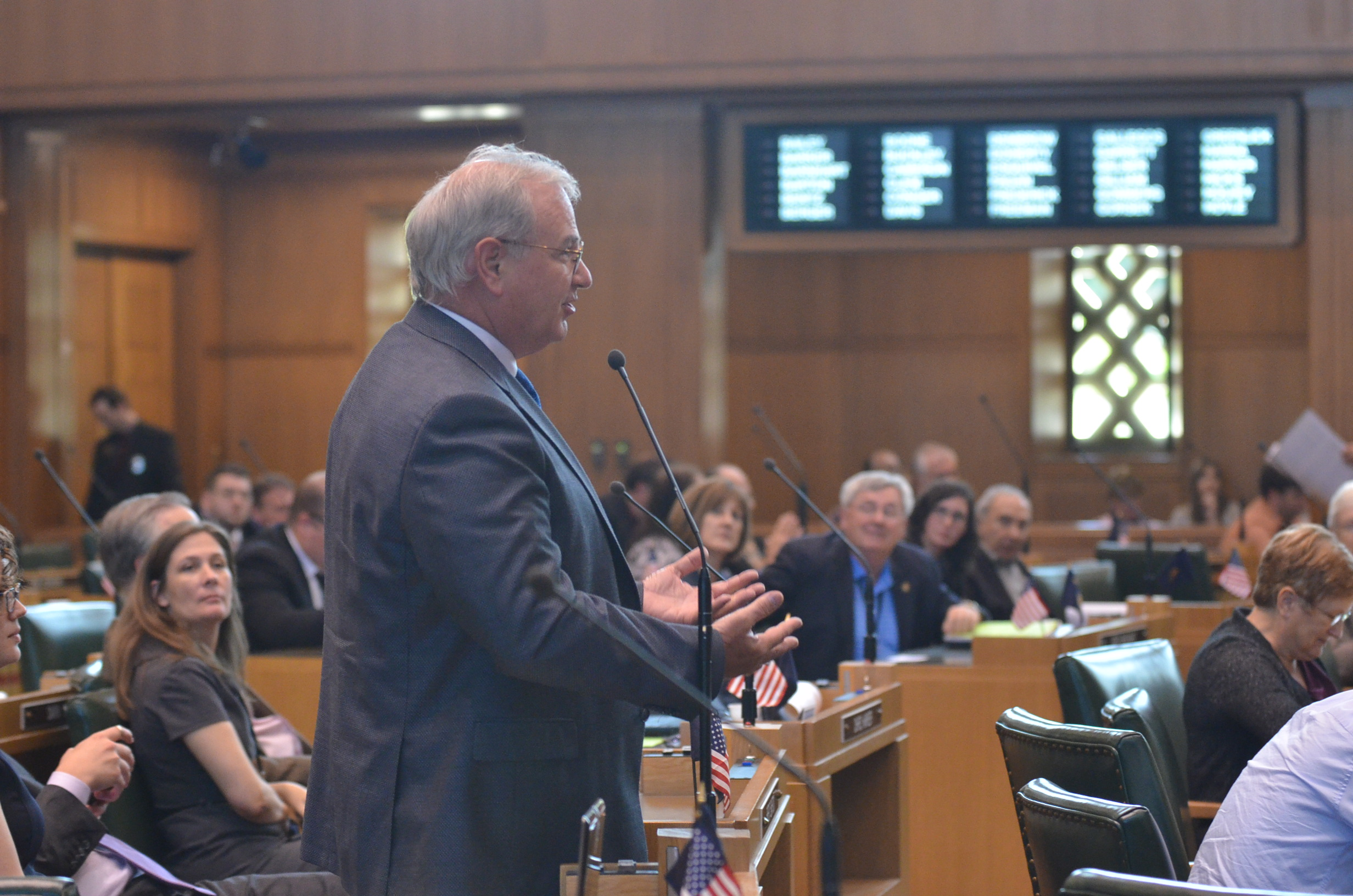
Addressing the Oregon House in 2013

Gomberg currently serves as vice-chair of the Joint Ways & Means Committee, serves as co-chair for the Ways & Means Transportation & Economic Development subcommittee, sits on the Ways & Means General Government subcommittee, serves on the Joint Committee On Legislative Audits and the House Committee on Commerce and Consumer Protection. He is a member of the Emergency Board, the Governor’s Commission on Senior Services, the Oregon Innovation Council, the Seismic Safety Commission, and the Ocean Science Trust.

In 2023, Gomberg was one of a group of several Oregon lawmakers to visit Taiwan on a trip sponsored by the Taiwanese government. In 2024, Gomberg visited Scotland with an Oregon delegation studying wind energy.

Gomberg was elected as speaker pro tempore for the 2025 legislative session.

In September 2025, Gomberg visited Israel on a trip sponsored by the Israeli government, as one of a bipartisan delegation of 250 state legislators to visit. He represented Oregon alongside Republican state representative Emily McIntire. In response to criticism of his visit amidst the Gaza war and concurring genocide, Gomberg said, "Certainly the government of Israel has an agenda, but that doesn’t mean it’s my agenda or the agenda of all the legislators that are here,” he said. “I think it’s time for this conflict to end, and I’m trying to better understand why it’s continuing.”

== Electoral history ==
2012 Oregon State Representative, 10th district
Party	Candidate	Votes	%
Democratic	David Gomberg	15,978	59.1
Republican	Jerome Grant	11,028	40.8
Write-in		46	0.2
Total votes		27,052	100%

2014 Oregon State Representative, 10th district
Party	Candidate	Votes	%
Democratic	David Gomberg	16,881	96.9
Write-in		545	3.1
Total votes		17,426	100%

2016 Oregon State Representative, 10th district
Party	Candidate	Votes	%
Democratic	David Gomberg	17,499	56.2
Republican	Thomas M Donohue	13,524	43.5
Write-in		91	0.3
Total votes		31,114	100%

2018 Oregon State Representative, 10th district
Party	Candidate	Votes	%
Democratic	David Gomberg	17,713	57.2
Republican	Thomas M Donohue	13,232	42.7
Write-in		44	0.1
Total votes		30,989	100%

2020 Oregon State Representative, 10th district
Party	Candidate	Votes	%
Democratic	David Gomberg	20,294	52.4
Republican	Max Sherman	18,383	47.5
Write-in		55	0.1
Total votes		38,732	100%

2022 Oregon State Representative, 10th district
Party	Candidate	Votes	%
Democratic	David Gomberg	21,158	56.7
Republican	Celeste McEntee	16,115	43.2
Write-in		50	0.1
Total votes		37,323	100%

2024 Oregon State Representative, 10th district
Party	Candidate	Votes	%
Democratic	David Gomberg	28,672	97.4
Write-in		775	2.6
Total votes		29,447	100%

Oregon House of Representatives
Preceded by Paul Holvey	Speaker pro tempore of the Oregon House of Representatives; 2025–present	Incumbent
