= Oregon's 8th House district =

Legislative districts in the state of Oregon

Oregon's 8th House district after redistricting after the 2020 Census

District 8 of the Oregon House of Representatives is one of 60 House legislative districts in the state of Oregon. As of 2021, the boundary for the district includes a portion of Lane County, including most of downtown Eugene and the University of Oregon. The current representative for the district is Democrat Lisa Fragala of Eugene.

== Election results ==
District boundaries have changed over time. Therefore, representatives before 2021 may not represent the same constituency as today. General election results from 2000 to present are as follows:

Year	Candidate	Party	Percent	Opponent	Party	Percent	Opponent	Party	Percent	Write-in percentage
2000	Mark Hass	Democratic	64.08%	Lisa Michaels	Republican	35.92%	No third candidate			
2002 (Note: Floyd Prozanski was the incumbent in this election. He previously represented District 40, but was moved to this district due to redistricting following the 2000 United States census.)	Floyd Prozanski	Democratic	73.28%	Greg McNeill	Republican	26.71%	No third candidate			0.01%
2004 (Note: Paul Holvey was the incumbent in this election. He was appointed to this seat on January 16, 2004 to replace Floyd Prozanski, who resigned to take an appointment to the District 4 seat in the Oregon Senate.)	Paul Holvey	Democratic	71.31%	Bill Young	Republican	28.69%	No third candidate			
2006	Paul Holvey	Democratic	77.21%	Andrew Hill	Republican	22.79%	No third candidate			
2008	Paul Holvey	Democratic	97.97%	Unopposed						2.03%
2010	Paul Holvey	Democratic	72.62%	Simone Gordon	Republican	27.19%	No third candidate			0.19%
2012	Paul Holvey	Democratic	70.63%	Aaron Baker	Republican	26.11%	Lucien Blansett	Constitution	3.08%	0.18%
2014	Paul Holvey	Democratic	96.61%	Unopposed						3.39%
2016	Paul Holvey	Democratic	69.31%	Mary Tucker	Republican	26.37%	Marsha Sherwood	Libertarian	4.09%	0.23%
2018	Paul Holvey	Democratic	79.85%	Marsha Sherwood	Libertarian	19.50%	No third candidate			0.65%
2020	Paul Holvey	Democratic	67.69%	Timothy W. Aldal	Republican	29.11%	Marsha Sherwood	Libertarian	3.00%	0.18%
2022	Paul Holvey	Democratic	84.73%	Michael F. Moore	Republican	15.01%	No third candidate			0.26%
2024	Lisa Fragala	Democratic	97.37%	Unopposed						2.63%

== See also ==
- Oregon Legislative Assembly
- Oregon House of Representatives
