= Vikki Breese-Iverson =

American politician

Minority Leader of the Oregon House of Representatives
- In office November 30, 2021 – September 27, 2023
- Preceded by: Christine Drazan
- Succeeded by: Jeff Helfrich

Member of the Oregon House of Representatives from the 59th district
- Incumbent
- Assumed office January 11, 2021
- Preceded by: Daniel Bonham

Member of the Oregon House of Representatives from the 55th district
- In office August 8, 2019 – January 11, 2021
- Preceded by: Mike McLane
- Succeeded by: E. Werner Reschke

Personal details
- Born: Vikki Breese; 1973 or 1974 (age 51–52) Prineville, Oregon, U.S.
- Party: Republican
- Children: 2
- Education: Central Oregon Community College; Oregon State University (BA)

Vikki Breese-Iverson (born 1973/1974) is an American politician and businesswoman who served as the minority leader of the Oregon House of Representatives. A Republican, she represents the 59th district, which includes Prineville in Central Oregon.

== Early life ==
Breese-Iverson grew up in Central Oregon and graduated from Crook County High School in 1992.

== Career ==
Breese-Iverson joined the 80th Oregon Legislative Assembly after being appointed on August 8, 2019 to replace Mike McLane. She owns a real estate business in Prineville. She had previously worked for former Oregon State Senator Ted Ferrioli and former Oregon State House Speaker Karen Minnis.

She won re-election in 2020 by a large margin, 73.5% of the vote.

Breese-Iverson has cast doubt on the validity of the 2020 presidential election results.

On December 11, 2020, Breese-Iverson and 11 other state Republican officials signed a letter requesting Oregon Attorney General Ellen Rosenblum join Texas and other states contesting the results of the 2020 presidential election in Texas v. Pennsylvania. Rosenblum announced she had filed in behalf of the defense, and against Texas, the day prior.

In 2021, Breese-Iverson sent a letter to Secretary of State Shemia Fagan, requesting a "full forensic audit" of Oregon's 2020 elections. In November 2021, she signed a letter along with other Republicans around the nation calling for an audit of the 2020 election in all states.

On November 30, 2021, Breese-Iverson became the House minority leader, after Christine Drazan stepped down from the office to run for governor. She served in this role until September 2023 when she stepped-down due to rumors of her being unseated. She was replaced by Jeff Helfrich.

Following the Standoff at Eagle Pass, Breese-Iverson signed a letter in support of Texas Governor Greg Abbott's decision in the conflict.

In 2023, while Republican Minority Leader, Breese-Iverson was forced to apologize after pictures of her son surfaced on social media performing a Nazi salute while at an air museum. An apology from the son called the picture a “dumb mistake”.

== Personal life ==
She married Bryan Iverson in 2005 in Prineville. They own a ranch and have two sons.

== Electoral history ==
2020 Oregon State Representative, 55th district
Party	Candidate	Votes	%
Republican	Vikki Breese-Iverson	31,572	73.5
Democratic	Barbara Fontaine	11,300	26.3
Write-in		62	0.1
Total votes		42,934	100%

2022 Oregon State Representative, 59th district
Party	Candidate	Votes	%
Republican	Vikki Breese-Iverson	26,528	72.4
Democratic	Lawrence Jones	10,059	27.5
Write-in		45	0.1
Total votes		36,632	100%

2024 Oregon State Representative, 59th district
Party	Candidate	Votes	%
Republican	Vikki Breese-Iverson	29,431	71.6
Democratic	Brian K Samp	11,561	28.1
Write-in		100	0.2
Total votes		41,092	100%

Oregon House of Representatives
Preceded by Christine Drazan	Minority Leader of the Oregon House of Representatives; 2021–2023	Succeeded by Jeff Helfrich
