= Oregon's 56th House district =

Legislative districts in the state of Oregon

Oregon's 56th House district after redistricting after the 2020 Census

District 56 of the Oregon House of Representatives is one of 60 House legislative districts in the state of Oregon. As of 2021, the boundary for the district includes portions of Jackson and Klamath counties, including parts of Eagle Point, Medford, Klamath Falls, and White City. The current representative for the district is Republican Emily McIntire of Eagle Point.

== Election results ==
District boundaries have changed over time. Therefore, representatives before 2021 may not represent the same constituency as today. General election results from 2000 to present are as follows:

Year	Candidate	Party	Percent	Opponent	Party	Percent	Opponent	Party	Percent	Write-in percentage
2000	Patti Smith	Republican	56.94%	Paul Zastrow	Democratic	43.06%	No third candidate			
2002 (Note: Bill Garrard was the incumbent in this election. He previously represented District 53, but was moved to this district due to redistricting following the 2000 United States census.)	Bill Garrard	Republican	97.29%	Unopposed						2.71%
2004	Bill Garrard	Republican	66.03%	James Calvert	Democratic	33.97%	No third candidate			
2006	Bill Garrard	Republican	66.51%	James Calvert	Democratic	33.25%	No third candidate			0.23%
2008	Bill Garrard	Republican	97.27%	Unopposed						2.73%
2010	Bill Garrard	Republican	96.73%	Unopposed						3.27%
2012	Gail Whitsett	Republican	96.79%	Unopposed						3.21%
2014	Gail Whitsett	Republican	97.24%	Unopposed						2.76%
2016	E. Werner Reschke	Republican	48.65%	Al Switzer	Democratic	40.26%	Jonah Hakanson	(Note: Jonah Hakanson ran with no party affiliation in this election.)	10.85%	0.24%
2018	E. Werner Reschke	Republican	71.78%	Taylor Tupper	Democratic	27.95%	No third candidate			0.27%
2020	E. Werner Reschke	Republican	72.59%	Faith Leith	Democratic	27.24%	No third candidate			0.27%
2022	Emily McIntire	Republican	72.60%	Jonathan Chenjeri	Democratic	27.23%	No third candidate			0.17%
2024	Emily McIntire	Republican	96.7%	Unopposed						3.3%

== See also ==
- Oregon Legislative Assembly
- Oregon House of Representatives
