= E. Werner Reschke =

American politician (born 1965)

Eric Werner Reschke
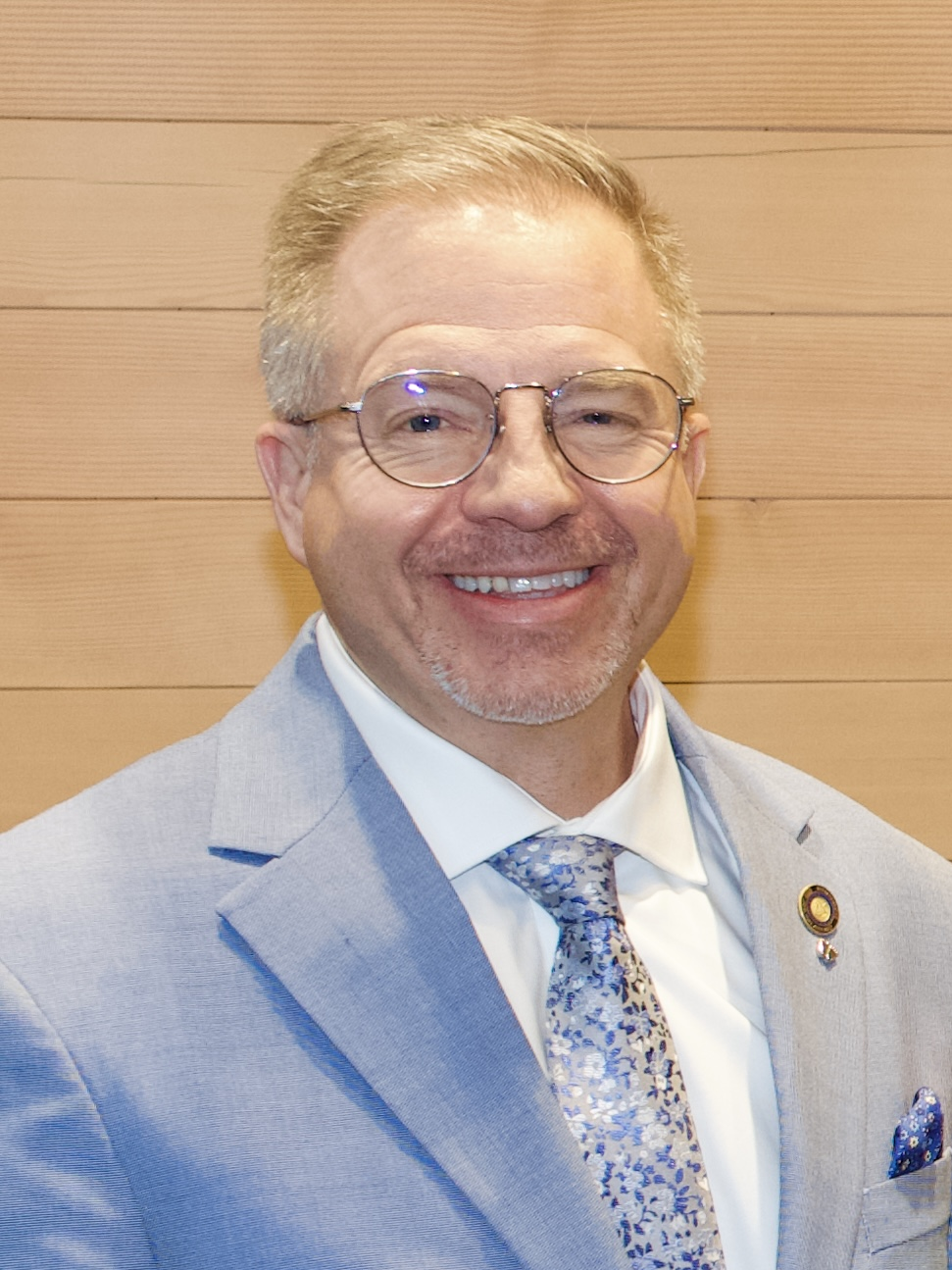
- Reschke in 2025

Member of the Oregon House of Representatives from the 55th district
- Incumbent
- Assumed office January 11, 2021
- Preceded by: Vikki Breese-Iverson

Member of the Oregon House of Representatives from the 56th district
- In office January 9, 2017 – January 11, 2021
- Preceded by: Gail Whitsett
- Succeeded by: Emily McIntire

Personal details
- Born: 1965 (age 60–61) Los Angeles, California, U.S.
- Party: Republican
- Spouse: Ginny Reschke
- Education: Oregon State University

Eric Werner Reschke (born 1965) is an American businessman and Republican politician currently serving in the Oregon House of Representatives. He represents the 55th district, which covers parts of Jackson and Klamath counties, including parts of Klamath Falls.

== Biography ==
Reschke was born in Los Angeles, California (1965), grew up in Beaverton, Oregon and graduated from Sunset High School (1983). He graduated from Oregon State University (1988) with a Bachelor of Arts Degree in Business Administration. After graduation he worked for Georgia-Pacific, Tektronix, and Xerox in the Portland metropolitan area before moving to Klamath County in 2001.

Reschke was a board member of the Klamath County Chamber of Commerce from 2012 until 2016 and was elected to the Oregon State House in 2016. In the election, he earned 48.77% of the vote, defeating Democratic candidate (and former Klamath County Commissioner) Al Switzer and non-affiliated candidate Jonah Hakanson. In 2018 Reschke was reelected earning 71.8% of the vote over Democratic challenger Taylor Tupper. In 2020 Reschke was re-elected earning 71.7% of the vote over Democratic challenger Faith Leith.

On December 11, 2020, Reschke and 11 other state Republican officials signed a letter requesting Oregon Attorney General Ellen Rosenblum join Texas and other states contesting the results of the 2020 presidential election in Texas v. Pennsylvania. Rosenblum announced she had filed in behalf of the defense, and against Texas, the day prior.

On a January 17, 2024 National Association of Christian Lawmakers livestream with host Jason Rapert, Reschke said Christians "are the types of people you want in government making tough decisions at tough times. You don’t want a materialist. You don’t want an atheist. You don’t want a Muslim… You want somebody who understands what truth is, and understands the nature of man, the nature of government and the nature of God." He went on to say "we have a lot of people who are godless, unfortunately, leading the way, and it’s the blind leading the blind". The Freedom From Religion Foundation objected to his comments in a letter from Annie Laurie Gaylor. The People for the American Way's Right Wing Watch objected to his comments, as did Kayse Jama, a fellow member of the Oregon legislature who is Muslim.

== Personal life ==
Reschke is married and has one son. The family attends Calvary Chapel Church in Klamath Falls.

== Electoral history ==
2016 Oregon State Representative, 56th district
Party	Candidate	Votes	%
Republican	Eric Werner Reschke	13,272	48.6
Democratic	Al Switzer	10,983	40.3
Independent	Jonah Hakanson	2,961	10.9
Write-in		66	0.2
Total votes		27,282	100%

2018 Oregon State Representative, 56th district
Party	Candidate	Votes	%
Republican	Eric Werner Reschke	18,312	71.8
Democratic	Taylor Tupper	7,130	27.9
Write-in		68	0.3
Total votes		25,510	100%

2020 Oregon State Representative, 56th district
Party	Candidate	Votes	%
Republican	Eric Werner Reschke	23,604	72.6
Democratic	Faith N Leith	8,859	27.2
Write-in		55	0.2
Total votes		32,518	100%

2022 Oregon State Representative, 55th district
Party	Candidate	Votes	%
Republican	Eric Werner Reschke	24,371	68.7
Democratic	Brian Lepore	11,041	31.1
Write-in		44	0.1
Total votes		35,456	100%

2024 Oregon State Representative, 55th district
Party	Candidate	Votes	%
Republican	E Werner Reschke	27,260	69.6
Democratic	James Williamson	11,848	30.3
Write-in		45	0.1
Total votes		39,153	100%
