= 2022 Oregon House of Representatives election =

- November 8, 2022

All 60 seats in the Oregon House of Representatives 31 seats needed for a majority
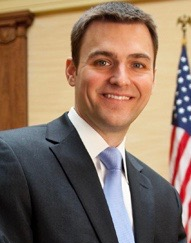

	Majority party	Minority party
Leader	Dan Rayfield	Vikki Breese-Iverson
Party	Democratic	Republican
Leader since	February 1, 2022	November 30, 2021
Leader's seat	16th-Corvallis	55th-Prineville
Last election	37	23
Seats won	35	25
Seat change	▼2	▲2
Popular vote	981,568	878,962
Percentage	52.33%	46.86%
Swing	▼2.70%	▲3.32%
- Democratic gain Republican gain Democratic hold Republican hold 50–60% 60–70% 70–80% 80–90% >90% 50–60% 60–70% 70–80% 80–90% >90%
Speaker before election
Dan Rayfield
Democratic
Elected Speaker
Dan Rayfield
Democratic

The 2022 Oregon House of Representatives election was held on Tuesday, November 8, 2022. Primary elections were held on Tuesday, May 17, 2022. Voters in the 60 districts of the Oregon House of Representatives elected their representatives. The elections coincided with the elections for other offices, including for State Senate.

In total, 21 freshman representatives were elected in this cycle, 20 of them due to retirements, making up over a third of the chamber.

== Background ==
The Democratic Party had controlled the Oregon House of Representatives since 2013.

== Retirements ==
=== Democrats ===
1. District 11: Marty Wilde retired.
2. District 21: Chris Hoy retired.
3. District 22: Teresa Alonso Leon retired to run for U. S. representative from Oregon's 6th congressional district.
4. District 27: Sheri Schouten retired.
5. District 28: Wlnsvey Campos retired to run for state senator from District 18.
6. District 37: Rachel Prusak retired.
7. District 38: Andrea Salinas retired to run for U. S. representative from Oregon's 6th congressional district.
8. District 40: Mark Meek retired to run for state senator from District 20.
9. District 41: Karin Power retired.
10. District 45: Barbara Smith Warner retired.
11. District 48: Jeff Reardon retired.
12. District 52: Anna Williams retired.

=== Republicans ===
1. District 4: Duane Stark retired.
2. District 7: Cedric Hayden retired to run for state senator from District 6.
3. District 19: Raquel Moore-Green retired to run for state senator from District 10.
4. District 24: Ron Noble retired to run for U. S. representative from Oregon's 6th congressional district.
5. District 25: Jessica George retired.
6. District 32: Suzanne Weber retired to run for state senator from District 16.
7. District 53: Jack Zika retired.
8. District 59: Daniel Bonham retired to run for state senator from District 26.

== Incumbents defeated ==
=== In primaries ===
==== Democrats ====
1. District 19: Brad Witt lost renomination to Tom Andersen after moving from District 31.

== Predictions ==
Source	Ranking	As of
Sabato's Crystal Ball	Likely D	May 19, 2022

== Results summary ==
Results shaded by % of vote.

Results
Affiliation	Candidates	Votes	Vote %	Seats Won
Democratic	55	981,568	52.33%	35
Republican	60	878,962	46.86%	25
Libertarian	4	6,085	0.32%	0
Constitution	2	1,073	0.06%	0
Progressive	1	2,837	0.15%	0
Write-in	N/A	5,028	0.27%	0
Total	122	1,875,553	100%	60

== Close races ==
Districts where the margin of victory was under 10%:

1. District 7, 4.13% (gain)
2. District 19, 8.93% (gain)
3. District 21, 5.75%
4. District 22, 3.2%
5. District 26, 6.55%
6. District 29, 7.28%
7. District 32, 2.42%
8. District 40, 0.55%
9. District 48, 2.56%
10. District 49, 4.29%
11. District 50, 3.65%
12. District 52, 5.04% (gain)
13. District 53, 1.31% (gain)

== Results by district ==
=== 1st District ===
1st district Democratic primary
Party	Candidate	Votes	%
Democratic	Bret Cecil	4,078	96.48
Write-in		149	3.52
Total votes		4,227	100%

1st district Republican primary
Party	Candidate	Votes	%
Republican	David Brock Smith (incumbent)	8,444	98.07
Write-in		166	1.93
Total votes		8,610	100%

1st district general election
Party	Candidate	Votes	%
Republican	David Brock Smith (incumbent)	25,451	70.53
Democratic	Bret Cecil	10,536	29.20
Write-in		96	0.27
Total votes		36,083	100%

=== 2nd District ===
2nd district Democratic primary
Party	Candidate	Votes	%
Democratic	Rainey S. Lambert	3,251	95.96
Write-in		137	4.04
Total votes		3,388	100%

2nd district Republican primary
Party	Candidate	Votes	%
Republican	Virgle Osborne	8,362	98.09
Write-in		163	1.91
Total votes		8,525	100%

2nd district general election
Party	Candidate	Votes	%
Republican	Virgle Osborne	23,500	70.06
Democratic	Rainey S. Lambert	9,123	27.20
Constitution	Edward Renfroe	841	2.51
Write-in		78	0.23
Total votes		33,542	100%

=== 3rd District ===
3rd district Democratic primary
Party	Candidate	Votes	%
Democratic	Bradley W. Keister	3,887	97.35
Write-in		106	2.65
Total votes		3,993	100%

3rd district Republican primary
Party	Candidate	Votes	%
Republican	Lily Morgan (incumbent)	7,897	97.12
Write-in		234	2.88
Total votes		8,131	100%

3rd district general election
Party	Candidate	Votes	%
Republican	Lily Morgan (incumbent)	22,206	68.16
Democratic	Bradley W. Keister	10,311	31.65
Write-in		63	0.19
Total votes		32,580	100%

=== 4th District ===
4th district Democratic primary
Party	Candidate	Votes	%
Democratic	Christine Goodwin (write-in)	48	15.00
Write-in		272	85.00
Total votes		320	100%

4th district Republican primary
Party	Candidate	Votes	%
Republican	Christine Goodwin (incumbent)	7,940	97.95
Write-in		166	2.05
Total votes		8,106	100%

4th district general election
Party	Candidate	Votes	%
Republican	Christine Goodwin (incumbent)	23,634	97.16
Write-in		691	2.84
Total votes		24,325	100%

=== 5th District ===
5th district Democratic primary
Party	Candidate	Votes	%
Democratic	Pam Marsh (incumbent)	10,071	99.63
Write-in		37	0.37
Total votes		10,108	100%

5th district Republican primary
Party	Candidate	Votes	%
Republican	Sandra A. Abercrombie	3,972	98.29
Write-in		69	1.71
Total votes		4,041	100%

5th district general election
Party	Candidate	Votes	%
Democratic	Pam Marsh (incumbent)	23,063	64.36
Republican	Sandra A. Abercrombie	12,740	35.55
Write-in		29	0.08
Total votes		35,832	100%

=== 6th District ===
6th district Democratic primary
Party	Candidate	Votes	%
Democratic	Dan Davis	3,466	97.03
Write-in		106	2.97
Total votes		3,572	100%

6th district Republican primary
Party	Candidate	Votes	%
Republican	Kim Wallan (incumbent)	5,282	98.90
Write-in		59	1.10
Total votes		5,341	100%

6th district general election
Party	Candidate	Votes	%
Republican	Kim Wallan (incumbent)	16,683	60.21
Democratic	Dan Davis	10,996	39.69
Write-in		29	0.10
Total votes		27,708	100%

=== 7th District ===
7th district Democratic primary
Party	Candidate	Votes	%
Democratic	John Lively (incumbent)	5,513	97.78
Write-in		125	2.22
Total votes		5,638	100%

7th district Republican primary
Party	Candidate	Votes	%
Republican	Alan Stout	3,549	82.59
Republican	Raiph Huber	707	16.45
Write-in		41	0.95
Total votes		4,297	100%

7th district general election
Party	Candidate	Votes	%
Democratic	John Lively (incumbent)	15,141	51.72
Republican	Alan Stout	13,934	47.59
Write-in		202	0.69
Total votes		29,277	100%

=== 8th District ===
8th district Democratic primary
Party	Candidate	Votes	%
Democratic	Paul R. Holvey (incumbent)	9,267	99.05
Write-in		89	0.95
Total votes		9,356	100%

8th district Republican primary
Party	Candidate	Votes	%
Republican	Michael F. Moore	904	95.46
Write-in		43	4.54
Total votes		947	100%

8th district general election
Party	Candidate	Votes	%
Democratic	Paul R. Holvey (incumbent)	24,696	84.73
Republican	Michael F. Moore	4,376	15.01
Write-in		75	0.25
Total votes		29,147	100%

=== 9th District ===
9th district Democratic primary
Party	Candidate	Votes	%
Democratic	Jerry Rust (write-in)	397	30.94
Write-in		886	69.06
Total votes		1,283	100%

9th district Republican primary
Party	Candidate	Votes	%
Republican	Boomer Wright (incumbent)	7,241	99.14
Write-in		63	0.86
Total votes		7,304	100%

9th district general election
Party	Candidate	Votes	%
Republican	Boomer Wright (incumbent)	20,686	60.07
Democratic	Jerry Rust	13,705	39.80
Write-in		45	0.13
Total votes		34,436	100%

=== 10th District ===
10th district Democratic primary
Party	Candidate	Votes	%
Democratic	David Gomberg (incumbent)	8,376	98.40
Write-in		136	1.60
Total votes		8,512	100%

10th district Republican primary
Party	Candidate	Votes	%
Republican	Celeste McEntee	5,368	98.28
Write-in		94	1.72
Total votes		5,462	100%

10th district general election
Party	Candidate	Votes	%
Democratic	David Gomberg (incumbent)	21,158	56.69
Republican	Celeste McEntee	16,115	43.18
Write-in		50	0.13
Total votes		37,323	100%

=== 11th District ===
11th district Democratic primary
Party	Candidate	Votes	%
Democratic	Mary K. Cooke	1,119	35.11
Democratic	Renee Windsor-White	975	30.77
Democratic	Nina Brenner	942	29.73
Write-in		133	0.42
Total votes		3,169	100%

11th district Republican primary
Party	Candidate	Votes	%
Republican	Jami Cate (incumbent)	8,126	85.17
Republican	Tyler S. Collins	1,384	14.51
Write-in		31	0.32
Total votes		9,541	100%

11th district general election
Party	Candidate	Votes	%
Republican	Jami Cate (incumbent)	24,892	74.50
Democratic	Mary K. Cooke	8,458	25.32
Write-in		60	0.18
Total votes		33,410	100%

=== 12th District ===
12th district Democratic primary
Party	Candidate	Votes	%
Democratic	Michelle Emmons	5,108	97.99
Write-in		105	2.01
Total votes		5,213	100%

12th district Republican primary
Party	Candidate	Votes	%
Republican	Charlie Conrad	2,400	30.50
Republican	Nichole De Graff	2,301	29.25
Republican	Bill R. Ledford	1,926	24.48
Republican	Jeff Gowing	1,223	15.54
Write-in		18	0.23
Total votes		7,868	100%

12th district general election
Party	Candidate	Votes	%
Republican	Charlie Conrad	20,410	57.46
Democratic	Michelle Emmons	15,073	42.43
Write-in		40	0.11
Total votes		35,523	100%

=== 13th District ===
13th district Democratic primary
Party	Candidate	Votes	%
Democratic	Nancy Nathanson (incumbent)	8,809	98.82
Write-in		105	1.18
Total votes		8,914	100%

13th district Republican primary
Party	Candidate	Votes	%
Republican	Timothy S. Sutherland	3,321	98.14
Write-in		63	1.86
Total votes		3,384	100%

13th district general election
Party	Candidate	Votes	%
Democratic	Nancy Nathanson (incumbent)	23,543	65.21
Republican	Timothy S. Sutherland	12,501	34.63
Write-in		59	0.16
Total votes		36,103	100%

=== 14th District ===
14th district Democratic primary
Party	Candidate	Votes	%
Democratic	Julie Fahey (incumbent)	6,239	98.53
Write-in		93	1.47
Total votes		6,332	100%

14th district Republican primary
Party	Candidate	Votes	%
Republican	Stan Stubblefield	3,411	85.45
Republican	Caleb Clark	549	13.75
Write-in		32	0.80
Total votes		3,992	100%

14th district general election
Party	Candidate	Votes	%
Democratic	Julie Fahey (incumbent)	17,887	59.71
Republican	Stan Stubblefield	12,010	40.09
Write-in		59	0.20
Total votes		29,956	100%

=== 15th District ===
15th district Democratic primary
Party	Candidate	Votes	%
Democratic	Benjamin Watts	4,943	98.04
Write-in		99	1.96
Total votes		5,042	100%

15th district Republican primary
Party	Candidate	Votes	%
Republican	Shelly Boshart Davis (incumbent)	6,780	99.04
Write-in		66	0.96
Total votes		6,846	100%

15th district general election
Party	Candidate	Votes	%
Republican	Shelly Boshart Davis (incumbent)	19,995	60.00
Democratic	Benjamin Watts	13,300	39.90
Write-in		35	0.11
Total votes		33,330	100%

=== 16th District ===
16th district Democratic primary
Party	Candidate	Votes	%
Democratic	Dan Rayfield (incumbent)	9,086	99.19
Write-in		74	0.81
Total votes		9,160	100%

16th district Republican primary
Party	Candidate	Votes	%
Republican	Keith Lembke	2,319	97.72
Write-in		54	2.28
Total votes		2,373	100%

16th district general election
Party	Candidate	Votes	%
Democratic	Dan Rayfield (incumbent)	22,483	75.17
Republican	Keith Lembke	7,362	24.61
Write-in		65	0.22
Total votes		29,910	100%

=== 17th District ===
17th district Democratic primary
Party	Candidate	Votes	%
Democratic	Ed Diehl (write-in)	57	13.73
Write-in		358	86.27
Total votes		415	100%

17th district Republican primary
Party	Candidate	Votes	%
Republican	Ed Diehl	6,783	70.97
Republican	Beth Jones	2,736	28.63
Write-in		38	0.40
Total votes		9,557	100%

17th district general election
Party	Candidate	Votes	%
Republican	Ed Diehl	21,741	96.70
Write-in		742	3.30
Total votes		22,483	100%

=== 18th District ===
18th district Democratic primary
Party	Candidate	Votes	%
Democratic	Jesse S. Smith	3,595	97.40
Write-in		96	2.60
Total votes		3,691	100%

18th district Republican primary
Party	Candidate	Votes	%
Republican	Rick Lewis (incumbent)	7,048	99.06
Write-in		67	0.94
Total votes		7,115	100%

18th district general election
Party	Candidate	Votes	%
Republican	Rick Lewis (incumbent)	24,352	71.09
Democratic	Jesse S. Smith	9,863	28.79
Write-in		40	0.12
Total votes		34,255	100%

=== 19th District ===
19th district Democratic primary
Party	Candidate	Votes	%
Democratic	Tom Andersen	2,592	36.46
Democratic	Jackie Leung	2,285	32.14
Democratic	Brad Witt (incumbent)	2,188	30.77
Write-in		45	0.63
Total votes		7,110	100%

19th district Republican primary
Party	Candidate	Votes	%
Republican	TJ Sullivan	3,937	98.62
Write-in		55	1.38
Total votes		3,992	100%

19th district general election
Party	Candidate	Votes	%
Democratic	Tom Andersen	15,289	54.39
Republican	TJ Sullivan	12,779	45.46
Write-in		40	0.14
Total votes		28,108	100%

=== 20th District ===
20th district Democratic primary
Party	Candidate	Votes	%
Democratic	Paul Evans (incumbent)	7,058	98.71
Write-in		92	1.29
Total votes		7,150	100%

20th district Republican primary
Party	Candidate	Votes	%
Republican	Dan Farrington	5,047	98.61
Write-in		71	1.39
Total votes		5,118	100%

20th district general election
Party	Candidate	Votes	%
Democratic	Paul Evans (incumbent)	17,316	54.24
Republican	Dan Farrington	14,077	44.09
Libertarian	Taylor A. Rickey	502	1.57
Write-in		32	0.10
Total votes		31,927	100%

=== 21st District ===
21st district Democratic primary
Party	Candidate	Votes	%
Democratic	Ramiro Navarro Jr.	3,394	63.80
Democratic	Robert Husseman	1,848	34.74
Write-in		78	1.47
Total votes		5,320	100%

21st district Republican primary
Party	Candidate	Votes	%
Republican	Kevin L. Mannix	4,712	85.84
Republican	Kyler T. McNaught	749	13.65
Write-in		28	0.51
Total votes		5,489	100%

21st district general election
Party	Candidate	Votes	%
Republican	Kevin L. Mannix	13,115	51.38
Democratic	Ramiro Navarro Jr.	11,646	45.63
Libertarian	Michael Morrow	738	2.89
Write-in		26	0.10
Total votes		25,525	100%

=== 22nd District ===
22nd district Democratic primary
Party	Candidate	Votes	%
Democratic	Anthony Medina	2,706	98.33
Write-in		46	1.67
Total votes		2,752	100%

22nd district Republican primary
Party	Candidate	Votes	%
Republican	Tracy M. Cramer	2,323	68.91
Republican	Jim Lowder	1,048	31.09
Write-in		23	0.68
Total votes		3,371	100%

22nd district general election
Party	Candidate	Votes	%
Republican	Tracy M. Cramer	8,742	51.49
Democratic	Anthony Medina	8,200	48.29
Write-in		37	0.22
Total votes		16,979	100%

=== 23rd District ===
23rd district Democratic primary
Party	Candidate	Votes	%
Democratic	Kriss Wright	3,423	53.33
Democratic	Hollamon Elise Yarnell	2,886	44.96
Write-in		110	1.71
Total votes		6,419	100%

23rd district Republican primary
Party	Candidate	Votes	%
Republican	Anna M. Scharf (incumbent)	7,446	98.49
Write-in		114	1.51
Total votes		7,560	100%

23rd district general election
Party	Candidate	Votes	%
Republican	Anna M. Scharf (incumbent)	22,294	63.18
Democratic	Kriss Wright	12,900	36.56
Write-in		91	0.26
Total votes		35,285	100%

=== 24th District ===
24th district Democratic primary
Party	Candidate	Votes	%
Democratic	Victoria Ernst	4,689	98.03
Write-in		94	1.97
Total votes		4,783	100%

24th district Republican primary
Party	Candidate	Votes	%
Republican	Lucetta A. Elmer	5,291	98.20
Write-in		97	1.80
Total votes		5,388	100%

24th district general election
Party	Candidate	Votes	%
Republican	Lucetta A. Elmer	17,030	56.23
Democratic	Victoria Ernst	13,216	43.63
Write-in		43	0.14
Total votes		30,289	100%

=== 25th District ===
25th district Democratic primary
Party	Candidate	Votes	%
Democratic	Ben Bowman	6,818	98.67
Write-in		92	1.33
Total votes		6,910	100%

25th district Republican primary
Party	Candidate	Votes	%
Republican	Bob Niemeyer	2,212	54.03
Republican	Gabriel Buehler	1,835	44.82
Write-in		47	1.15
Total votes		4,094	100%

25th district general election
Party	Candidate	Votes	%
Democratic	Ben Bowman	20,636	65.31
Republican	Bob Niemeyer	10,907	34.52
Write-in		56	0.18
Total votes		31,599	100%

=== 26th District ===
26th district Democratic primary
Party	Candidate	Votes	%
Democratic	Courtney Neron (incumbent)	5,953	98.76
Write-in		75	1.24
Total votes		6,028	100%

26th district Republican primary
Party	Candidate	Votes	%
Republican	Jason Fields	3,592	64.71
Republican	Glenn Lancaster	1,910	34.41
Write-in		49	0.88
Total votes		5,551	100%

26th district general election
Party	Candidate	Votes	%
Democratic	Courtney Neron (incumbent)	17,606	53.24
Republican	Jason Fields	15,439	46.69
Write-in		24	0.07
Total votes		33,069	100%

=== 27th District ===
27th district Democratic primary
Party	Candidate	Votes	%
Democratic	Ken Helm (incumbent)	5,781	60.06
Democratic	Tammy Carpenter	3,811	39.59
Write-in		33	0.34
Total votes		9,625	100%

27th district Republican primary
Party	Candidate	Votes	%
Republican	Sandra Nelson	2,384	97.35
Write-in		65	2.65
Total votes		2,449	100%

27th district general election
Party	Candidate	Votes	%
Democratic	Ken Helm (incumbent)	22,375	71.21
Republican	Sandra Nelson	9,007	28.67
Write-in		37	0.12
Total votes		31,419	100%

=== 28th District ===
28th district Democratic primary
Party	Candidate	Votes	%
Democratic	Dacia Grayber (incumbent)	10,997	99.46
Write-in		60	0.54
Total votes		11,057	100%

28th district Republican primary
Party	Candidate	Votes	%
Republican	Patrick Castles	1,189	53.78
Republican	Charles Mengis	968	44.12
Write-in		37	1.69
Total votes		2,194	100%

28th district general election
Party	Candidate	Votes	%
Democratic	Dacia Grayber (incumbent)	30,483	81.98
Republican	Patrick Castles	6,662	17.92
Write-in		39	0.10
Total votes		37,184	100%

=== 29th District ===
29th district Democratic primary
Party	Candidate	Votes	%
Democratic	Susan McLain (incumbent)	4,596	98.04
Write-in		92	1.96
Total votes		4,688	100%

29th district Republican primary
Party	Candidate	Votes	%
Republican	Gina Munster-Moore	3,179	97.67
Write-in		76	2.33
Total votes		3,255	100%

29th district general election
Party	Candidate	Votes	%
Democratic	Susan McLain (incumbent)	13,592	53.57
Republican	Gina Munster-Moore	11,746	46.29
Write-in		35	0.14
Total votes		25,373	100%

=== 30th District ===
30th district Democratic primary
Party	Candidate	Votes	%
Democratic	Nathan Sosa (incumbent)	4,839	98.65
Write-in		66	1.35
Total votes		4,905	100%

30th district Republican primary
Party	Candidate	Votes	%
Republican	Joe Everton	2,036	62.76
Republican	Todd Morrill	1,182	36.44
Write-in		26	0.80
Total votes		3,244	100%

30th district general election
Party	Candidate	Votes	%
Democratic	Nathan Sosa (incumbent)	15,572	61.70
Republican	Joe Everton	9,632	38.16
Write-in		34	0.13
Total votes		25,239	100%

=== 31st District ===
31st district Democratic primary
Party	Candidate	Votes	%
Democratic	Anthony Sorace	5,312	97.70
Write-in		125	2.30
Total votes		5,437	100%

31st district Republican primary
Party	Candidate	Votes	%
Republican	Brian Stout	4,756	63.31
Republican	Drew A. Layda	2,720	36.21
Write-in		36	0.48
Total votes		7,512	100%

31st district general election
Party	Candidate	Votes	%
Republican	Brian Stout	22,026	59.31
Democratic	Anthony Sorace	15,031	40.48
Write-in		77	0.21
Total votes		37,134	100%

=== 32nd District ===
32nd district Democratic primary
Party	Candidate	Votes	%
Democratic	Logan Laity	6,210	98.06
Write-in		123	1.94
Total votes		6,333	100%

32nd district Republican primary
Party	Candidate	Votes	%
Republican	Cyrus Javadi	3,676	58.22
Republican	Glenn H. Gaither	2,597	41.13
Write-in		41	0.65
Total votes		6,314	100%

32nd district general election
Party	Candidate	Votes	%
Republican	Cyrus Javadi	17,846	51.15
Democratic	Logan Laity	17,002	48.73
Write-in		41	0.12
Total votes		34,889	100%

=== 33rd District ===
33rd district Democratic primary
Party	Candidate	Votes	%
Democratic	Maxine E. Dexter (incumbent)	9,021	99.45
Write-in		50	0.55
Total votes		9,071	100%

33rd district Republican primary
Party	Candidate	Votes	%
Republican	Stan Baumhofer	878	98.87
Write-in		10	1.13
Total votes		888	100%

33rd district general election
Party	Candidate	Votes	%
Democratic	Maxine E. Dexter (incumbent)	26,154	84.82
Republican	Stan Baumhofer	4,651	15.08
Write-in		30	0.10
Total votes		30,835	100%

=== 34th District ===
34th district Democratic primary
Party	Candidate	Votes	%
Democratic	Lisa Reynolds (incumbent)	5,890	84.82
Democratic	Jennifer Kinzey	1,022	14.72
Write-in		32	0.46
Total votes		6,944	100%

34th district Republican primary
Party	Candidate	Votes	%
Republican	John Woods	2,331	98.56
Write-in		34	1.44
Total votes		2,365	100%

34th district general election
Party	Candidate	Votes	%
Democratic	Lisa Reynolds (incumbent)	19,354	68.67
Republican	John Woods	8,801	31.23
Write-in		30	0.11
Total votes		28,185	100%

=== 35th District ===
35th district Democratic primary
Party	Candidate	Votes	%
Democratic	Farrah Chaichi	2,857	58.82
Democratic	Zeloszelos Marchandt	1,953	40.28
Write-in		39	0.80
Total votes		4,849	100%

35th district Republican primary
Party	Candidate	Votes	%
Republican	Daniel R. Martin	1,482	97.18
Write-in		43	2.82
Total votes		1,525	100%

35th district general election
Party	Candidate	Votes	%
Democratic	Farrah Chaichi	14,365	67.17
Republican	Daniel R. Martin	6,963	32.56
Write-in		58	0.27
Total votes		21,386	100%

=== 36th District ===
36th district Democratic primary
Party	Candidate	Votes	%
Democratic	Hai Pham	5,694	98.77
Write-in		71	1.23
Total votes		5,765	100%

36th district Republican primary
Party	Candidate	Votes	%
Republican	Jeffrey S. Hindley	3,248	98.28
Write-in		57	1.72
Total votes		3,305	100%

36th district general election
Party	Candidate	Votes	%
Democratic	Hai Pham	19,629	61.43
Republican	Greer Trice	12,272	38.41
Write-in		52	0.16
Total votes		31,953	100%

=== 37th District ===
37th district Democratic primary
Party	Candidate	Votes	%
Democratic	Jules Walters	7,109	98.67
Write-in		96	1.33
Total votes		7,205	100%

37th district Republican primary
Party	Candidate	Votes	%
Republican	Aeric Estep	3,959	98.53
Write-in		59	1.47
Total votes		4,018	100%

37th district general election
Party	Candidate	Votes	%
Democratic	Jules Walters	20,588	59.15
Republican	Aeric Estep	14,177	40.73
Write-in		39	0.11
Total votes		34,804	100%

=== 38th District ===
38th district Democratic primary
Party	Candidate	Votes	%
Democratic	Daniel Nguyen	6,845	50.00
Democratic	Neelam Gupta	6,817	49.80
Write-in		28	0.20
Total votes		13,690	100%

38th district Republican primary
Party	Candidate	Votes	%
Republican	Alistair Firmin	2,678	98.71
Write-in		35	1.29
Total votes		2,713	100%

38th district general election
Party	Candidate	Votes	%
Democratic	Daniel Nguyen	25,949	67.98
Republican	Alistair Firmin	12,200	31.96
Write-in		22	0.06
Total votes		38,171	100%

=== 39th District ===
39th district Democratic primary
Party	Candidate	Votes	%
Democratic	Janelle S. Bynum (incumbent)	4,885	98.63
Write-in		68	1.37
Total votes		4,953	100%

39th district Republican primary
Party	Candidate	Votes	%
Republican	Kori Haynes	2,876	98.56
Write-in		42	1.44
Total votes		2,918	100%

39th district general election
Party	Candidate	Votes	%
Democratic	Janelle S. Bynum (incumbent)	15,678	54.96
Republican	Kori Haynes	12,801	44.87
Write-in		48	0.17
Total votes		28,527	100%

=== 40th District ===
40th district Democratic primary
Party	Candidate	Votes	%
Democratic	Annessa Hartman	4,433	58.22
Democratic	Charles A. Gallia	2,363	31.03
Democratic	James Farley	766	10.06
Write-in		52	0.68
Total votes		7,614	100%

40th district Republican primary
Party	Candidate	Votes	%
Republican	Adam Baker	3,281	59.74
Republican	Daniel Tooze Sr.	2,186	39.80
Write-in		25	0.46
Total votes		5,492	100%

40th district general election
Party	Candidate	Votes	%
Democratic	Annessa Hartman	16,632	50.22
Republican	Adam Baker	16,451	49.67
Write-in		35	0.10
Total votes		33,118	100%

=== 41st District ===
41st district Democratic primary
Party	Candidate	Votes	%
Democratic	Mark F. Gamba	10,270	69.42
Democratic	Kaliko Castille	4,233	28.61
Democratic	Christopher A. Draus	245	1.66
Write-in		46	0.31
Total votes		14,794	100%

41st district Republican primary
Party	Candidate	Votes	%
Republican	Rob Reynolds	1,343	46.31
Republican	Bob (Elvis) Clark	1,239	42.72
Republican	Rene Gomez	280	9.66
Write-in		38	1.31
Total votes		2,900	100%

41st district general election
Party	Candidate	Votes	%
Democratic	Mark F. Gamba	29,187	78.21
Republican	Rob Reynolds	8,088	21.67
Write-in		45	0.12
Total votes		37,320	100%

=== 42nd District ===
42nd district Democratic primary
Party	Candidate	Votes	%
Democratic	Rob Nosse (incumbent)	13,139	99.04
Write-in		127	0.96
Total votes		13,266	100%

42nd district Republican primary
Party	Candidate	Votes	%
Republican	Scott Trahan	441	96.50
Write-in		16	3.50
Total votes		457	100%

42nd district general election
Party	Candidate	Votes	%
Democratic	Rob Nosse (incumbent)	34,777	91.52
Republican	Scott Trahan	2,540	6.68
Libertarian	Shira Newman	619	1.63
Write-in		65	0.17
Total votes		38,001	100%

=== 43rd District ===
43rd district Democratic primary
Party	Candidate	Votes	%
Democratic	Tawna Sanchez (incumbent)	13,247	99.34
Write-in		88	0.66
Total votes		13,335	100%

43rd district Republican primary
Party	Candidate	Votes	%
Republican	Tim LeMaster	449	97.61
Write-in		11	2.39
Total votes		460	100%

43rd district general election
Party	Candidate	Votes	%
Democratic	Tawna Sanchez (incumbent)	33,466	91.80
Republican	Tim LeMaster	2,943	8.07
Write-in		48	0.13
Total votes		36,457	100%

=== 44th District ===
44th district Democratic primary
Party	Candidate	Votes	%
Democratic	Travis Nelson (incumbent)	10,271	91.35
Democratic	Eric Delehoy	948	8.43
Write-in		25	0.22
Total votes		11,244	100%

44th district Republican primary
Party	Candidate	Votes	%
Republican	Rolf Schuler (write-in)	12	11.11
Write-in		96	88.89
Total votes		108	100%

44th district general election
Party	Candidate	Votes	%
Democratic	Travis Nelson (incumbent)	26,429	87.65
Republican	Rolf Schuler	3,444	11.42
Constitution	Morgan Hinthorne	232	0.77
Write-in		47	0.16
Total votes		30,152	100%

=== 45th District ===
45th district Democratic primary
Party	Candidate	Votes	%
Democratic	Thuy Tran	10,657	72.61
Democratic	Catherine Thomasson	4,010	27.32
Write-in		11	0.07
Total votes		14,678	100%

45th district Republican primary
Party	Candidate	Votes	%
Republican	George Donnerberg (write-in)	50	21.19
Write-in		186	78.81
Total votes		236	100%

45th district general election
Party	Candidate	Votes	%
Democratic	Thuy Tran	28,946	84.07
Republican	George Donnerberg	5,465	15.87
Write-in		21	0.06
Total votes		34,432	100%

=== 46th District ===
46th district Democratic primary
Party	Candidate	Votes	%
Democratic	Khanh Pham (incumbent)	8,424	99.28
Write-in		61	0.72
Total votes		8,485	100%

46th district Republican primary
Party	Candidate	Votes	%
Republican	Timothy R. Sytsma	789	95.99
Write-in		33	4.01
Total votes		822	100%

46th district general election
Party	Candidate	Votes	%
Democratic	Khanh Pham (incumbent)	24,289	83.78
Republican	Timothy R. Sytsma	4,658	16.07
Write-in		44	0.15
Total votes		28,991	100%

=== 47th District ===
47th district Democratic primary
Party	Candidate	Votes	%
Democratic	Andrea Valderrama (incumbent)	4,891	99.37
Write-in		31	0.63
Total votes		4,922	100%

47th district Republican primary
Party	Candidate	Votes	%
Republican	William Stewart (write-in)	14	7.14
Write-in		182	92.86
Total votes		196	100%

47th district general election
Party	Candidate	Votes	%
Democratic	Andrea Valderrama (incumbent)	15,136	68.56
Republican	William Stewart	6,894	31.23
Write-in		46	0.21
Total votes		22,076	100%

=== 48th District ===
48th district Democratic primary
Party	Candidate	Votes	%
Democratic	Hoa H. Nguyen	3,854	98.72
Write-in		50	1.28
Total votes		3,904	100%

48th district Republican primary
Party	Candidate	Votes	%
Republican	John Masterman	2,521	98.71
Write-in		33	1.29
Total votes		2,554	100%

48th district general election
Party	Candidate	Votes	%
Democratic	Hoa H. Nguyen	12,329	51.24
Republican	John Masterman	11,712	48.68
Write-in		20	0.08
Total votes		24,061	100%

=== 49th District ===
49th district Democratic primary
Party	Candidate	Votes	%
Democratic	Zach Hudson (incumbent)	3,342	98.53
Write-in		50	1.47
Total votes		3,392	100%

49th district Republican primary
Party	Candidate	Votes	%
Republican	Randy E. Lauer	2,301	99.10
Write-in		21	0.90
Total votes		2,322	100%

49th district general election
Party	Candidate	Votes	%
Democratic	Zach Hudson (incumbent)	10,955	52.08
Republican	Randy E. Lauer	10,052	47.79
Write-in		27	0.13
Total votes		21,034	100%

=== 50th District ===
50th district Democratic primary
Party	Candidate	Votes	%
Democratic	Ricki Ruiz (incumbent)	4,175	98.89
Write-in		47	1.11
Total votes		4,222	100%

50th district Republican primary
Party	Candidate	Votes	%
Republican	Amelia Salvador	2,715	98.69
Write-in		36	1.31
Total votes		2,751	100%

50th district general election
Party	Candidate	Votes	%
Democratic	Ricki Ruiz (incumbent)	12,157	51.78
Republican	Amelia Salvador	11,298	48.13
Write-in		21	0.09
Total votes		23,476	100%

=== 51st District ===
51st district Democratic primary
Party	Candidate	Votes	%
Democratic	Walt Trandum	4,083	96.71
Write-in		139	3.29
Total votes		4,222	100%

51st district Republican primary
Party	Candidate	Votes	%
Republican	James Hieb (incumbent)	5,292	60.30
Republican	Lisa Davidson	3,445	39.25
Write-in		39	0.44
Total votes		8,776	100%

51st district general election
Party	Candidate	Votes	%
Republican	James Hieb (incumbent)	23,471	66.02
Democratic	Walt Trandum	11,968	33.66
Write-in		113	0.32
Total votes		35,552	100%

=== 52nd District ===
52nd district Democratic primary
Party	Candidate	Votes	%
Democratic	Darcy Long	5,981	98.10
Write-in		116	1.90
Total votes		6,097	100%

52nd district Republican primary
Party	Candidate	Votes	%
Republican	Jeff Helfrich	5,705	84.59
Republican	James Born	788	11.68
Republican	Britt Storkson	227	3.37
Write-in		24	0.36
Total votes		6,744	100%

52nd district general election
Party	Candidate	Votes	%
Republican	Jeff Helfrich	16,994	52.46
Democratic	Darcy Long	15,360	47.42
Write-in		40	0.12
Total votes		32,394	100%

=== 53rd District ===
53rd district Democratic primary
Party	Candidate	Votes	%
Democratic	Emerson Levy	6,907	99.08
Write-in		64	0.92
Total votes		6,971	100%

53rd district Republican primary
Party	Candidate	Votes	%
Republican	Michael Sipe	5,949	98.90
Write-in		66	1.10
Total votes		6,015	100%

53rd district general election
Party	Candidate	Votes	%
Democratic	Emerson Levy	19,584	50.61
Republican	Michael Sipe	19,075	49.30
Write-in		35	0.09
Total votes		38,694	100%

=== 54th District ===
54th district Democratic primary
Party	Candidate	Votes	%
Democratic	Jason Kropf (incumbent)	7,960	99.10
Write-in		72	0.90
Total votes		8,032	100%

54th district Republican primary
Party	Candidate	Votes	%
Republican	Judy Trego	3,724	98.39
Write-in		61	1.61
Total votes		3,785	100%

54th district general election
Party	Candidate	Votes	%
Democratic	Jason Kropf (incumbent)	22,865	64.42
Republican	Judy Trego	12,604	35.51
Write-in		27	0.08
Total votes		35,496	100%

=== 55th District ===
55th district Democratic primary
Party	Candidate	Votes	%
Democratic	Brian Lepore	3,539	97.44
Write-in		93	2.56
Total votes		3,632	100%

55th district Republican primary
Party	Candidate	Votes	%
Republican	E. Werner Reschke (incumbent)	8,037	98.16
Write-in		151	1.84
Total votes		8,188	100%

55th district general election
Party	Candidate	Votes	%
Republican	E. Werner Reschke (incumbent)	24,371	68.74
Democratic	Brian Lepore	11,041	31.14
Write-in		44	0.12
Total votes		35,456	100%

=== 56th District ===
56th district Democratic primary
Party	Candidate	Votes	%
Democratic	Jonathan P. Chenjeri	2,583	98.33
Write-in		44	1.67
Total votes		2,627	100%

56th district Republican primary
Party	Candidate	Votes	%
Republican	Emily McIntire	6,752	98.71
Write-in		88	1.29
Total votes		6,840	100%

56th district general election
Party	Candidate	Votes	%
Republican	Emily McIntire	21,425	72.60
Democratic	Jonathan P. Chenjeri	8,037	27.23
Write-in		49	0.17
Total votes		29,511	100%

=== 57th District ===
57th district Democratic primary
Party	Candidate	Votes	%
Democratic	Greg Smith (write-in)	93	32.86
Write-in		190	67.14
Total votes		283	100%

57th district Republican primary
Party	Candidate	Votes	%
Republican	Greg Smith (incumbent)	5,431	98.01
Write-in		110	1.99
Total votes		5,541	100%

57th district general election
Party	Candidate	Votes	%
Republican	Greg Smith (incumbent)	17,384	97.44
Write-in		457	2.56
Total votes		17,841	100%

=== 58th District ===
58th district Democratic primary
Party	Candidate	Votes	%
Democratic	Bobby Levy (write-in)	82	23.23
Write-in		271	76.77
Total votes		353	100%

58th district Republican primary
Party	Candidate	Votes	%
Republican	Bobby Levy (incumbent)	8,803	92.15
Republican	Skye Farnam	711	7.44
Write-in		39	0.41
Total votes		9,553	100%

58th district general election
Party	Candidate	Votes	%
Republican	Bobby Levy (incumbent)	23,274	83.66
Libertarian	Jesse Bonifer	4,226	15.19
Write-in		319	1.15
Total votes		27,819	100%

=== 59th District ===
59th district Democratic primary
Party	Candidate	Votes	%
Democratic	Lawrence Jones	3,583	97.52
Write-in		91	2.48
Total votes		3,674	100%

59th district Republican primary
Party	Candidate	Votes	%
Republican	Vikki Breese-Iverson (incumbent)	9,379	98.80
Write-in		114	1.20
Total votes		9,493	100%

59th district general election
Party	Candidate	Votes	%
Republican	Vikki Breese-Iverson (incumbent)	26,528	72.42
Democratic	Lawrence Jones	10,059	27.46
Write-in		45	0.12
Total votes		36,632	100%

=== 60th District ===
60th district Democratic primary
Party	Candidate	Votes	%
Democratic	Mark Owens (write-in)	138	34.33
Write-in		264	65.67
Total votes		402	100%

60th district Republican primary
Party	Candidate	Votes	%
Republican	Mark Owens (incumbent)	9,665	99.14
Write-in		84	0.86
Total votes		9,749	100%

60th district general election
Party	Candidate	Votes	%
Republican	Mark Owens (incumbent)	24,496	89.19
Progressive	Antonio Sunseri	2,837	10.33
Write-in		131	0.48
Total votes		27,464	100%

== See also ==
- 2022 Oregon elections
