= Kim Wallan =

American politician from Oregon

The Honorable Kim Wallan

Member of the Oregon House of Representatives from the 6th district
- Incumbent
- Assumed office January 14, 2019
- Preceded by: Sal Esquivel

Minority Whip of the Oregon House of Representatives
- Incumbent
- Assumed office 2019

Personal details
- Born: 1961 (64–65 years old)
- Party: Republican
- Spouse: Jim Wallan
- Children: 3
- Education: Willamette University (BS, JD)
- Profession: Lawyer, Politician

Kim Wallan (born 1961) is an American politician from Oregon. A Republican, she serves in the Oregon House of Representatives, representing House District 6 in Medford, Oregon. Wallan was first elected in 2018.

== Early life ==
Wallan grew up in Klamath Falls, Oregon.

== Education ==
Wallan earned a Bachelor of Science degree in Political Science from Willamette University. Wallan earned a JD degree in Law from Willamette University College of Law.

== Career ==
Wallan practiced law at a local law firm in Oregon for four years before choosing to become a stay-at-home mom. During this time she was an active community volunteer, including serving as a 4-H leader for 18 years.

Wallan served on the Medford School Board from 2011 to 2015 and was elected to the Medford City Council in November 2016.

In September 2017, Wallan announced that she would run for the Oregon House of Representatives seat representing District 6 to replace incumbent Representative Sal Esquivel, who chose to retire after serving in the role for 14 years. In the election the following year, she ran unopposed in the Republican primary and later defeated Democratic rival Michelle Blum Atkinson in the general election, securing 54% of the vote.

One of Wallan's key legislative priorities is to work on what she views as a fiscal shortfall the Oregon Public Employees Retirement System. In the 80th Oregon Legislative Assembly, Wallan serves on the Commission On Transparency Oregon Advisory Commission, the House Committee On Economic Development, the House Committee On Education, and the House Committee On Veterans and Emergency Preparedness.

== Personal life ==
Wallan's husband is Jim Wallan. They have three adult children: Sarah, Brett, and Eric Wallan and her family live in Medford, Oregon.

== Electoral history ==
2018 Oregon State Representative, 6th district
Party	Candidate	Votes	%
Republican	Kim Wallan	14,681	53.9
Democratic	Michelle Blum Atkinson	12,530	46.0
Write-in		32	0.1
Total votes		27,243	100%

2020 Oregon State Representative, 6th district
Party	Candidate	Votes	%
Republican	Kim Wallan	18,673	54.6
Democratic	Alberto Enriquez	14,748	43.1
Libertarian	Alex Levi Usselman	779	2.3
Write-in		21	0.1
Total votes		34,221	100%

2022 Oregon State Representative, 6th district
Party	Candidate	Votes	%
Republican	Kim Wallan	16,683	60.2
Democratic	Dan Davis	10,996	39.7
Write-in		29	0.1
Total votes		27,708	100%

2024 Oregon State Representative, 6th district
Party	Candidate	Votes	%
Republican	Kim Wallan	18,557	58.0
Democratic	Lilia Caballero	13,408	41.9
Write-in		40	0.1
Total votes		32,005	100%
