= George Gilman (Oregon politician) =

American politician

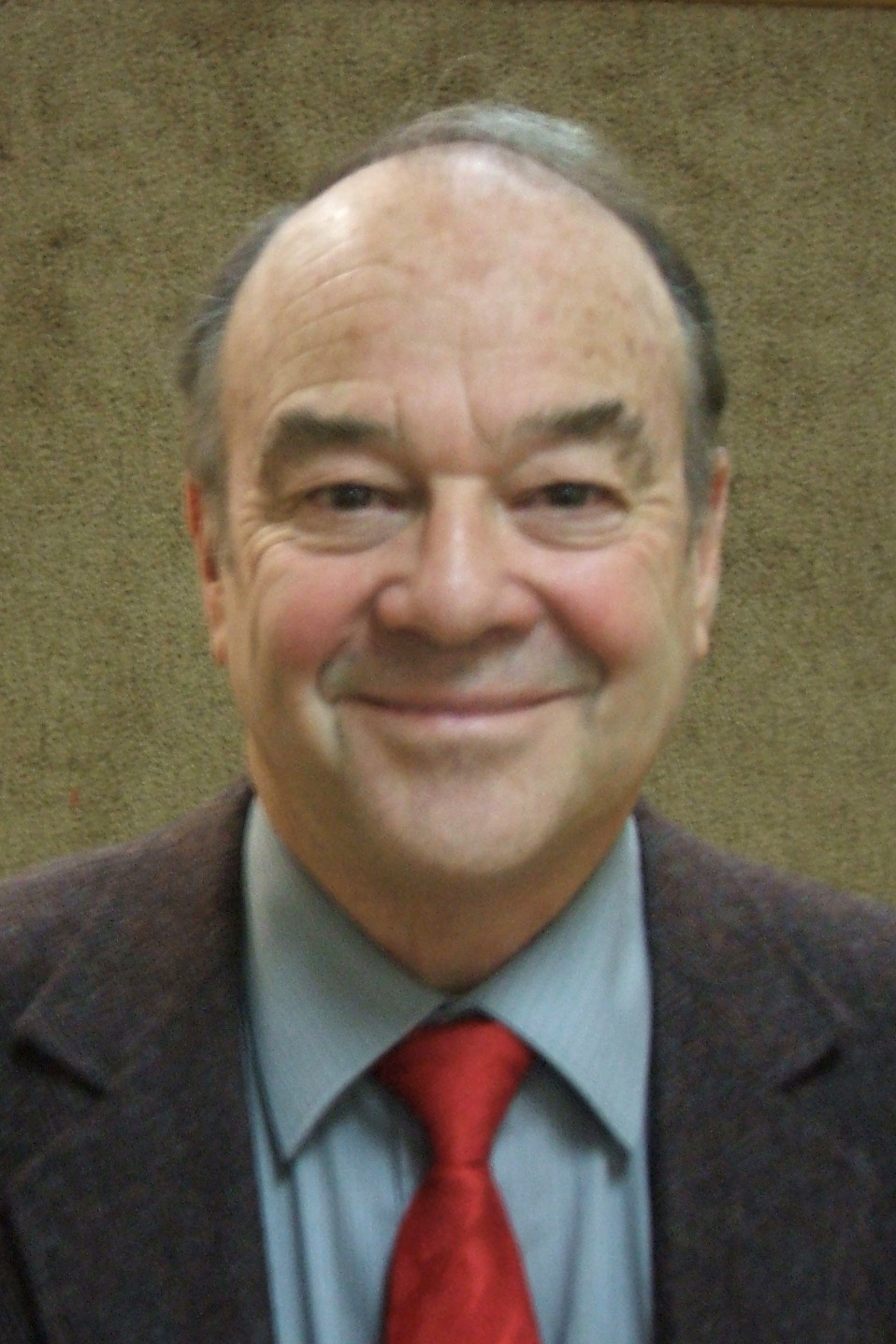

Member of the Oregon House of Representatives from the 55th district
- In office 2003–2011
- Succeeded by: Mike McLane

Personal details
- Born: 1939 Portland, Oregon
- Died: December 2, 2016 (aged 76–77)
- Party: Republican
- Spouse: Sandy Gilman (m. 1962)
- Education: Oregon State University; Southern Oregon University

George Gilman (1939 – December 2, 2016) was a politician from the U.S. state of Oregon. He served as the state representative for District 55 of the Oregon House of Representatives, the second largest House district in Oregon, from 2003 to 2011. A Republican, he served as vice-chair of the Transportation Committee as vice-chair and the Ways and Means Subcommittee on Transportation and Economic Development.

Gilman represented the people of Lake and Crook Counties and of portions of Jackson, Deschutes, and Klamath counties. He was elected to the newly created District 55 in November 2002, and was elected to a fourth term in 2008.

== Early life and education ==
Gilman was born in Portland, Oregon, and resided in Medford, graduating from Crater High School in Central Point, where he served as district treasurer in the Southern Oregon District of the Oregon FFA Association and received the Star Farmer Degree. He majored in dairy husbandry at Oregon State University, then returned home to attend to the family dairy farm, receiving his BS degree with honors from Southern Oregon College.

== Political career ==
In 1986, he was elected to represent House District 50, serving during the 1987-89 sessions. After retiring from the House of Representatives and leaving office, he was employed by Access, Inc., a community action agency, and next by Pacific Retirement Services, where he spent the next 11 years managing the Foster Grandparent Program in three southern Oregon counties.

== Personal life ==
He and his wife Sandy, who also served as his legislative assistant, were married in 1962, having two children and two grandchildren, both of whom have participated in his campaign activities. He died on December 2, 2016, due to leukemia.

== Electoral history ==
2004 Oregon State Representative, 55th district
Party	Candidate	Votes	%
Republican	George Gilman	22,271	97.7
Write-in		514	2.3
Total votes		22,785	100%

2006 Oregon State Representative, 55th district
Party	Candidate	Votes	%
Republican	George Gilman	16,491	97.5
Write-in		417	2.5
Total votes		16,908	100%

2008 Oregon State Representative, 55th district
Party	Candidate	Votes	%
Republican	George Gilman	19,638	98.2
Write-in		362	1.8
Total votes		20,000	100%
