= Mike McLane =

American politician

Member of the Oregon Senate from the 30th district
- Incumbent
- Assumed office January 13, 2025
- Preceded by: Lynn Findley

Judge of the Jefferson and Crook County Circuit Court
- In office July 1, 2019 – October 10, 2021
- Preceded by: Daniel J. Ahern
- Succeeded by: Wade L. Whiting

Minority Leader of Oregon House of Representatives
- In office January 14, 2013 – January 2, 2019
- Preceded by: Kevin Cameron
- Succeeded by: Carl Wilson

Member of the Oregon House of Representatives from the 55th district
- In office January 2011 – July 1, 2019
- Preceded by: George Gilman
- Succeeded by: Vikki Breese-Iverson

Personal details
- Party: Republican
- Education: Oregon State University (BS); Lewis and Clark College (JD)

Military service
- Allegiance: United States
- Branch/service: United States Army; United States Air Force
- Rank: Colonel
- Unit: Oregon Army National Guard; 41st Infantry Brigade (Sunset Brigade); Oregon Air National Guard; 173rd Fighter Wing

Michael R. McLane is an American politician and lawyer currently serving in the Oregon State Senate. A member of the Republican Party, he represents the 30th district, which covers parts of Eastern and Central Oregon. He previously served as a judge in the Jefferson and Crook County Circuit Court from 2019 until 2021, and in the Oregon House of Representatives from 2011 to 2019, including as House Republican Leader from 2013 to 2019. As of 2024, he was also a colonel in the Oregon Air National Guard.

== Early life and education ==
Born in Condon, Oregon, McLane graduated from Condon High School in 1983, and then from Oregon State University with a degree in Agricultural Resource Economics in 1987.

He earned a Juris Doctor degree from Lewis & Clark Law School and clerked for Justice W. Michael Gillette at the Oregon Supreme Court.

== Career ==
McLane represented House District 55 from 2011 to 2019, serving five terms, including six as House Republican Leader.

In May 2019, Governor Kate Brown appointed McLane to a vacancy on the Oregon Circuit Court for Jefferson and Crook Counties. He resigned from the bench effective October 10, 2021, and returned to private practice.

As of 2024, he was also a colonel in the Oregon Air National Guard, with more than 20 years of military service that also includes time in the Oregon Army National Guard.

=== Oregon State Senate ===
McLane represents District 30, which includes Baker, Crook, Grant, Harney, Lake, and Malheur countues and parts of Deschutes and Jefferson counties.

In November 2023, McLane announced his candidacy for the Oregon State Senate in District 30. Incumbent Lynn Findley, who endorsed McLane, announced he would not seek another term. McLane defeated rancher Douglas Muck and former soil and water district director Robert Neuman in the primary election. McLane was also nominated by the Democratic party as a write-in candidate in the primary, receiving 131 votes. He ran unopposed in the general election and was officially declared the winner after the November general election.

In the 2026 session, McLane was vice chair of the Senate Committee on Finance and Revenue, and a member of the Senate Committee on Judiciary and the Joint Committee on Legislative Senate Committee Appointments.

== Personal life ==
McLane lives on a small farm in Powell Butte. He is married with three children.

== Electoral history ==
2024 Oregon State Senator, 30th district
Party	Candidate	Votes	%
Republican	Mike McLane	56,886	98.4
Write-in		946	1.6
Total votes		57,832	100%

2024 Oregon State Senator, 30th district Republican primary
Party	Candidate	Votes	%
Republican	Mike McLane	13,332	67.3
Republican	Douglas Muck	4,808	24.3
Republican	Robert Neuman	1,598	8.1
Write-in		62	0.3
Total votes		19,800	100.0

2018 Oregon state representative, 55th district
Party	Candidate	Votes	%
Republican	Mike McLane	23,832	73.2
Democratic	Karen Rippberger	8,694	26.7
Write-in		37	0.1
Total votes		32,563	100%

2016 Oregon state representative, 55th district
Party	Candidate	Votes	%
Republican	Mike McLane	24,938	75.6
Democratic	Brie S Malarkey	7,951	24.1
Write-in		76	0.2
Total votes		32,965	100%

2014 Oregon state representative, 55th district
Party	Candidate	Votes	%
Republican	Mike McLane	17,689	72.4
Democratic	Richard V Phay	5,369	22.0
Libertarian	Frank W Brannen	1,310	5.4
Write-in		70	0.3
Total votes		24,438	100%

2012 Oregon state representative, 55th district
Party	Candidate	Votes	%
Republican	Mike McLane	18,836	67.9
Democratic	John Huddle	8,842	31.9
Write-in		55	0.2
Total votes		27,733	100%

2010 Oregon state representative, 55th district
Party	Candidate	Votes	%
Republican	Mike McLane	17,204	98.1
Write-in		337	1.9
Total votes		17,541	100%

Oregon House of Representatives
Preceded by Kevin Cameron	Minority Leader of the Oregon House of Representatives; 2013–2019	Succeeded by Carl Wilson
