= Gail Whitsett =

American politician

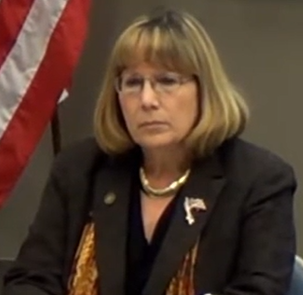
- Whitsett in 2015

Member of the Oregon House of Representatives from the 56th district
- In office January 14, 2013 – January 9, 2017
- Preceded by: Bill Garrard
- Succeeded by: E. Werner Reschke

Personal details
- Party: Republican

Gail Whitsett is a former member of the Oregon House of Representatives representing District 56 including Klamath Falls and surrounding sections of southern Klamath County and southern Lake County, Oregon. She is married to Doug Whitsett, a veterinarian who formerly served as a member of the Oregon State Senate. Gail was his chief of staff before being elected to office. The couple owns farmland in the Klamath Basin where they raise horses. They have been involved in policy negotiations over water issues.

Whitsett won the 2012 Republican nomination over Tracey Liskey. Whitsett opposes the Klamath Basin Restoration Agreement and the precedent it establishes for removing dams. She served on the Agriculture and Natural Resources Committee, Energy and Environment Committee and Human Services and Housing Committee. She is a geologist with Bachelor of Science and Master of Science degrees from Oregon State University.

== Electoral history ==
2012 Oregon State Representative, 56th district
Party	Candidate	Votes	%
Republican	Gail Whitsett	18,987	96.8
Write-in		630	3.2
Total votes		19,617	100%

2014 Oregon State Representative, 56th district
Party	Candidate	Votes	%
Republican	Gail D Whitsett	16,252	97.2
Write-in		462	2.8
Total votes		16,714	100%
