= Paul Holvey =

American politician

Speaker pro tempore of the Oregon House of Representatives
- In office January 9, 2017 – January 13, 2025
- Preceded by: Tobias Read
- Succeeded by: David Gomberg

Acting Speaker of the Oregon House of Representatives
- In office January 16, 2022 – February 1, 2022
- Preceded by: Tina Kotek
- Succeeded by: Dan Rayfield

Member of the Oregon House of Representatives from the 8th district
- In office January 2004 – January 13, 2025
- Preceded by: Floyd Prozanski
- Succeeded by: Lisa Fragala

Personal details
- Born: January 11, 1954 (age 72) Eugene, Oregon, U.S.
- Party: Democratic
- Education: Lane Community College; Central Washington University; University of Oregon

Paul Richard Holvey (born January 11, 1954) is an American politician who represented District 8 of the Oregon House of Representatives from 2004 until 2025. A member of the Democratic Party, he served as Speaker pro tempore of the house from 2017 until his retirement in 2025.

== Early career and education ==
Holvey began his career as an apprentice in the carpentry industry, which led him into later becoming a journeyman in the carpenters union. As a carpenter, foreman, and project superintendent, Holvey has worked in Oregon, Washington, California and Alaska. Holvey attended Lane Community College and Central Washington University, and received a certificate from the University of Oregon's Labor Education and Research Center.

== Oregon House ==
Holvey was appointed to the Oregon House of Representatives in January 2004, to replace Floyd Prozanski, who had resigned to accept an appointment to a seat in the state Senate. He was elected to the seat in November 2004.

On October 3, 2023, Holvey faced a recall election; the effort was spearheaded by a local chapter of the United Food and Commercial Workers union and was defeated by a large margin.

On February 29, 2024, Holvey announced his retirement after 20 years representing the 8th district.

== Family ==
Holvey and his wife Terrie reside in south Eugene along with their three Yorkshire Terriers. He also has a son, Justin, and daughter in-law, Carla.

== Electoral history ==
2004 Oregon State Representative, 8th district
Party	Candidate	Votes	%
Democratic	Paul R. Holvey	22,595	71.3
Republican	Bill Young	8,999	28.4
Write-in		75	0.2
Total votes		31,669	100%

2006 Oregon State Representative, 8th district
Party	Candidate	Votes	%
Democratic	Paul R. Holvey	18,481	77.0
Republican	Andrew Hill	5,460	22.7
Write-in		63	0.3
Total votes		24,004	100%

2008 Oregon State Representative, 8th district
Party	Candidate	Votes	%
Democratic	Paul R Holvey	23,366	98.0
Write-in		483	2.0
Total votes		23,849	100%

2010 Oregon State Representative, 8th district
Party	Candidate	Votes	%
Democratic	Paul R Holvey	17,715	72.8
Republican	Simone Gordon	6,581	27.0
Write-in		51	0.2
Total votes		24,347	100%

2012 Oregon State Representative, 8th district
Party	Candidate	Votes	%
Democratic	Paul R Holvey	21,681	70.6
Republican	Aaron Baker	8,014	26.1
Constitution	Lucian Blansett	946	3.1
Write-in		54	0.2
Total votes		30,695	100%

2014 Oregon State Representative, 8th district
Party	Candidate	Votes	%
Democratic	Paul R Holvey	19,202	96.6
Write-in		674	3.4
Total votes		19,876	100%

2016 Oregon State Representative, 8th district
Party	Candidate	Votes	%
Democratic	Paul R Holvey	24,300	69.3
Republican	Mary M Tucker	9,244	26.4
Libertarian	Martha Sherwood	1,434	4.1
Write-in		80	0.2
Total votes		35,058	100%

2018 Oregon State Representative, 8th district
Party	Candidate	Votes	%
Democratic	Paul R Holvey	25,835	79.8
Libertarian	Martha Sherwood	6,310	19.5
Write-in		210	0.6
Total votes		32,355	100%

2020 Oregon State Representative, 8th district
Party	Candidate	Votes	%
Democratic	Paul R Holvey	27,886	67.7
Republican	Timothy W Aldal	11,993	29.1
Libertarian	Martha A Sherwood	1,239	3.0
Write-in		76	0.2
Total votes		41,194	100%

2022 Oregon State Representative, 8th district
Party	Candidate	Votes	%
Democratic	Paul R Holvey	24,696	84.7
Republican	Michael F Moore	4,376	15.0
Write-in		75	0.3
Total votes		29,147	100%

Oregon House of Representatives
Preceded by Tobias Read	Speaker pro tempore of the Oregon House of Representatives; 2017–2025	Succeeded by David Gomberg
Political offices
Preceded by Tina Kotek	Speaker of the Oregon House of Representatives; Acting; 2022	Succeeded by Dan Rayfield
