= Sal Esquivel =

American businessman, real estate broker and politician from Oregon

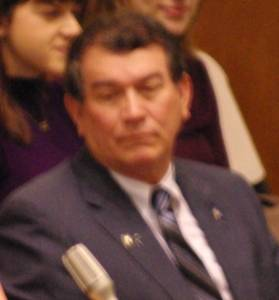

Member of the Oregon House of Representatives from the 6th district
- In office 2005–2019
- Preceded by: Rob Patridge
- Succeeded by: Kim Wallan

Member of the Oregon Senate from the 3rd district
- In office 2004–2005
- Preceded by: Lenn Hannon
- Succeeded by: Alan Bates

Personal details
- Born: May 19, 1948 (age 78) Pittsburg, California
- Party: Republican
- Spouse: Jan Esquivel
- Children: 5
- Occupation: Real estate broker, politician
- Military career
- Allegiance: United States
- Branch: United States Navy
- Service years: 1969 to 1970
- Website: Legislative website

Sal Esquivel (born May 19, 1948) is an American businessman, real estate broker and politician from Oregon. Esquivel is a former Republican member of Oregon House of Representatives and senator.

== Early life ==
Esquivel was born in Pittsburg, California and was raised in Medford, graduating from Medford High School in 1966.

== Education ==
Esquivel attended Southern Oregon College.

== Career ==
In military, Esquivel joined the United States Navy and served in the Vietnam War from 1969 to 1970.

After serving the military, Esquivel worked in the wood products industry in Medford, Oregon.

In 1982, Esquivel started Western States Parts and Equipment, a heavy equipment and parts distributor. Esquivel is a real estate broker.

Esquivel served on the Medford City Council until 2004, when he was appointed to the Oregon State Senate to complete the term of Lenn Hannon, who resigned to take a position on the Oregon state parole board. Later that year, Esquivel ran for and won an open seat Oregon House of Representatives. He has been re-elected four times.

In 2017, Esquivel co-sponsored House Bill 3328 along with Rep. Paul Evans that would strip veterans and disable veterans of their civil service preference upon ten years of being discharged from the military. The proposed bill did not take into consideration veterans using education benefit such as 38 U.S.C Ch. 30 or 33 GI Bills, or Vocational Rehabilitation 38 U.S.C Ch. 31. As of the close of the 2017 session the bill did not leave committee.

== Personal life ==
Esquivel's wife is Jan Esquivel. They have five children. Esquivel and his family live in Medford, Oregon.

== Electoral history ==
2004 Oregon State Representative, 6th district
Party	Candidate	Votes	%
Republican	Sal Esquivel	16,481	58.3
Democratic	John Doty	11,724	41.5
Write-in		56	0.2
Total votes		28,261	100%

2006 Oregon State Representative, 6th district
Party	Candidate	Votes	%
Republican	Sal Esquivel	11,423	51.9
Democratic	Mike Moran	10,541	47.9
Write-in		43	0.2
Total votes		22,007	100%

2008 Oregon State Representative, 6th district
Party	Candidate	Votes	%
Republican	Sal Esquivel	14,622	53.5
Democratic	Lynn Howe	12,638	46.3
Write-in		46	0.2
Total votes		27,306	100%

2010 Oregon State Representative, 6th district
Party	Candidate	Votes	%
Republican	Sal Esquivel	12,407	56.6
Democratic	Lynn Howe	9,468	43.2
Write-in		62	0.3
Total votes		21,937	100%

2012 Oregon State Representative, 6th district
Party	Candidate	Votes	%
Republican	Sal Esquivel	16,594	96.1
Write-in		676	3.9
Total votes		17,270	100%

2014 Oregon State Representative, 6th district
Party	Candidate	Votes	%
Republican	Sal Esquivel	15,329	95.9
Write-in		661	4.1
Total votes		15,990	100%

2016 Oregon State Representative, 6th district
Party	Candidate	Votes	%
Republican	Sal Esquivel	15,952	56.5
Democratic	Mike Moran	12,213	43.2
Write-in		75	0.3
Total votes		28,240	100%
