= Lisa Fragala =

American Democratic politician

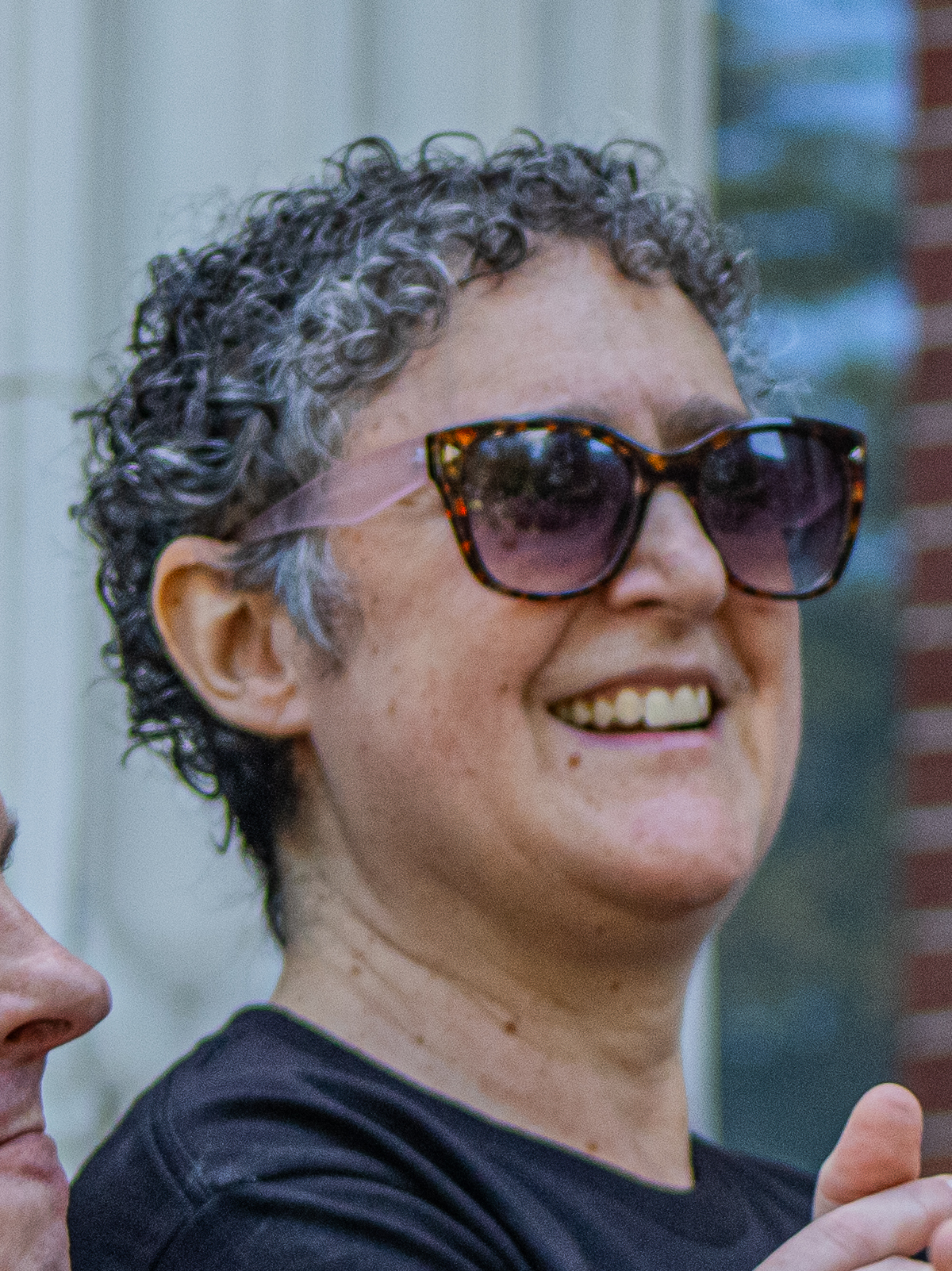

Member of the Oregon House of Representatives from the 8th district
- Incumbent
- Assumed office January 13, 2025
- Preceded by: Paul Holvey

Personal details
- Education: Binghamton University (B.A.); Oregon State University (M.A.)

Lisa Fragala is an American Democratic politician currently serving in the Oregon House of Representatives. She represents the 8th district, which is entirely contained within Lane County and is centered around downtown and south Eugene.

== Biography ==
Fragala has worked as an elementary school teacher in Eugene as well as a community partnership coordinator for the College of Education at Pacific University. She has also served on the board of directors for Lane Community College.

Fragala has experienced homelessness as a child.

== Electoral history ==
2024 Oregon State Representative, 8th district
Party	Candidate	Votes	%
Democratic	Lisa Fragala	24,811	97.4
Write-in		670	2.6
Total votes		25,481	100%
