= Rob Patridge =

American politician

Member of the Oregon House of Representatives from the 50th/6th district
- In office 1999–2005
- Preceded by: John Watt
- Succeeded by: Sal Esquivel

Personal details
- Party: Republican
- Education: Willamette University (JD)
- Profession: Attorney

Robert Wilson Patridge served in the Oregon House of Representatives from 1999 to 2005 as a Republican from Jackson County. Since 2013 he has served as the District Attorney of Klamath County and serves as the Chair of the Oregon Liquor Control Commission.
