= Bill Garrard =

American politician

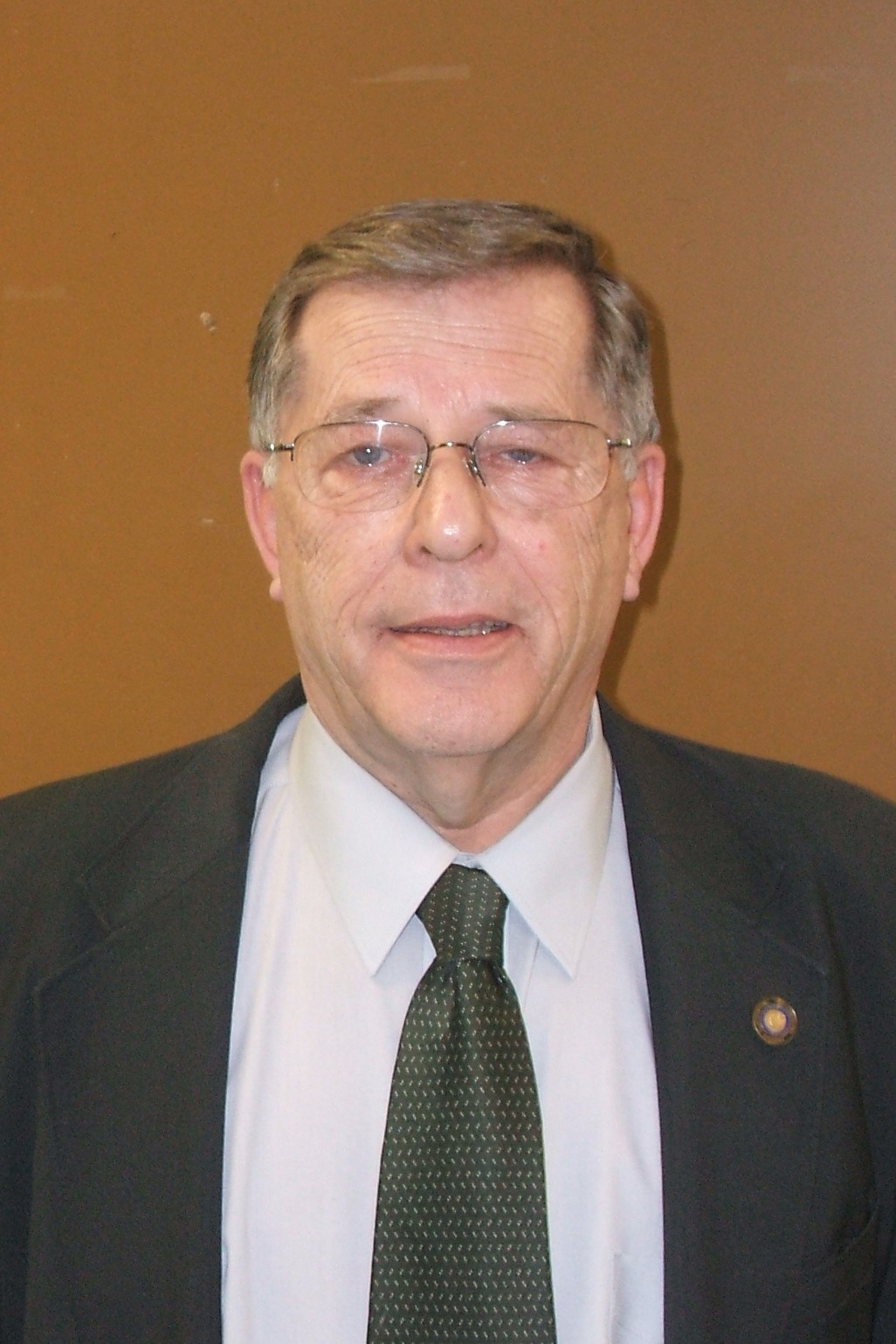

Member of the Oregon House of Representatives from the 56th district
- In office 2003–2013
- Preceded by: Patti Smith (before redistricting)
- Succeeded by: Gail Whitsett

Member of the Oregon House of Representatives from the 53rd district
- In office 2001–2003
- Preceded by: Steve Harper
- Succeeded by: Ben Westlund (after redistricting)

Personal details
- Born: May 10, 1940 Rochester, New York
- Died: November 28, 2022 (aged 82) Klamath Falls, Oregon
- Party: Republican
- Spouse: Sharon Garrard

Military service
- Branch/service: United States Air Force
- Years of service: 1958–1962

Bill Garrard (May 10, 1940 – November 28, 2022) was an American politician of the Republican Party. He was a member of the Oregon House of Representatives from 2001 to 2013. His district represented the voters in southern Klamath County, including Klamath Falls.

Before his election to as a Klamath Falls commissioner, Garrard worked for 40 years as a broadcaster in Klamath Falls.

== Electoral history ==
2004 Oregon State Representative, 56th district
Party	Candidate	Votes	%	±%
Republican	Bill Garrard (incumbent)	17,796	62.72	
Democratic	James Calvert	9,154	32.26	
	write-ins	82	0.29	
Total votes		27,032	100%	

2006 Oregon State Representative, 56th district
Party	Candidate	Votes	%	±%
Republican	Bill Garrard (incumbent)	13,759	66.60	+3.88
Democratic	James Calvert	6,855	33.18	+0.92
	write-ins	46	0.22	−0.07
Total votes		20,660	100%	

2008 Oregon State Representative, 56th district
Party	Candidate	Votes	%	±%
Republican	Bill Garrard (incumbent)	18,653	97.27	+30.67
	write-ins	523	2.73	+2.51
Total votes		19,176	100%	

2010 Oregon State Representative, 56th district
Party	Candidate	Votes	%	±%
Republican	Bill Garrard	15,402	96.7	−0.57%
Write-in		522	3.3	+0.57%
Total votes		15,924	100%	
