= Emily McIntire =

American politician

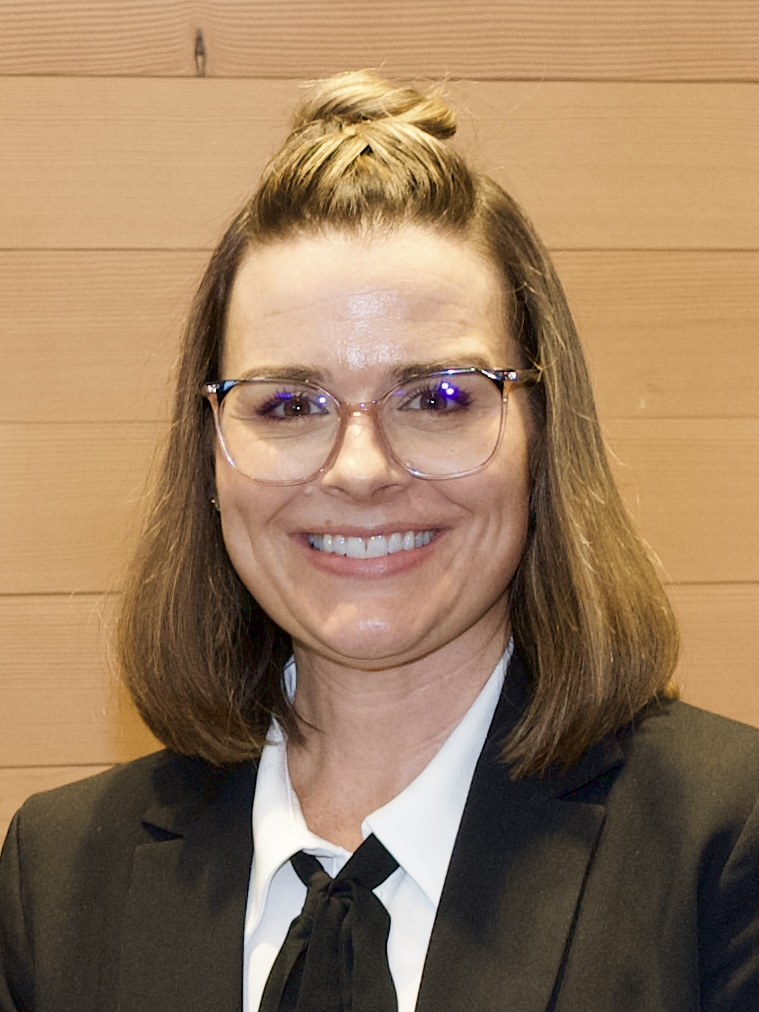
- McIntire in 2025

Member of the Oregon House of Representatives from the 56th district
- Incumbent
- Assumed office January 9, 2023
- Preceded by: E. Werner Reschke

Personal details
- Born: Jackson County, Oregon, U.S.
- Party: Republican
- Children: 2

Emily McIntire is an American Republican politician who serves the 56th district in the Oregon House of Representatives. She won the seat in the 2022 election against Democratic opponent Jonathan Chenjeri.

== Committees ==
She serves as a vice-chair on the Committee On Higher Education, the Joint Committee On Ways and Means, in the subcommittee of Education, and the Committee on Education.

== Political Positions ==
Following the Standoff at Eagle Pass, McIntire signed a letter in support of Texas Governor Greg Abbott's decision in the conflict.

== Electoral history ==
2022 Oregon State Representative, 56th district
Party	Candidate	Votes	%
Republican	Emily G McIntire	21,425	72.6
Democratic	Jonathan P Chenjeri	8,037	27.2
Write-in		49	0.2
Total votes		29,511	100%

2024 Oregon State Representative, 56th district
Party	Candidate	Votes	%
Republican	Emily G McIntire	25,285	96.7
Write-in		866	3.3
Total votes		26,151	100%
