= 2012 Oregon legislative election =

Oregon legislative elections, 2012
- November 6, 2012

16 seats of the Oregon State Senate and 60 seats of the Oregon House of Representatives
| | Majority party | Minority party |
|---|---|---|
| Party | Democratic | Republican |
| Seats before | 46 (16 in Senate, 30 in House) | 44 (14 Senate, 30 House) |
| Seats after | 50 (16 in Senate, 34 in House) | 40 (14 Senate, 26 House) |
| Seat change | ▲4 in Senate, ▲4 in House | ▼4 in Senate, ▼4 in House |

The 2012 elections for the Oregon Legislative Assembly determined the composition of both houses for the 77th Oregon Legislative Assembly. The Republican and Democratic primary elections were on May 15, 2012, and the general election was on November 6, 2012. Sixteen of the Oregon State Senate's 30 seats were up for election, as were all 60 seats of the Oregon House of Representatives.

In the Senate, the Democrats kept a 16–14 majority, identical to their advantage in the previous legislative session. In the House, Democrats took a 34–26 majority, up from a 30–30 split in the previous session.

== Oregon Senate ==
2012 Oregon State Senate elections
- November 6, 2012

16 of 30 seats in the Oregon State Senate 16 seats needed for a majority
| | Majority party | Minority party |
|---|---|---|
| Party | Democratic | Republican |
| Seats before | 16 | 14 |
| Seats after | 16 | 14 |
| Seat change | Steady | Steady |
| Popular vote | 434,590 | 399,077 |
| Percentage | 50.81% | 46.66% |
- Results of the elections: Democratic hold Republican hold No election

In the previous session, Democrats controlled the Senate with a 16–14 majority. Of the 16 seats up for election, eight were previously held by Democrats, and eight by Republicans.

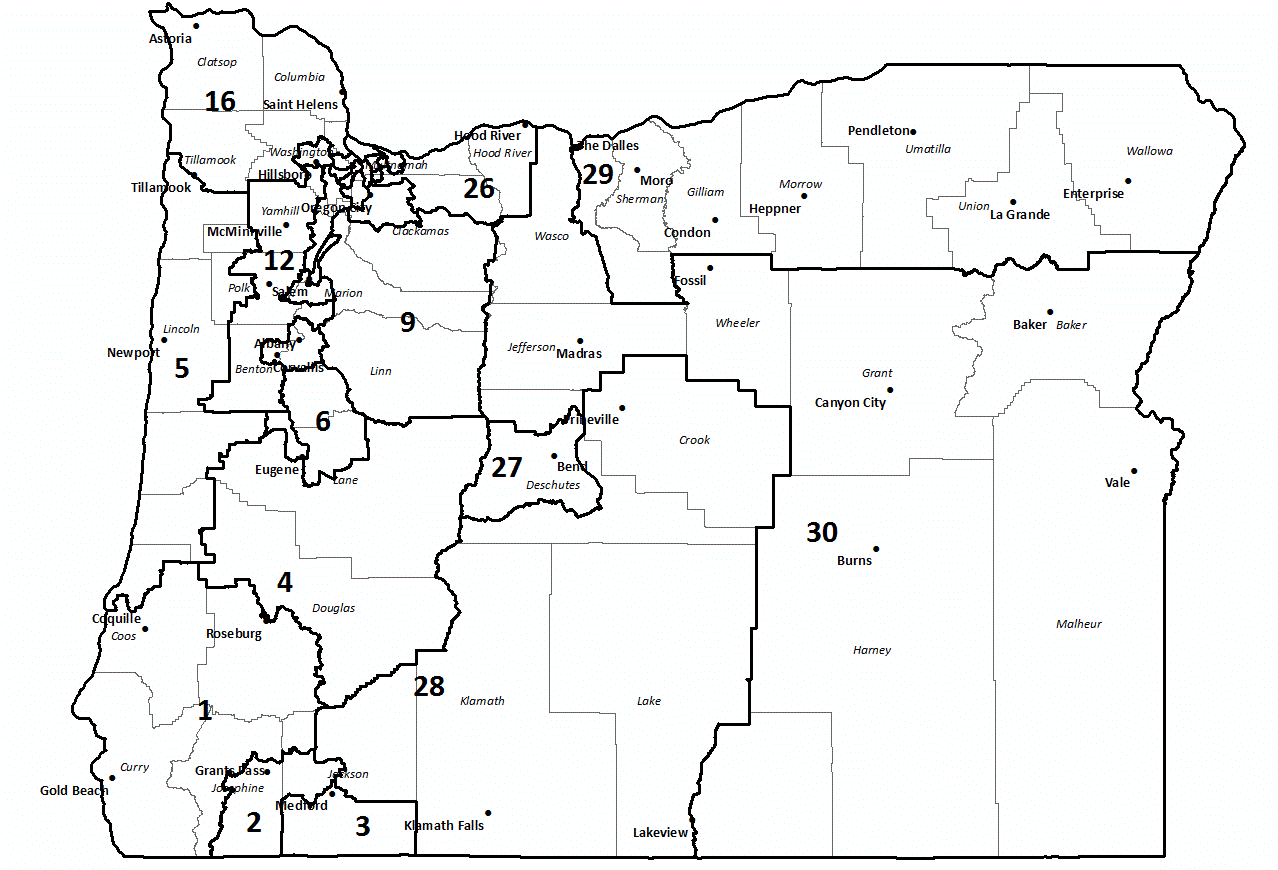
Statewide view of 2012 Senate Districts

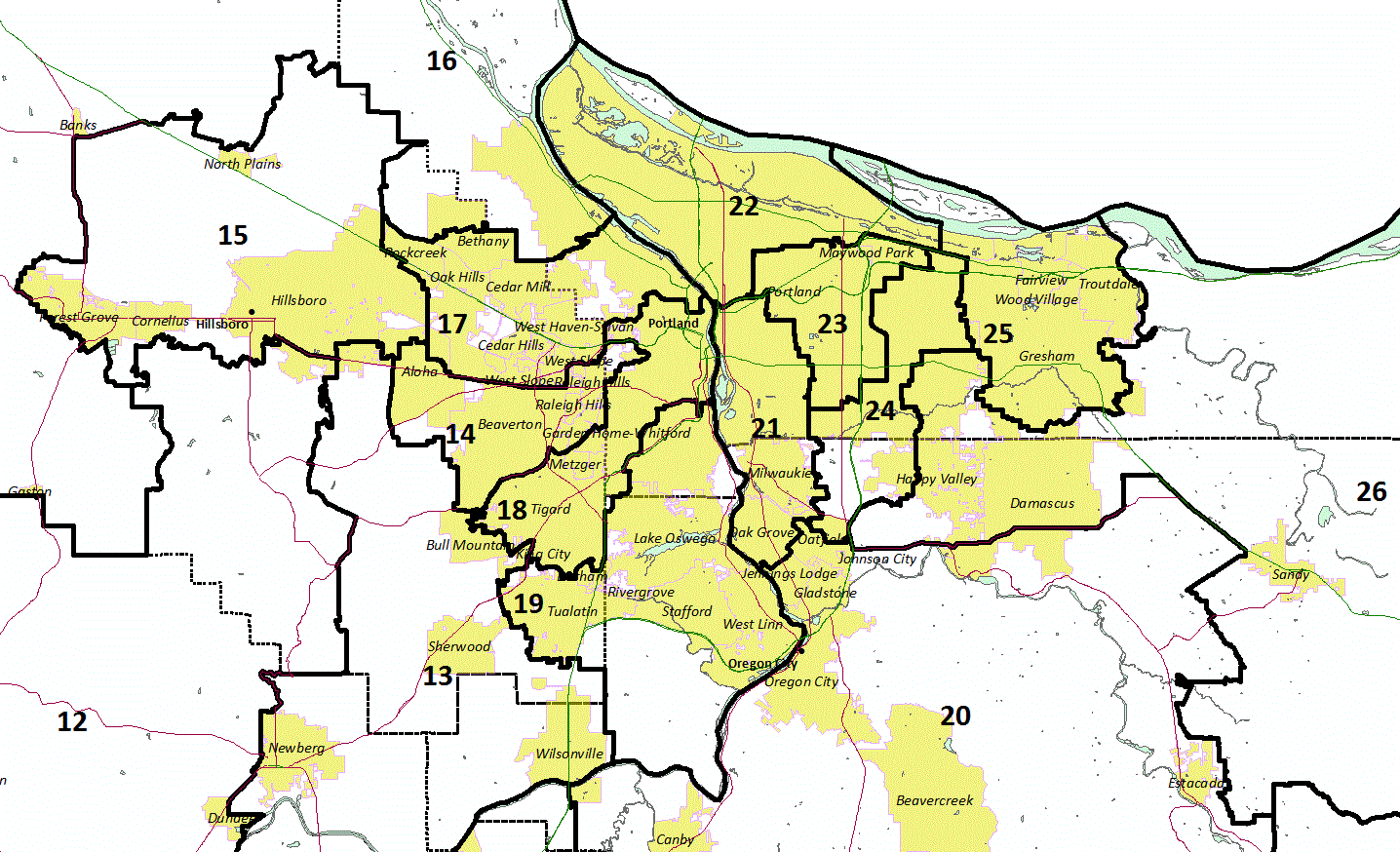
Portland Metro Area view of 2012 Senate Districts

=== Predictions ===
| Source | Ranking | As of |
|---|---|---|
| Governing | Lean D | October 24, 2012 |

=== Open seats ===
- District 2: Republican Jason Atkinson retired.
- District 5: Democrat Joanne Verger retired.
- District 27: Republican Chris Telfer was defeated in the District 27 primary by Tim Knopp, the vice president of the Central Oregon Builders Association and a former state Representative.
- District 29: Republican David Nelson retired.

=== Results ===
Oregon State Senate elections, 2012 General election — November 6, 2012
| Party | Votes | Percentage | Seats won | Seats contested |
|---|---|---|---|---|
| Democratic | 434,590 | 50.81% | 8 | 14 |
| Republican | 289,189 | 46.66% | 8 | 14 |
| American Independent | 10,459 | 1.22% | 0 | 1 |
| Libertarian | 7,203 | 0.84% | 0 | 3 |
| Others | 4,005 | 0.47% | 0 | |
| Valid votes | 855,334 | 86.18% | — | — |
| Invalid votes | 137,109 | 13.82% | — | — |
| Total ballots returned | 992,443 | 100.00% | 16 | 34 |
| Voter turnout | 83.14% (Registered Voters) | | | |

| District | Party | Incumbent | Status | Party | Candidate | Votes | % |
|---|---|---|---|---|---|---|---|
| 1 | Republican | Jeff Kruse of Roseburg | Re-elected | Republican | Jeff Kruse | 40,361 | |
| 1 | Republican | Jeff Kruse of Roseburg | Re-elected | Democratic | Eldon Rollins | 16,062 | |
| 1 | Republican | Jeff Kruse of Roseburg | Re-elected | | other | 121 | |
| 2 | Republican | Jason Atkinson of Central Point | Retired | Republican | Herman Baertschiger Jr. | 34,420 | |
| 2 | Republican | Jason Atkinson of Central Point | Retired | Democratic | Jim Diefenderfer | 18,219 | |
| 2 | Republican | Jason Atkinson of Central Point | Retired | | other | 174 | |
| 5 | Democratic | Joanne Verger of Coos Bay | Retired | Democratic | Arnie Roblan | 30,343 | |
| 5 | Democratic | Joanne Verger of Coos Bay | Retired | Republican | Scott Roberts | 24,979 | |
| 5 | Democratic | Joanne Verger of Coos Bay | Retired | | other | 92 | |
| 9 | Republican | Fred Girod of Stayton | Re-elected | Republican | Fred Girod | 33,278 | |
| 9 | Republican | Fred Girod of Stayton | Re-elected | Democratic | Steve Frank | 18,451 | |
| 9 | Republican | Fred Girod of Stayton | Re-elected | | other | 117 | |
| 12 | Republican | Brian Boquist of McMinnville | Re-elected | Republican | Brian Boquist | 34,038 | |
| 12 | Republican | Brian Boquist of McMinnville | Re-elected | Democratic | Annette Frank | 22,535 | |
| 12 | Republican | Brian Boquist of McMinnville | Re-elected | | other | 117 | |
| 14 | Democratic | Mark Hass of Beaverton | Re-elected | Democratic | Mark Hass | 32,372 | |
| 14 | Democratic | Mark Hass of Beaverton | Re-elected | Republican | Gary Coe | 19,694 | |
| 14 | Democratic | Mark Hass of Beaverton | Re-elected | | others | 1560 | |
| 17 | Democratic | Elizabeth Steiner Hayward of Portland | Re-elected | Democratic | Elizabeth Steiner Hayward | 37,545 | |
| 17 | Democratic | Elizabeth Steiner Hayward of Portland | Re-elected | Republican | John Verbeek | 18,879 | |
| 17 | Democratic | Elizabeth Steiner Hayward of Portland | Re-elected | | other | 120 | |
| 18 | Democratic | Ginny Burdick of Portland | Re-elected | Democratic | Ginny Burdick | 43,412 | |
| 18 | Democratic | Ginny Burdick of Portland | Re-elected | Republican | Suzanne Gallagher | 19,037 | |
| 18 | Democratic | Ginny Burdick of Portland | Re-elected | | other | 193 | |
| 21 | Democratic | Diane Rosenbaum of Portland | Re-elected | Democratic | Diane Rosenbaum | 55,734 | |
| 21 | Democratic | Diane Rosenbaum of Portland | Re-elected | Republican | Cliff Hutchison | 10,143 | |
| 21 | Democratic | Diane Rosenbaum of Portland | Re-elected | | other | 204 | |
| 22 | Democratic | Chip Shields of Portland | Re-elected | Democratic | Chip Shields | 55,017 | |
| 22 | Democratic | Chip Shields of Portland | Re-elected | Libertarian | Herbert Booth | 4,693 | |
| 22 | Democratic | Chip Shields of Portland | Re-elected | | other | 335 | |
| 23 | Democratic | Jackie Dingfelder of Portland | Re-elected | Democratic | Jackie Dingfelder | 43,582 | |
| 23 | Democratic | Jackie Dingfelder of Portland | Re-elected | Independent | Tracy Olsen | 10,459 | |
| 23 | Democratic | Jackie Dingfelder of Portland | Re-elected | | other | 378 | |
| 25 | Democratic | Laurie Monnes Anderson of Gresham | Re-elected | Democratic | Laurie Monnes Anderson | 22,944 | |
| 25 | Democratic | Laurie Monnes Anderson of Gresham | Re-elected | Republican | Scott Hansen | 18,962 | |
| 25 | Democratic | Laurie Monnes Anderson of Gresham | Re-elected | | other | 1927 | |
| 27 | Republican | Chris Telfer of Tumalo | Lost in primary | Republican | Tim Knopp | 35,398 | |
| 27 | Republican | Chris Telfer of Tumalo | Lost in primary | Democratic | Geri Hauser | 24,399 | |
| 27 | Republican | Chris Telfer of Tumalo | Lost in primary | | other | 270 | |
| 28 | Republican | Doug Whitsett of Klamath Falls | Re-elected | Republican | Doug Whitsett | 40,658 | |
| 28 | Republican | Doug Whitsett of Klamath Falls | Re-elected | | other | 924 | |
| 29 | Republican | David Nelson of Pendleton | Retired | Republican | Bill Hansell | 30,552 | |
| 29 | Republican | David Nelson of Pendleton | Retired | Democratic | Antone Minthorn | 13,975 | |
| 29 | Republican | David Nelson of Pendleton | Retired | | other | 108 | |
| 30 | Republican | Ted Ferrioli of John Day | Re-elected | Republican | Ted Ferrioli | 38,678 | |
| 30 | Republican | Ted Ferrioli of John Day | Re-elected | | other | 675 | |

== House of Representatives ==
2012 Oregon House of Representatives elections
- November 6, 2012

60 seats of the Oregon House of Representatives 31 seats needed for a majority
| | Majority party | Minority party |
|---|---|---|
| Party | Democratic | Republican |
| Seats before | 30 | 30 |
| Seats after | 34 | 26 |
| Seat change | ▲4 | ▼4 |
- Results: Democratic gain Democratic hold Republican hold

In the House, all 60 seats up for re-election. In the previous session, the house was evenly split between Democrats and Republicans, 30–30.

=== Predictions ===
| Source | Ranking | As of |
|---|---|---|
| Governing | Lean D (flip) | October 24, 2012 |

=== Open seats ===
- District 9: Democrat Arnie Roblan won an open state senate seat in District 5.
- District 10: Democrat Jean Cowan retired.
- District 12: Democrat Terry Beyer retired.
- District 26: Republican Matt Wingard won the Republican primary, but dropped his re-election bid following a scandal.
- District 36: Democrat Mary Nolan ran unsuccessfully for a seat on the Portland City Council.
- District 40: Democratic Dave Hunt ran unsuccessfully for chairman of the Clackamas County Board of County Commissioners.
- District 47: Democratic Jefferson Smith ran unsuccessfully for Mayor of Portland.
- District 48: Democrat Mike Schaufler lost in the Democratic primary to Jeff Reardon.
- District 56: Republican Bill Garrard retired.

=== Results ===
| District | Party | Incumbent | Status | Party | Candidate | Votes | % |
|---|---|---|---|---|---|---|---|
| 1 | Republican | Wayne Krieger of Gold Beach | Re-elected | Republican | Wayne Krieger | 21,505 | |
| 1 | Republican | Wayne Krieger of Gold Beach | Re-elected | Democratic | Jim Klahr | 9,917 | |
| 1 | Republican | Wayne Krieger of Gold Beach | Re-elected | | other | 75 | |
| 2 | Republican | Tim Freeman of Roseburg | Re-elected | Republican | Tim Freeman | 17,653 | |
| 2 | Republican | Tim Freeman of Roseburg | Re-elected | Libertarian | Jeff Adams | 5,113 | |
| 2 | Republican | Tim Freeman of Roseburg | Re-elected | | other | 187 | |
| 3 | Republican | Wally Hicks of Grants Pass | Re-elected | Republican | Wally Hicks | 18,681 | |
| 3 | Republican | Wally Hicks of Grants Pass | Re-elected | Constitution | Barbara L. Gonzalez | 3,043 | |
| 3 | Republican | Wally Hicks of Grants Pass | Re-elected | Libertarian | Johnie Wayne Scott | 2,944 | |
| 3 | Republican | Wally Hicks of Grants Pass | Re-elected | | other | 172 | |
| 4 | Republican | Dennis Richardson of Central Point | Re-elected | Republican | Dennis Richardson | 21,284 | |
| 4 | Republican | Dennis Richardson of Central Point | Re-elected | Constitution | Rick Hake | 3,047 | |
| 4 | Republican | Dennis Richardson of Central Point | Re-elected | | other | 148 | |
| 5 | Democratic | Peter Buckley of Ashland | Re-elected | Democratic | Peter Buckley | 20,635 | |
| 5 | Democratic | Peter Buckley of Ashland | Re-elected | Republican | Sandra A. Abercrombie | 10,427 | |
| 5 | Democratic | Peter Buckley of Ashland | Re-elected | | other | 49 | |
| 6 | Republican | Sal Esquivel of Medford | Re-elected | Republican | Sal Esquivel | 16,594 | |
| 6 | Republican | Sal Esquivel of Medford | Re-elected | | other | 676 | |
| 7 | Republican | Bruce Hanna of Roseburg | Re-elected | Republican | Bruce Hanna | 18,459 | |
| 7 | Republican | Bruce Hanna of Roseburg | Re-elected | Democratic | Fergus Mclean | 8,147 | |
| 7 | Republican | Bruce Hanna of Roseburg | Re-elected | | other | 75 | |
| 8 | Democratic | Paul Holvey of Eugene | Re-elected | Democratic | Paul Holvey | 21,681 | |
| 8 | Democratic | Paul Holvey of Eugene | Re-elected | Republican | Aaron Baker | 8,014 | |
| 8 | Democratic | Paul Holvey of Eugene | Re-elected | | others | 1000 | |
| 9 | Democratic | Arnie Roblan of Coos Bay | Retired | Democratic | Caddy McKeown | 14,906 | |
| 9 | Democratic | Arnie Roblan of Coos Bay | Retired | Republican | Nancy Brouhard | 11,639 | |
| 9 | Democratic | Arnie Roblan of Coos Bay | Retired | | others | 759 | |
| 10 | Democratic | Jean Cowan of Newport | Retired | Democratic | David Gomberg | 15,978 | |
| 10 | Democratic | Jean Cowan of Newport | Retired | Republican | Jerome Grant | 11,028 | |
| 10 | Democratic | Jean Cowan of Newport | Retired | | other | 46 | |
| 11 | Democratic | Phil Barnhart of Eugene | Re-elected | Democratic | Phil Barnhart | 15,842 | |
| 11 | Democratic | Phil Barnhart of Eugene | Re-elected | Republican | Kelly Lovelace | 12,477 | |
| 11 | Democratic | Phil Barnhart of Eugene | Re-elected | | other | 82 | |
| 12 | Democratic | Terry Beyer of Springfield | Retired | Democratic | John Lively | 12,213 | |
| 12 | Democratic | Terry Beyer of Springfield | Retired | Republican | Joe Pishioneri | 10,442 | |
| 12 | Democratic | Terry Beyer of Springfield | Retired | | other | 73 | |
| 13 | Democratic | Nancy Nathanson of Eugene | Re-elected | Democratic | Nancy Nathanson | 19,110 | |
| 13 | Democratic | Nancy Nathanson of Eugene | Re-elected | Republican | Mark Callahan | 8,651 | |
| 13 | Democratic | Nancy Nathanson of Eugene | Re-elected | | other | 56 | |
| 14 | Democratic | Val Hoyle of Eugene | Re-elected | Democratic | Val Hoyle | 14,413 | |
| 14 | Democratic | Val Hoyle of Eugene | Re-elected | Republican | Dwight Coon | 11,309 | |
| 14 | Democratic | Val Hoyle of Eugene | Re-elected | Libertarian | Sharon A. Mahler | 790 | |
| 14 | Democratic | Val Hoyle of Eugene | Re-elected | | other | 38 | |
| 15 | Republican | Andy Olson of Albany | Re-elected | Republican | Andy Olson | 17,977 | |
| 15 | Republican | Andy Olson of Albany | Re-elected | Democratic | John-Paul Cernak | 9,046 | |
| 15 | Republican | Andy Olson of Albany | Re-elected | | other | 57 | |
| 16 | Democratic | Sara Gelser of Corvallis | Re-elected | Democratic | Sara Gelser | 19,306 | |
| 16 | Democratic | Sara Gelser of Corvallis | Re-elected | Republican | Andrew Decker | 7,336 | |
| 16 | Democratic | Sara Gelser of Corvallis | Re-elected | | others | 955 | |
| 17 | Republican | Sherrie Sprenger of Scio | Re-elected | Republican | Sherrie Sprenger | 18,118 | |
| 17 | Republican | Sherrie Sprenger of Scio | Re-elected | Democratic | Richard Harisay | 7,872 | |
| 17 | Republican | Sherrie Sprenger of Scio | Re-elected | | other | 73 | |
| 18 | Republican | Vic Gilliam of Silverton | Re-elected | Republican | Vic Gilliam | 20,824 | |
| 18 | Republican | Vic Gilliam of Silverton | Re-elected | | other | 779 | |
| 19 | Republican | Kevin Cameron of Salem | Re-elected | Republican | Kevin Cameron | 15,388 | |
| 19 | Republican | Kevin Cameron of Salem | Re-elected | Democratic | Claudia Kyle | 10,892 | |
| 19 | Republican | Kevin Cameron of Salem | Re-elected | | other | 63 | |
| 20 | Republican | Vicki Berger of Salem | Re-elected | Republican | Vicki Berger | 16,745 | |
| 20 | Republican | Vicki Berger of Salem | Re-elected | Democratic | Kathy T. Graham | 9,916 | |
| 20 | Republican | Vicki Berger of Salem | Re-elected | | other | 103 | |
| 21 | Democratic | Brian Clem of Salem | Re-elected | Democratic | Brian Clem | 11,542 | |
| 21 | Democratic | Brian Clem of Salem | Re-elected | Republican | Dan Farrington | 7,227 | |
| 21 | Democratic | Brian Clem of Salem | Re-elected | Independent | Marvin Sannes | 758 | |
| 21 | Democratic | Brian Clem of Salem | Re-elected | | other | 51 | |
| 22 | Democratic | Betty Komp of Woodburn | Re-elected | Democratic | Betty Komp | 7,524 | |
| 22 | Democratic | Betty Komp of Woodburn | Re-elected | Republican | Kathy LeCompte | 6,478 | |
| 22 | Democratic | Betty Komp of Woodburn | Re-elected | | other | 62 | |
| 23 | Republican | Jim Thompson of Dallas | Re-elected | Republican | Jim Thompson | 17,864 | |
| 23 | Republican | Jim Thompson of Dallas | Re-elected | Democratic | Ross Swartzendruber | 9,937 | |
| 23 | Republican | Jim Thompson of Dallas | Re-elected | Green | Alex Polikoff | 2,381 | |
| 23 | Republican | Jim Thompson of Dallas | Re-elected | | other | 43 | |
| 24 | Republican | Jim Weidner of Yamhill | Re-elected | Republican | Jim Weidner | 14,707 | |
| 24 | Republican | Jim Weidner of Yamhill | Re-elected | Democratic | Kathy Campbell | 11,755 | |
| 24 | Republican | Jim Weidner of Yamhill | Re-elected | | other | 631 | |
| 25 | Republican | Kim Thatcher of Keizer | Re-elected | Republican | Kim Thatcher | 16,670 | |
| 25 | Republican | Kim Thatcher of Keizer | Re-elected | Democratic | Paul Holman | 8,858 | |
| 25 | Republican | Kim Thatcher of Keizer | Re-elected | | others | 745 | |
| 26 | Republican | Matt Wingard of Wilsonville | Retired | Republican | John Davis | 15,141 | |
| 26 | Republican | Matt Wingard of Wilsonville | Retired | Democratic | Wynne Wakkila | 12,096 | |
| 26 | Republican | Matt Wingard of Wilsonville | Retired | | other | 60 | |
| 27 | Democratic | Tobias Read of Beaverton | Re-elected | Democratic | Tobias Read | 19,180 | |
| 27 | Democratic | Tobias Read of Beaverton | Re-elected | Republican | Burton Keeble | 9,005 | |
| 27 | Democratic | Tobias Read of Beaverton | Re-elected | | other | 81 | |
| 28 | Democratic | Jeff Barker of Aloha | Re-elected | Democratic | Jeff Barker | 14,841 | |
| 28 | Democratic | Jeff Barker of Aloha | Re-elected | Republican | Manuel Castaneda | 9,605 | |
| 28 | Democratic | Jeff Barker of Aloha | Re-elected | | other | 55 | |
| 29 | Republican | Katie Eyre of Hillsboro | Lost re-election | Republican | Katie Eyre | 9,788 | |
| 29 | Republican | Katie Eyre of Hillsboro | Lost re-election | Democratic | Ben Unger | 11,312 | |
| 29 | Republican | Katie Eyre of Hillsboro | Lost re-election | | other | 60 | |
| 30 | Republican | Shawn Lindsay of Hillsboro | Lost re-election | Republican | Shawn Lindsay | 11,096 | |
| 30 | Republican | Shawn Lindsay of Hillsboro | Lost re-election | Democratic | Joe Gallegos | 12,299 | |
| 30 | Republican | Shawn Lindsay of Hillsboro | Lost re-election | Libertarian | Kyle Markley | 1,441 | |
| 30 | Republican | Shawn Lindsay of Hillsboro | Lost re-election | | other | 43 | |
| 31 | Democratic | Brad Witt of Clatskanie | Re-elected | Democratic | Brad Witt | 15,650 | |
| 31 | Democratic | Brad Witt of Clatskanie | Re-elected | Republican | Lew Barnes | 12,262 | |
| 31 | Democratic | Brad Witt of Clatskanie | Re-elected | Constitution | Ray Biggs | 782 | |
| 31 | Democratic | Brad Witt of Clatskanie | Re-elected | Libertarian | Robert Miller | 665 | |
| 31 | Democratic | Brad Witt of Clatskanie | Re-elected | | other | 44 | |
| 32 | Democratic | Deborah Boone of Cannon Beach | Re-elected | Democratic | Deborah Boone | 18,405 | |
| 32 | Democratic | Deborah Boone of Cannon Beach | Re-elected | Constitution | Jim Welsh | 6,938 | |
| 32 | Democratic | Deborah Boone of Cannon Beach | Re-elected | Libertarian | Perry Roll | 1,468 | |
| 32 | Democratic | Deborah Boone of Cannon Beach | Re-elected | | other | 118 | |
| 33 | Democratic | Mitch Greenlick of Portland | Re-elected | Democratic | Mitch Greenlick | 21,248 | |
| 33 | Democratic | Mitch Greenlick of Portland | Re-elected | Republican | Stevan Kirkpatrick | 9,455 | |
| 33 | Democratic | Mitch Greenlick of Portland | Re-elected | | other | 78 | |
| 34 | Democratic | Chris Harker of Beaverton | Re-elected | Democratic | Chris Harker | 16,035 | |
| 34 | Democratic | Chris Harker of Beaverton | Re-elected | Republican | Dan Mason | 9,023 | |
| 34 | Democratic | Chris Harker of Beaverton | Re-elected | | other | 75 | |
| 35 | Democratic | Margaret Doherty of Tigard | Re-elected | Democratic | Margaret Doherty | 17,593 | |
| 35 | Democratic | Margaret Doherty of Tigard | Re-elected | Republican | John Goodhouse | 11,753 | |
| 35 | Democratic | Margaret Doherty of Tigard | Re-elected | | other | 52 | |
| 36 | Democratic | Mary Nolan of Portland | Retired | Democratic | Jennifer Williamson | 26,785 | |
| 36 | Democratic | Mary Nolan of Portland | Retired | Republican | Bruce Neal | 5,664 | |
| 36 | Democratic | Mary Nolan of Portland | Retired | | other | 129 | |
| 37 | Republican | Julie Parrish of West Linn | Re-elected | Republican | Julie Parrish | 16,122 | |
| 37 | Republican | Julie Parrish of West Linn | Re-elected | Democratic | Carl Hosticka | 14,925 | |
| 37 | Republican | Julie Parrish of West Linn | Re-elected | Libertarian | Meredith Love Taggart | 695 | |
| 37 | Republican | Julie Parrish of West Linn | Re-elected | | other | 28 | |
| 38 | Democratic | Chris Garrett of Lake Oswego | Re-elected | Democratic | Chris Garrett | 24,017 | |
| 38 | Democratic | Chris Garrett of Lake Oswego | Re-elected | Republican | Tom Maginnis | 10,984 | |
| 38 | Democratic | Chris Garrett of Lake Oswego | Re-elected | | other | 84 | |
| 39 | Republican | Bill Kennemer of Oregon City | Re-elected | Republican | Bill Kennemer | 18,748 | |
| 39 | Republican | Bill Kennemer of Oregon City | Re-elected | Democratic | Christopher Cameron Bangs | 11,045 | |
| 39 | Republican | Bill Kennemer of Oregon City | Re-elected | Libertarian | Blake Holmes | 763 | |
| 39 | Republican | Bill Kennemer of Oregon City | Re-elected | | other | 33 | |
| 40 | Democratic | Dave Hunt of Gladstone | Retired | Democratic | Brent Barton | 14083 | |
| 40 | Democratic | Dave Hunt of Gladstone | Retired | Republican | Steve Newgard | 13735 | |
| 40 | Democratic | Dave Hunt of Gladstone | Retired | | other | 66 | |
| 41 | Democratic | Carolyn Tomei of Milwaukie | Re-elected | Democratic | Carolyn Tomei | 22530 | |
| 41 | Democratic | Carolyn Tomei of Milwaukie | Re-elected | Republican | Timothy E. McMenamin | 8559 | |
| 41 | Democratic | Carolyn Tomei of Milwaukie | Re-elected | | other | 67 | |
| 42 | Democratic | Jules Bailey of Portland | Re-elected | Democratic | Jules Bailey | 27055 | |
| 42 | Democratic | Jules Bailey of Portland | Re-elected | | other | 632 | |
| 43 | Democratic | Lew Frederick of Portland | Re-elected | Democratic | Lew Frederick | 27623 | |
| 43 | Democratic | Lew Frederick of Portland | Re-elected | | other | 569 | |
| 44 | Democratic | Tina Kotek of Portland | Re-elected | Democratic | Tina Kotek | 23235 | |
| 44 | Democratic | Tina Kotek of Portland | Re-elected | Republican | Michael Harrington | 3557 | |
| 44 | Democratic | Tina Kotek of Portland | Re-elected | | other | 126 | |
| 45 | Democratic | Michael Dembrow of Portland | Re-elected | Democratic | Michael Dembrow | 24403 | |
| 45 | Democratic | Michael Dembrow of Portland | Re-elected | Republican | Anne Marie Gurney | 5177 | |
| 45 | Democratic | Michael Dembrow of Portland | Re-elected | | other | 114 | |
| 46 | Democratic | Alissa Keny-Guyer of Portland | Re-elected | Democratic | Alissa Keny-Guyer | 19945 | |
| 46 | Democratic | Alissa Keny-Guyer of Portland | Re-elected | | other | 566 | |
| 47 | Democratic | Jefferson Smith of Portland | Retired | Democratic | Jessica Vega Pederson | 12662 | |
| 47 | Democratic | Jefferson Smith of Portland | Retired | Republican | Maggie Nelson | 6773 | |
| 47 | Democratic | Jefferson Smith of Portland | Retired | | other | 93 | |
| 48 | Democratic | Mike Schaufler of Happy Valley | Lost in primary | Democratic | Jeff Reardon | 13967 | |
| 48 | Democratic | Mike Schaufler of Happy Valley | Lost in primary | Republican | George (Sonny) Yellott | 6255 | |
| 48 | Democratic | Mike Schaufler of Happy Valley | Lost in primary | | other | 94 | |
| 49 | Republican | Matt Wand of Troutdale | Lost re-election | Republican | Matt Wand | 9602 | |
| 49 | Republican | Matt Wand of Troutdale | Lost re-election | Democratic | Chris Gorsek | 11459 | |
| 49 | Republican | Matt Wand of Troutdale | Lost re-election | | other | 75 | |
| 50 | Democratic | Greg Matthews of Gresham | Re-elected | Democratic | Greg Matthews | 13856 | |
| 50 | Democratic | Greg Matthews of Gresham | Re-elected | Republican | Logan Boettcher | 7037 | |
| 50 | Democratic | Greg Matthews of Gresham | Re-elected | | other | 101 | |
| 51 | Democratic | Patrick Sheehan of Clackamas | Lost re-election | Republican | Patrick Sheehan | 11199 | |
| 51 | Democratic | Patrick Sheehan of Clackamas | Lost re-election | Democratic | Shemia Fagan | 12584 | |
| 51 | Democratic | Patrick Sheehan of Clackamas | Lost re-election | | other | 66 | |
| 52 | Republican | Mark Johnson of Hood River | Re-elected | Republican | Mark Johnson | 14344 | |
| 52 | Republican | Mark Johnson of Hood River | Re-elected | Democratic | Peter Nordbye | 13407 | |
| 52 | Republican | Mark Johnson of Hood River | Re-elected | | other | 50 | |
| 53 | Republican | Gene Whisnant of Sunriver | Re-elected | Republican | Gene Whisnant | 21675 | |
| 53 | Republican | Gene Whisnant of Sunriver | Re-elected | | other | 460 | |
| 54 | Republican | Jason Conger of Bend | Re-elected | Republican | Jason Conger | 16716 | |
| 54 | Republican | Jason Conger of Bend | Re-elected | Democratic | Nathan R. Hovekamp | 12877 | |
| 54 | Republican | Jason Conger of Bend | Re-elected | | other | 67 | |
| 55 | Republican | Mike McLane of Powell Butte | Re-elected | Republican | Mike McLane | 18836 | |
| 55 | Republican | Mike McLane of Powell Butte | Re-elected | Democratic | John Huddle | 8842 | |
| 55 | Republican | Mike McLane of Powell Butte | Re-elected | | other | 55 | |
| 56 | Republican | Bill Garrard of Klamath Falls | Retired | Republican | Gail Whitsett | 18987 | |
| 56 | Republican | Bill Garrard of Klamath Falls | Retired | | other | 630 | |
| 57 | Republican | Greg Smith of Heppner | Re-elected | Republican | Greg Smith | 15242 | |
| 57 | Republican | Greg Smith of Heppner | Re-elected | | other | 252 | |
| 58 | Republican | Bob Jenson of Pendleton | Re-elected | Republican | Bob Jenson | 19497 | |
| 58 | Republican | Bob Jenson of Pendleton | Re-elected | Democratic | Heidi Van Schoonhoven | 6066 | |
| 58 | Republican | Bob Jenson of Pendleton | Re-elected | | other | 119 | |
| 59 | Republican | John Huffman of The Dalles | Re-elected | Republican | John Huffman | 17466 | |
| 59 | Republican | John Huffman of The Dalles | Re-elected | Democratic | Gary L. Ollerenshaw | 8678 | |
| 59 | Republican | John Huffman of The Dalles | Re-elected | | other | 53 | |
| 60 | Republican | Cliff Bentz of Ontario | Re-elected | Republican | Cliff Bentz | 20310 | |
| 60 | Republican | Cliff Bentz of Ontario | Re-elected | | other | 265 | |

== See also ==
- 76th Oregon Legislative Assembly (2011–2012)
- 77th Oregon Legislative Assembly (2013–2014)

== Sources ==
Oregon Secretary of State - November 6, 2012, General Election Abstract of Votes
