= 2016 Oregon legislative election =

Oregon legislative elections, 2016
- November 8, 2016

16 seats of the Oregon State Senate and 60 seats of the Oregon House of Representatives
| | Majority party | Minority party |
|---|---|---|
| Party | Democratic | Republican |
| Seats before | 53 (18 in Senate, 35 in House) | 37 (12 Senate, 25 House) |
| Seats after | 52 (17 in Senate, 35 in House) | 38 (13 Senate, 25 House) |
| Seat change | ▼1 ▼1 in Senate, in House | ▲1 ▲1 in Senate, in House |

The 2016 elections for the Oregon Legislative Assembly determined the composition of both houses for the 79th Oregon Legislative Assembly. The Republican and Democratic parties held primary elections on May 17, 2016 with general elections on November 8.

The Democratic Party maintained its 35-25 advantage in the Oregon House of Representatives while losing one seat in the Oregon State Senate to bring their advantage to 17-13 over the Republicans.

== Oregon Senate ==
2016 Oregon State Senate elections
- November 8, 2016

16 of 30 seats in the Oregon State Senate 16 seats needed for a majority
| | Majority party | Minority party |
|---|---|---|
| Party | Democratic | Republican |
| Seats before | 18 | 12 |
| Seats after | 17 | 13 |
| Seat change | ▼1 | ▲1 |
| Popular vote | 472,564 | 410,566 |
| Percentage | 50.95% | 44.27% |
| Swing | ▼7.55% | ▲8.65% |
- Results of the elections: Republican gain Democratic hold Republican hold No election

In the previous session, the Democrats held an 18-12 majority over the Republicans. The 16 seats up for election included 8 seats previously held by Republicans, and 8 by Democrats.

=== Predictions ===
| Source | Ranking | As of |
|---|---|---|
| Governing | Safe D | October 12, 2016 |

=== Open seats ===
- In District 3, incumbent Democrat Kevin Talbert, who was appointed in August to replace the deceased Alan Bates decided not to seek election.
- In District 21, incumbent Democrat and President Pro Tempore Diane Rosenbaum retired.
- In District 22, incumbent Democrat Chip Shields retired.
- In District 28, incumbent Republican Doug Whitsett retired.

=== Results ===
| Affiliation | Candidates | Votes | Vote % | Seats Won | Seats After |
|---|---|---|---|---|---|
| Democratic | 14 | 472,564 | 50.95% | 7 (▼1) | 17 |
| Republican | 11 | 410,566 | 44.27% | 9 (▲1) | 13 |
| Libertarian | 2 | 11,173 | 1.20% | 0 | |
| Progressive | 1 | 10,390 | 1.12% | 0 | |
| Independent | 1 | 9,114 | 0.98% | 0 | |
| Others | N/A | 13,659 | 1.47% | 0 | |
| Total | 45 | 927,466 | 100% | 16 | 30 |

| District | Party | Incumbent | Status | Party | Candidate | Votes | % |
|---|---|---|---|---|---|---|---|
| 1 | Republican | Jeff Kruse of Roseburg | Re-elected | Republican | Jeff Kruse | 45,424 | 73.39% |
| 1 | Republican | Jeff Kruse of Roseburg | Re-elected | Democratic | Timm Rolek | 16,365 | 26.44% |
| 1 | Republican | Jeff Kruse of Roseburg | Re-elected | | others | 104 | 0.17% |
| 2 | Republican | Herman Baertschiger Jr. of Grants Pass | Re-elected | Republican | Herman Baertschiger Jr. | 43,519 | 97.61% |
| 2 | Republican | Herman Baertschiger Jr. of Grants Pass | Re-elected | | others | 1,064 | 2.39% |
| 3 | Democratic | Kevin Talbert of Ashland | Did not seek election, Republican gain | Republican | Alan DeBoer | 32,925 | 50.20% |
| 3 | Democratic | Kevin Talbert of Ashland | Did not seek election, Republican gain | Democratic | Tonia Moro | 32,516 | 49.57% |
| 3 | Democratic | Kevin Talbert of Ashland | Did not seek election, Republican gain | | others | 152 | 0.23% |
| 5 | Democratic | Arnie Roblan of Coos Bay | Re-elected | Democratic | Arnie Roblan | 30,301 | 48.18% |
| 5 | Democratic | Arnie Roblan of Coos Bay | Re-elected | Republican | Dick Anderson | 29,944 | 47.61% |
| 5 | Democratic | Arnie Roblan of Coos Bay | Re-elected | | others | 2,663 | 4.23% |
| 9 | Republican | Fred Girod of Stayton | Re-elected | Republican | Fred Girod | 40,655 | 68.70% |
| 9 | Republican | Fred Girod of Stayton | Re-elected | Democratic | Rich Harisay | 15,901 | 26.87% |
| 9 | Republican | Fred Girod of Stayton | Re-elected | | others | 2,623 | 4.43% |
| 12 | Republican | Brian Boquist of Dallas | Re-elected | Republican | Brian Boquist | 39,900 | 62.86% |
| 12 | Republican | Brian Boquist of Dallas | Re-elected | Democratic | Ross Schwartzendruber | 23,437 | 36.92% |
| 12 | Republican | Brian Boquist of Dallas | Re-elected | | others | 137 | 0.22% |
| 14 | Democratic | Mark Hass of Beaverton | Re-elected | Democratic | Mark Hass | 44,338 | 97.21% |
| 14 | Democratic | Mark Hass of Beaverton | Re-elected | | others | 1,271 | 2.79% |
| 18 | Democratic | Ginny Burdick of Portland | Re-elected | Democratic | Ginny Burdick | 51,491 | 97.44% |
| 18 | Democratic | Ginny Burdick of Portland | Re-elected | | others | 1,353 | 2.56% |
| 21 | Democratic | Diane Rosenbaum of Portland | Retired, Democratic hold | Democratic | Kathleen Taylor | 54,520 | 76.70% |
| 21 | Democratic | Diane Rosenbaum of Portland | Retired, Democratic hold | Progressive | James Ofsink | 10,390 | 14.62% |
| 21 | Democratic | Diane Rosenbaum of Portland | Retired, Democratic hold | Libertarian | Josh Howard | 5,852 | 8.23% |
| 21 | Democratic | Diane Rosenbaum of Portland | Retired, Democratic hold | | others | 322 | 0.45% |
| 22 | Democratic | Chip Shields of Portland | Retired, Democratic hold | Democratic | Lew Frederick | 60,803 | 91.55% |
| 22 | Democratic | Chip Shields of Portland | Retired, Democratic hold | Libertarian | Eugene Newell | 5,321 | 8.01% |
| 22 | Democratic | Chip Shields of Portland | Retired, Democratic hold | | others | 202 | 0.44% |
| 23 | Democratic | Michael Dembrow of Portland | Re-elected | Democratic | Michael Dembrow | 48,722 | 97.85% |
| 23 | Democratic | Michael Dembrow of Portland | Re-elected | | others | 1,071 | 2.15% |
| 25 | Democratic | Laurie Monnes Anderson of Gresham | Re-elected | Democratic | Laurie Monnes Anderson | 25,339 | 55.07% |
| 25 | Democratic | Laurie Monnes Anderson of Gresham | Re-elected | Republican | Tamie Tlustos-Arnold | 18,742 | 40.73% |
| 25 | Democratic | Laurie Monnes Anderson of Gresham | Re-elected | | others | 1,930 | 4.19% |
| 27 | Republican | Tim Knopp of Bend | Re-elected | Republican | Tim Knopp | 44,691 | 60.58% |
| 27 | Republican | Tim Knopp of Bend | Re-elected | Democratic | Greg Delgado | 28,933 | 39.22% |
| 27 | Republican | Tim Knopp of Bend | Re-elected | | others | 147 | 0.20% |
| 28 | Republican | Doug Whitsett of Klamath Falls | Retired, Republican hold | Republican | Dennis Linthicum | 36,770 | 61.32% |
| 28 | Republican | Doug Whitsett of Klamath Falls | Retired, Republican hold | Democratic | Todd Kepple | 22,906 | 38.20% |
| 28 | Republican | Doug Whitsett of Klamath Falls | Retired, Republican hold | | others | 284 | 0.37% |
| 29 | Republican | Bill Hansell of Athena | Re-elected | Republican | Bill Hansell | 37,785 | 80.27% |
| 29 | Republican | Bill Hansell of Athena | Re-elected | Independent Party | Barbara Dickerson | 9,114 | 19.36% |
| 29 | Republican | Bill Hansell of Athena | Re-elected | | others | 176 | 0.28% |
| 30 | Republican | Ted Ferrioli of John Day | Re-elected | Republican | Ted Ferrioli | 40,211 | 70.10% |
| 30 | Republican | Ted Ferrioli of John Day | Re-elected | Democratic | W. Mark Stringer | 16,992 | 29.62% |
| 30 | Republican | Ted Ferrioli of John Day | Re-elected | | others | 160 | 0.74% |

== Oregon House of Representatives ==
2016 Oregon House of Representatives elections
- November 8, 2016

60 seats of the Oregon House of Representatives 31 seats needed for a majority
| | Majority party | Minority party |
|---|---|---|
| Party | Democratic | Republican |
| Seats before | 35 | 25 |
| Seats after | 35 | 25 |
| Seat change | Steady | Steady |
| Popular vote | 882,897 | 756,619 |
| Percentage | 50.23% | 43.05% |
| Swing | ▼0.67% | ▼1.15% |
- Results; Democratic hold Republican hold

All 60 seats of the Oregon House of Representatives were up for re-election, being represented by 35 Democrats and 25 Republicans. The Democrats expanded their 34-26 advantage to 35-25 in the 2014 election.

=== Predictions ===
| Source | Ranking | As of |
|---|---|---|
| Governing | Likely D | October 12, 2016 |

=== Open seats ===
- In District 1, incumbent Republican Wayne Krieger retired.
- In District 5, incumbent Democrat Peter Buckley retired.
- In District 14, incumbent Democrat Val Hoyle contested the Democratic primary for Secretary of State.
- In District 22, incumbent Democrat Betty Komp retired.
- In District 24, incumbent Republican Jim Weidner retired.
- In District 26, incumbent Republican John Davis retired.
- In District 27, incumbent Democrat Tobias Read retired to run for Oregon State Treasurer.
- In District 30, incumbent Democrat Joe Gallegos retired.
- In District 40, incumbent Democrat Brent Barton retired.
- In District 41, incumbent Democrat Kathleen Taylor retired to contest the District 21 Senate seat held by Diane Rosenbaum.
- In District 43, incumbent Democrat Lew Frederick retired to contest the District 22 Senate seat held by Chip Shields.
- In District 47, incumbent Democrat Jessica Vega Pederson retired to run for Multnomah County Commissioner.
- In District 51, incumbent Democrat Shemia Fagan retired.
- In District 56, incumbent Republican Gail Whitsett retired.

=== Results ===
| Affiliation | Candidates | Votes | Vote % | Seats Won |
|---|---|---|---|---|
| Democratic | 52 | 882,897 | 50.23% | 35 |
| Republican | 48 | 756,619 | 43.05% | 25 |
| Independent | 9 | 58,563 | 3.33% | 0 |
| Libertarian | 4 | 15,219 | 0.87% | 0 |
| Progressive | 2 | 9,985 | 0.57% | 0 |
| Others | N/A | 26,714 | 1.52% | 0 |
| Total | 178 | 1,757,603 | 100% | 60 |

| District | Party | Incumbent | Status | Party | Candidate | Votes | % |
|---|---|---|---|---|---|---|---|
| 1 | Republican | Wayne Krieger of Gold Beach | Retired, Republican hold | Republican | David Brock Smith | 20,212 | 59.79% |
| 1 | Republican | Wayne Krieger of Gold Beach | Retired, Republican hold | Democratic | Terry Brayer | 10,099 | 29.87% |
| 1 | Republican | Wayne Krieger of Gold Beach | Retired, Republican hold | Libertarian | Tamie Kaufman | 3,496 | 10.33% |
| 1 | Republican | Wayne Krieger of Gold Beach | Retired, Republican hold | | others | 45 | 0.13% |
| 2 | Republican | Dallas Heard of Roseburg | Re-elected | Republican | Dallas Heard | 19,759 | 97.49% |
| 2 | Republican | Dallas Heard of Roseburg | Re-elected | | others | 509 | 2.51% |
| 3 | Republican | Carl Wilson of Grants Pass | Re-elected | Republican | Carl Wilson | 21,957 | 72.39% |
| 3 | Republican | Carl Wilson of Grants Pass | Re-elected | Democratic | Tom Johnson | 8,423 | 27.29% |
| 3 | Republican | Carl Wilson of Grants Pass | Re-elected | | others | 99 | 0.32% |
| 4 | Republican | Duane Stark of Grants Pass | Re-elected | Republican | Duane Stark | 21,957 | 98.33% |
| 4 | Republican | Duane Stark of Grants Pass | Re-elected | | others | 374 | 1.67% |
| 5 | Democratic | Peter Buckley of Ashland | Retired, Democratic hold | Democratic | Pam Marsh | 22,440 | 62.71% |
| 5 | Democratic | Peter Buckley of Ashland | Retired, Democratic hold | Republican | Steven Richie | 13,254 | 37.04% |
| 5 | Democratic | Peter Buckley of Ashland | Retired, Democratic hold | | others | 89 | 0.25% |
| 6 | Republican | Sal Esquivel of Medford | Re-elected | Republican | Sal Esquivel | 15,931 | 56.48% |
| 6 | Republican | Sal Esquivel of Medford | Re-elected | Democratic | Mike Moran | 12,196 | 43.24% |
| 6 | Republican | Sal Esquivel of Medford | Re-elected | | others | 78 | 0.28% |
| 7 | Republican | Cedric Ross Hayden of Fall Creek | Re-elected | Republican | Cedric Ross Hayden | 19,409 | 65.45% |
| 7 | Republican | Cedric Ross Hayden of Fall Creek | Re-elected | Democratic | Vincent Portulano | 7,053 | 23.78% |
| 7 | Republican | Cedric Ross Hayden of Fall Creek | Re-elected | Independent Party | Fergus McLean | 3,116 | 10.51% |
| 7 | Republican | Cedric Ross Hayden of Fall Creek | Re-elected | | others | 76 | 0.26% |
| 8 | Democratic | Paul Holvey of Eugene | Re-elected | Democratic | Paul Holvey | 23,886 | 69.20% |
| 8 | Democratic | Paul Holvey of Eugene | Re-elected | Republican | Mary Tucker | 9,150 | 26.51% |
| 8 | Democratic | Paul Holvey of Eugene | Re-elected | | others | 1,479 | 4.29% |
| 9 | Democratic | Caddy McKeown of Coos Bay | Re-elected | Democratic | Caddy McKeown | 15,346 | 49.81% |
| 9 | Democratic | Caddy McKeown of Coos Bay | Re-elected | Republican | Teri Grier | 14,240 | 46.22% |
| 9 | Democratic | Caddy McKeown of Coos Bay | Re-elected | | others | 1,225 | 3.98% |
| 10 | Democratic | David Gomberg of Newport | Re-elected | Democratic | David Gomberg | 17,499 | 56.24% |
| 10 | Democratic | David Gomberg of Newport | Re-elected | Republican | Thomas Donohue | 13,524 | 43.47% |
| 10 | Democratic | David Gomberg of Newport | Re-elected | | others | 91 | 0.29% |
| 11 | Democratic | Phil Barnhart of Eugene | Re-elected | Democratic | Phil Barnhart | 17,298 | 53.12% |
| 11 | Democratic | Phil Barnhart of Eugene | Re-elected | Republican | Joe Potwora | 15,194 | 46.66% |
| 11 | Democratic | Phil Barnhart of Eugene | Re-elected | | others | 73 | 0.22% |
| 12 | Democratic | John Lively of Springfield | Re-elected | Democratic | John Lively | 16,030 | 62.30% |
| 12 | Democratic | John Lively of Springfield | Re-elected | Republican | Robert Schwartz | 9,606 | 37.33% |
| 12 | Democratic | John Lively of Springfield | Re-elected | | others | 94 | 0.37% |
| 13 | Democratic | Nancy Nathanson of Eugene | Re-elected | Democratic | Nancy Nathanson | 21,304 | 66.29% |
| 13 | Democratic | Nancy Nathanson of Eugene | Re-elected | Republican | Laura Cooper | 9,746 | 30.33% |
| 13 | Democratic | Nancy Nathanson of Eugene | Re-elected | | others | 1,088 | 3.39% |
| 14 | Democratic | Val Hoyle of Eugene | Retired, Democratic hold | Democratic | Julie Fahey | 16,039 | 51.76% |
| 14 | Democratic | Val Hoyle of Eugene | Retired, Democratic hold | Republican | Kathy Lamberg | 14,886 | 48.03% |
| 14 | Democratic | Val Hoyle of Eugene | Retired, Democratic hold | | others | 65 | 0.21% |
| 15 | Republican | Andy Olson of Albany | Re-elected | Republican | Andy Olson | 25,175 | 82.84% |
| 15 | Republican | Andy Olson of Albany | Re-elected | Progressive | Cynthia Hyatt | 5,051 | 16.62% |
| 15 | Republican | Andy Olson of Albany | Re-elected | | others | 163 | 0.54% |
| 16 | Democratic | Dan Rayfield of Corvallis | Re-elected | Democratic | Dan Rayfield | 17,921 | 58.05% |
| 16 | Democratic | Dan Rayfield of Corvallis | Re-elected | Republican | Judson McClure | 6,474 | 20.97% |
| 16 | Democratic | Dan Rayfield of Corvallis | Re-elected | Progressive | Sami Al-AbadRabbuh | 4,934 | 15.98% |
| 16 | Democratic | Dan Rayfield of Corvallis | Re-elected | | others | 1,542 | 4.99% |
| 17 | Republican | Sherrie Sprenger of Scio | Re-elected | Republican | Sherrie Sprenger | 22,673 | 78.27% |
| 17 | Republican | Sherrie Sprenger of Scio | Re-elected | Independent Party | Jeffrey Goodwin | 6,113 | 21.10% |
| 17 | Republican | Sherrie Sprenger of Scio | Re-elected | | others | 182 | 0.63% |
| 18 | Republican | Vic Gilliam of Silverton | Re-elected | Republican | Vic Gilliam | 19,250 | 64.74% |
| 18 | Republican | Vic Gilliam of Silverton | Re-elected | Democratic | Tom Kane | 9,565 | 32.17% |
| 18 | Republican | Vic Gilliam of Silverton | Re-elected | | others | 918 | 3.09% |
| 19 | Republican | Jodi Hack of Salem | Re-elected | Republican | Jodi Hack | 17,805 | 60.87% |
| 19 | Republican | Jodi Hack of Salem | Re-elected | Democratic | Larry Trott | 11,337 | 38.76% |
| 19 | Republican | Jodi Hack of Salem | Re-elected | | others | 110 | 0.38% |
| 20 | Democratic | Paul Evans of Monmouth | Re-elected | Democratic | Paul Evans | 17,408 | 52.92% |
| 20 | Democratic | Paul Evans of Monmouth | Re-elected | Republican | Laura Morett | 15,409 | 46.84% |
| 20 | Democratic | Paul Evans of Monmouth | Re-elected | | others | 77 | 0.23% |
| 21 | Democratic | Brian Clem of Salem | Re-elected | Democratic | Brian Clem | 12,313 | 55.52% |
| 21 | Democratic | Brian Clem of Salem | Re-elected | Republican | Doug Rodgers | 8,338 | 37.60% |
| 21 | Democratic | Brian Clem of Salem | Re-elected | Independent Party | Alvin Klausen | 1,420 | 6.42% |
| 21 | Democratic | Brian Clem of Salem | Re-elected | | others | 106 | 0.48% |
| 22 | Democratic | Betty Komp of Woodburn | Retired, Democratic hold | Democratic | Teresa Alonso Leon | 9,604 | 55.27% |
| 22 | Democratic | Betty Komp of Woodburn | Retired, Democratic hold | Republican | Patti Milne | 7,711 | 44.38% |
| 22 | Democratic | Betty Komp of Woodburn | Retired, Democratic hold | | others | 61 | 0.35% |
| 23 | Republican | Mike Nearman of Independence | Re-elected | Republican | Mike Nearman | 17,560 | 52.76% |
| 23 | Republican | Mike Nearman of Independence | Re-elected | Independent Party | Jim Thompson | 12,370 | 37.17% |
| 23 | Republican | Mike Nearman of Independence | Re-elected | Pacific Green | Alex Polikoff | 1,906 | 5.73% |
| 23 | Republican | Mike Nearman of Independence | Re-elected | | others | 1,448 | 4.35% |
| 24 | Republican | Jim Weidner of Yamhill | Retired, Republican hold | Republican | Ron Noble | 17,065 | 54.91% |
| 24 | Republican | Jim Weidner of Yamhill | Retired, Republican hold | Democratic | Ken Moore | 13,953 | 44.89% |
| 24 | Republican | Jim Weidner of Yamhill | Retired, Republican hold | | others | 62 | 0.20% |
| 25 | Republican | Bill Post of Keizer | Re-elected | Republican | Bill Post | 18,545 | 63.64% |
| 25 | Republican | Bill Post of Keizer | Re-elected | Democratic | Sharon Freeman | 10,523 | 36.11% |
| 25 | Republican | Bill Post of Keizer | Re-elected | | others | 71 | 0.24% |
| 26 | Republican | John Davis of Wilsonville | Retired, Republican hold | Republican | A. Richard Vial | 18,704 | 54.82% |
| 26 | Republican | John Davis of Wilsonville | Retired, Republican hold | Democratic | Ray Lister | 15,365 | 45.02% |
| 26 | Republican | John Davis of Wilsonville | Retired, Republican hold | | others | 47 | 0.14% |
| 27 | Democratic | Tobias Read of Beaverton | Retired, Democratic hold | Democratic | Sheri Malstrom | 22,504 | 97.83% |
| 27 | Democratic | Tobias Read of Beaverton | Retired, Democratic hold | | others | 500 | 2.17% |
| 28 | Democratic | Jeff Barker of Aloha | Re-elected | Democratic | Jeff Barker | 17,107 | 64.07% |
| 28 | Democratic | Jeff Barker of Aloha | Re-elected | Republican | Gary Carlson | 9,481 | 35.51% |
| 28 | Democratic | Jeff Barker of Aloha | Re-elected | | others | 112 | 0.42% |
| 29 | Democratic | Susan McLain of Forest Grove | Re-elected | Democratic | Susan McLain | 14,248 | 58.95% |
| 29 | Democratic | Susan McLain of Forest Grove | Re-elected | Republican | Juanita Lint | 9,833 | 40.68% |
| 29 | Democratic | Susan McLain of Forest Grove | Re-elected | | others | 90 | 0.37% |
| 30 | Democratic | Joe Gallegos of Hillsboro | Retired, Democratic hold | Democratic | Janeen Sollman | 15,336 | 52.22% |
| 30 | Democratic | Joe Gallegos of Hillsboro | Retired, Democratic hold | Republican | Dan Mason | 11,473 | 39.07% |
| 30 | Democratic | Joe Gallegos of Hillsboro | Retired, Democratic hold | Libertarian | Kyle Markley | 2,498 | 8.51% |
| 30 | Democratic | Joe Gallegos of Hillsboro | Retired, Democratic hold | | others | 61 | 0.21% |
| 31 | Democratic | Brad Witt of Clatskanie | Re-elected | Democratic | Brad Witt | 24,658 | 80.55% |
| 31 | Democratic | Brad Witt of Clatskanie | Re-elected | Libertarian | Robert Miller | 5,706 | 18.64% |
| 31 | Democratic | Brad Witt of Clatskanie | Re-elected | | others | 248 | 0.81% |
| 32 | Democratic | Deborah Boone of Cannon Beach | Re-elected | Democratic | Deborah Boone | 18,540 | 56.53% |
| 32 | Democratic | Deborah Boone of Cannon Beach | Re-elected | Republican | Bruce Bobek | 14,157 | 43.17% |
| 32 | Democratic | Deborah Boone of Cannon Beach | Re-elected | | others | 97 | 0.30% |
| 33 | Democratic | Mitch Greenlick of Portland | Re-elected | Democratic | Mitch Greenlick | 24,466 | 69.45% |
| 33 | Democratic | Mitch Greenlick of Portland | Re-elected | Republican | John Verbeek | 10,686 | 30.33% |
| 33 | Democratic | Mitch Greenlick of Portland | Re-elected | | others | 77 | 0.22% |
| 34 | Democratic | Ken Helm of Beaverton | Re-elected | Democratic | Ken Helm | 18,606 | 65.13% |
| 34 | Democratic | Ken Helm of Beaverton | Re-elected | Independent Party | Donald Hershiser | 9,875 | 34.57% |
| 34 | Democratic | Ken Helm of Beaverton | Re-elected | | others | 86 | 0.30% |
| 35 | Democratic | Margaret Doherty of Tigard | Re-elected | Democratic | Margaret Doherty | 19,609 | 62.32% |
| 35 | Democratic | Margaret Doherty of Tigard | Re-elected | Independent Party | Jessica Cousineau | 11,752 | 37.35% |
| 35 | Democratic | Margaret Doherty of Tigard | Re-elected | | others | 106 | 0.34% |
| 36 | Democratic | Jennifer Williamson of Portland | Re-elected | Democratic | Jennifer Williamson | 28,875 | 88.73% |
| 36 | Democratic | Jennifer Williamson of Portland | Re-elected | Libertarian | Amanda Burnham | 3,519 | 10.81% |
| 36 | Democratic | Jennifer Williamson of Portland | Re-elected | | others | 149 | 0.46% |
| 37 | Republican | Julie Parrish of West Linn | Re-elected | Republican | Julie Parrish | 18,971 | 53.81% |
| 37 | Republican | Julie Parrish of West Linn | Re-elected | Democratic | Paul Southwick | 15,393 | 43.66% |
| 37 | Republican | Julie Parrish of West Linn | Re-elected | | others | 893 | 2.53% |
| 38 | Democratic | Ann Lininger of Lake Oswego | Re-elected | Democratic | Ann Lininger | 26,675 | 69.69% |
| 38 | Democratic | Ann Lininger of Lake Oswego | Re-elected | Republican | Patrick De Klotz | 11,533 | 30.13% |
| 38 | Democratic | Ann Lininger of Lake Oswego | Re-elected | | others | 68 | 0.18% |
| 39 | Republican | Bill Kennemer of Oregon City | Re-elected | Republican | Bill Kennemer | 22,160 | 64.82% |
| 39 | Republican | Bill Kennemer of Oregon City | Re-elected | Democratic | Charles Gallia | 10,963 | 32.07% |
| 39 | Republican | Bill Kennemer of Oregon City | Re-elected | | others | 1,062 | 3.11% |
| 40 | Democratic | Brent Barton of Gladstone | Retired, Democratic hold | Democratic | Mark Meek | 16,282 | 51.03% |
| 40 | Democratic | Brent Barton of Gladstone | Retired, Democratic hold | Republican | Evon Tekorius | 13,829 | 43.34% |
| 40 | Democratic | Brent Barton of Gladstone | Retired, Democratic hold | | others | 1,798 | 5.63% |
| 41 | Democratic | Kathleen Taylor of Portland | Retired, Democratic hold | Democratic | Karin Power | 24,589 | 71.35% |
| 41 | Democratic | Kathleen Taylor of Portland | Retired, Democratic hold | Republican | Timothy E. McMenamin | 9,799 | 28.43% |
| 41 | Democratic | Kathleen Taylor of Portland | Retired, Democratic hold | | others | 76 | 0.22% |
| 42 | Democratic | Rob Nosse of Portland | Re-elected | Democratic | Rob Nosse | 33,894 | 88.71% |
| 42 | Democratic | Rob Nosse of Portland | Re-elected | Independent Party | James Stubbs | 2,459 | 6.44% |
| 42 | Democratic | Rob Nosse of Portland | Re-elected | | others | 1,854 | 4.85% |
| 43 | Democratic | Lew Frederick of Portland | Retired, Democratic hold | Democratic | Tawna Sanchez | 31,052 | 98.55% |
| 43 | Democratic | Lew Frederick of Portland | Retired, Democratic hold | | others | 457 | 1.45% |
| 44 | Democratic | Tina Kotek of Portland | Re-elected | Democratic | Tina Kotek | 23,288 | 80.34% |
| 44 | Democratic | Tina Kotek of Portland | Re-elected | Pacific Green | Joe Rowe | 5,700 | 19.50% |
| 44 | Democratic | Tina Kotek of Portland | Re-elected | | others | 242 | 0.83% |
| 45 | Democratic | Barbara Smith Warner of Portland | Re-elected | Democratic | Barbara Smith Warner | 24,843 | 98.07% |
| 45 | Democratic | Barbara Smith Warner of Portland | Re-elected | | others | 488 | 1.93% |
| 46 | Democratic | Alissa Keny-Guyer of Portland | Re-elected | Democratic | Alissa Keny-Guyer | 23,366 | 97.95% |
| 46 | Democratic | Alissa Keny-Guyer of Portland | Re-elected | | others | 489 | 2.05% |
| 47 | Democratic | Jessica Vega Pederson of Portland | Retired, Democratic hold | Democratic | Diego Hernandez | 14,323 | 66.91% |
| 47 | Democratic | Jessica Vega Pederson of Portland | Retired, Democratic hold | Independent Party | Michael Langley | 7,025 | 32.82% |
| 47 | Democratic | Jessica Vega Pederson of Portland | Retired, Democratic hold | | others | 59 | 0.28% |
| 48 | Democratic | Jeff Reardon of Happy Valley | Re-elected | Democratic | Jeff Reardon | 15,154 | 62.92% |
| 48 | Democratic | Jeff Reardon of Happy Valley | Re-elected | Republican | George (Sonny) Yellott | 6,774 | 28.13% |
| 48 | Democratic | Jeff Reardon of Happy Valley | Re-elected | | others | 2,155 | 8.95% |
| 49 | Democratic | Chris Gorsek of Troutdale | Re-elected | Democratic | Chris Gorsek | 16,075 | 96.50% |
| 49 | Democratic | Chris Gorsek of Troutdale | Re-elected | | others | 583 | 3.50% |
| 50 | Democratic | Carla Piluso of Gresham | Re-elected | Democratic | Carla Piluso | 11,840 | 50.25% |
| 50 | Democratic | Carla Piluso of Gresham | Re-elected | Republican | Stella Armstrong | 7,254 | 30.79% |
| 50 | Democratic | Carla Piluso of Gresham | Re-elected | Independent Party | Michael Calcagno | 4,433 | 18.82% |
| 50 | Democratic | Carla Piluso of Gresham | Re-elected | | others | 33 | 0.14% |
| 51 | Democratic | Shemia Fagan of Clackamas | Retired, Democratic hold | Democratic | Janelle Bynum | 14,310 | 50.85% |
| 51 | Democratic | Shemia Fagan of Clackamas | Retired, Democratic hold | Republican | Lori Chavez-Deremer | 13,746 | 48.85% |
| 51 | Democratic | Shemia Fagan of Clackamas | Retired, Democratic hold | | others | 86 | 0.31% |
| 52 | Republican | Mark Johnson of Hood River | Re-elected | Republican | Mark Johnson | 17,582 | 55.47% |
| 52 | Republican | Mark Johnson of Hood River | Re-elected | Democratic | Mark Reynolds | 14,047 | 44.32% |
| 52 | Republican | Mark Johnson of Hood River | Re-elected | | others | 66 | 0.21% |
| 53 | Republican | Gene Whisnant of Sunriver | Re-elected | Republican | Gene Whisnant | 24,425 | 67.45% |
| 53 | Republican | Gene Whisnant of Sunriver | Re-elected | Democratic | Michael Graham | 11,727 | 32.38% |
| 53 | Republican | Gene Whisnant of Sunriver | Re-elected | | others | 60 | 0.17% |
| 54 | Republican | Knute Buehler of Bend | Re-elected | Republican | Knute Buehler | 19,352 | 51.92% |
| 54 | Republican | Knute Buehler of Bend | Re-elected | Democratic | Gena Goodman-Campbell | 17,804 | 47.77% |
| 54 | Republican | Knute Buehler of Bend | Re-elected | | others | 117 | 0.31% |
| 55 | Republican | Mike McLane of Powell Butte | Re-elected | Republican | Mike McLane | 24,693 | 75.68% |
| 55 | Republican | Mike McLane of Powell Butte | Re-elected | Democratic | Brie Malarkey | 7,857 | 24.08% |
| 55 | Republican | Mike McLane of Powell Butte | Re-elected | | others | 77 | 0.24% |
| 56 | Republican | Gail Whitsett of Klamath Falls | Retired, Republican hold | Republican | E. Werner Reschke | 13,164 | 48.70% |
| 56 | Republican | Gail Whitsett of Klamath Falls | Retired, Republican hold | Democratic | Al Switzer | 10,882 | 40.26% |
| 56 | Republican | Gail Whitsett of Klamath Falls | Retired, Republican hold | | Jonah Hakanson | 2,918 | 10.80% |
| 56 | Republican | Gail Whitsett of Klamath Falls | Retired, Republican hold | | others | 66 | 0.24% |
| 57 | Republican | Greg Smith of Heppner | Re-elected | Republican | Greg Smith | 17,432 | 98.74% |
| 57 | Republican | Greg Smith of Heppner | Re-elected | | others | 222 | 1.26% |
| 58 | Republican | Greg Barreto of Cove | Re-elected | Republican | Greg Barreto | 23,010 | 97.29% |
| 58 | Republican | Greg Barreto of Cove | Re-elected | | others | 642 | 2.71% |
| 59 | Republican | John Huffman of The Dalles | Re-elected | Republican | John Huffman | 21,392 | 70.24% |
| 59 | Republican | John Huffman of The Dalles | Re-elected | Democratic | Tyler Gabriel | 8,982 | 29.49% |
| 59 | Republican | John Huffman of The Dalles | Re-elected | | others | 81 | 0.27% |
| 60 | Republican | Cliff Bentz of Ontario | Re-elected | Republican | Cliff Bentz | 22,339 | 98.14% |
| 60 | Republican | Cliff Bentz of Ontario | Re-elected | | others | 424 | 1.86% |

== Maps ==
Winning party by margin of victory

Winning party by district

House District 54

House District 56

== See also ==
- 78th Oregon Legislative Assembly (2015-2016)
- 79th Oregon Legislative Assembly (2017-2018)
