= 2018 Oregon legislative election =

2018 Oregon legislative elections
- November 6, 2018

17 seats in the Oregon State Senate 60 seats in the Oregon House of Representatives
| | Majority party | Minority party |
|---|---|---|
| Party | Democratic | Republican |
| Seats before | 52 (17 in Senate, 35 in House) | 38 (13 in Senate, 25 in House) |
| Seats after | 56 (18 in Senate, 38 in House) | 34 (12 in Senate, 22 in House) |
| Seat change | ▲4 ▲1 in Senate ▲3 in House | ▼4 ▼1 in Senate ▼3 in House |

The 2018 elections for the Oregon Legislative Assembly determined the composition of both houses for the 80th Oregon Legislative Assembly. The Republican and Democratic parties held primary elections on May 15, 2018, with general elections on November 6, 2018.

As a result of the elections, the Democratic Party expanded its advantage in both houses of the state legislature. The party gained one seat in the Oregon State Senate and three seats in the Oregon House of Representatives, bringing its advantage over the Republican Party to 18–12 and 38–22, respectively. These gains gave the Democratic Party a 3/5 (or 60%) supermajority in both chambers for the 80th Oregon Legislative Assembly.

== Oregon Senate ==
2018 Oregon State Senate elections
- November 6, 2018

17 of 30 seats in the Oregon State Senate 16 seats needed for a majority
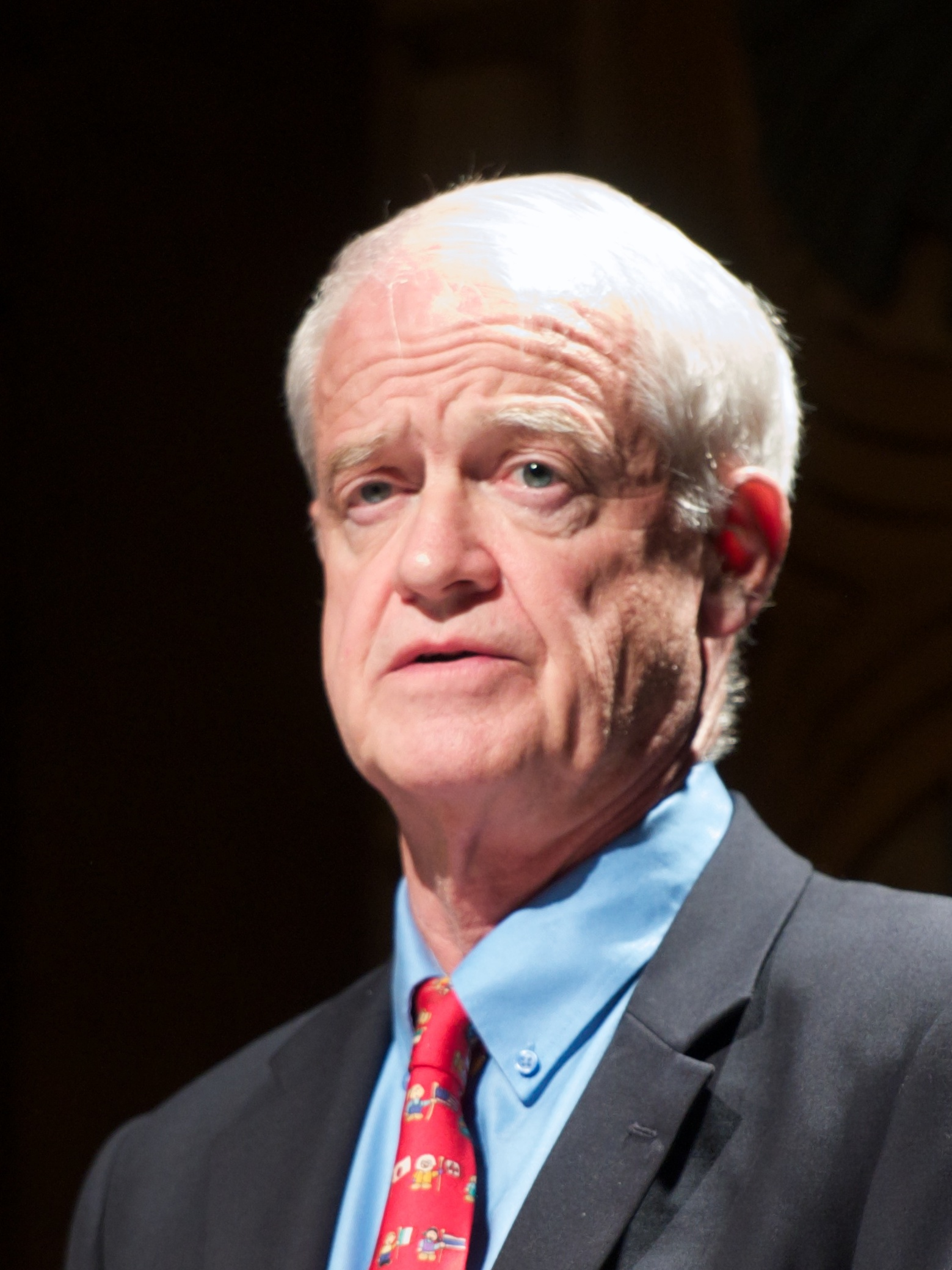

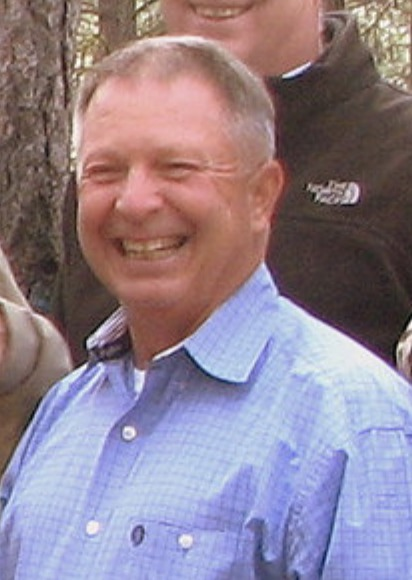
| | Majority party | Minority party |
|---|---|---|
| Leader | Peter Courtney | Herman Baertschiger Jr. |
| Party | Democratic | Republican |
| Leader's seat | 11th-Keizer | 2nd-Grants Pass |
| Seats before | 17 | 13 |
| Seats after | 18 | 12 |
| Seat change | ▲1 | ▼1 |
| Popular vote | 564,247 | 367,063 |
| Percentage | 59.23% | 38.53% |
| Swing | ▲8.28% | ▼5.74% |
- Results of the elections: Democratic gain Democratic hold Republican hold No election

The 30 members of the Oregon State Senate are elected to four-year terms, and only half of those seats (15) are up for election every two years. In addition to these 15 regular elections, there were two special elections to determine who would complete the four-year terms of senators who were replaced during the first half of their term. These 17 seats up for election were represented by 10 Democrats and seven Republicans. The Democrats decreased their advantage over Republicans from 18–12 to 17–13 in the 2016 election.

=== Predictions ===
| Source | Ranking | As of |
|---|---|---|
| Governing | Safe D | October 8, 2018 |

=== Open seat ===
- In District 3, incumbent Republican Alan DeBoer retired.

=== Results ===
| Affiliation | Candidates | Votes | Vote % | Seats won | Seats after |
|---|---|---|---|---|---|
| Democratic | 17 | 564,247 | 59.23% | 11 | 18 (▲1) |
| Republican | 13 | 367,063 | 38.53% | 6 | 12 (▼1) |
| Constitution Party | 1 | 10,637 | 1.12% | 0 | 0 |
| Libertarian | 3 | 4,126 | 0.43% | 0 | 0 |
| Others | N/A | 6,596 | 0.69% | 0 | 0 |
| Total | 34 | 952,669 | 100% | 17 | 30 |

| District | Party | Incumbent | Status | Party | Candidate | Votes | % |
|---|---|---|---|---|---|---|---|
| 1 (Special) (Note: This election decided who would complete the final two years of the four year term (2017-2020) to which Jeff Kruse was elected. Kruse resigned on March 15, 2018 due to a sex scandal. His successor, Dallas Heard, was appointed on April 9, 2018.) | Republican | Dallas Heard of Roseburg | Re-elected | Republican | Dallas Heard | 37,901 | 64.23% |
| 1 (Special) | Republican | Dallas Heard of Roseburg | Re-elected | Democratic | Shannon Souza | 21,012 | 35.61% |
| 1 (Special) | Republican | Dallas Heard of Roseburg | Re-elected | | others | 97 | 0.16% |
| 3 | Republican | Alan DeBoer of Ashland | Retired, Democratic gain | Democratic | Jeff Golden | 35,834 | 55.15% |
| 3 | Republican | Alan DeBoer of Ashland | Retired, Democratic gain | Republican | Jessica Gomez | 29,065 | 44.73% |
| 3 | Republican | Alan DeBoer of Ashland | Retired, Democratic gain | | others | 75 | 0.12% |
| 4 | Democratic | Floyd Prozanski of Eugene | Re-elected | Democratic | Floyd Prozanski | 38,623 | 59.15% |
| 4 | Democratic | Floyd Prozanski of Eugene | Re-elected | Republican | Scott Rohter | 25,031 | 38.33% |
| 4 | Democratic | Floyd Prozanski of Eugene | Re-elected | Libertarian | Frank Lengele, Jr. | 1,530 | 2.34% |
| 4 | Democratic | Floyd Prozanski of Eugene | Re-elected | | others | 117 | 0.18% |
| 6 | Democratic | Lee Beyer of Springfield | Re-elected | Democratic | Lee Beyer | 32,925 | 59.09% |
| 6 | Democratic | Lee Beyer of Springfield | Re-elected | Republican | Robert Schwartz | 22,671 | 40.69% |
| 6 | Democratic | Lee Beyer of Springfield | Re-elected | | others | 121 | 0.22% |
| 7 | Democratic | James Manning Jr. of Eugene | Re-elected | Democratic | James Manning Jr. | 38,262 | 94.69% |
| 7 | Democratic | James Manning Jr. of Eugene | Re-elected | | others | 2,146 | 5.31% |
| 8 | Democratic | Sara Gelser of Corvallis | Re-elected | Democratic | Sara Gelser | 38,119 | 62.99% |
| 8 | Democratic | Sara Gelser of Corvallis | Re-elected | Republican | Erik Parks | 20,959 | 34.63% |
| 8 | Democratic | Sara Gelser of Corvallis | Re-elected | Libertarian | Bryan Eggiman | 1,351 | 2.23% |
| 8 | Democratic | Sara Gelser of Corvallis | Re-elected | | others | 90 | 0.15% |
| 10 | Republican | Jackie Winters of Salem | Re-elected | Republican | Jackie Winters | 33,145 | 53.90% |
| 10 | Republican | Jackie Winters of Salem | Re-elected | Democratic | Deb Patterson | 28,210 | 45.88% |
| 10 | Republican | Jackie Winters of Salem | Re-elected | | others | 135 | 0.22% |
| 11 | Democratic | Peter Courtney of Salem | Re-elected | Democratic | Peter Courtney | 22,772 | 60.48% |
| 11 | Democratic | Peter Courtney of Salem | Re-elected | Republican | Greg Warnock | 14,760 | 39.20% |
| 11 | Democratic | Peter Courtney of Salem | Re-elected | | others | 119 | 0.32% |
| 13 | Republican | Kim Thatcher of Keizer | Re-elected | Republican | Kim Thatcher | 34,888 | 55.92% |
| 13 | Republican | Kim Thatcher of Keizer | Re-elected | Democratic | Sarah Grider | 27,415 | 43.94% |
| 13 | Republican | Kim Thatcher of Keizer | Re-elected | | others | 89 | 0.14% |
| 15 | Democratic | Chuck Riley of Hillsboro | Re-elected | Democratic | Chuck Riley | 30,770 | 59.26% |
| 15 | Democratic | Chuck Riley of Hillsboro | Re-elected | Republican | Alexander Flores | 21,037 | 40.52% |
| 15 | Democratic | Chuck Riley of Hillsboro | Re-elected | | others | 114 | 0.22% |
| 16 | Democratic | Betsy Johnson of Scappoose | Re-elected | Democratic | Betsy Johnson | 50,398 | 82.03% |
| 16 | Democratic | Betsy Johnson of Scappoose | Re-elected | Constitution | Ray Biggs | 10,637 | 17.31% |
| 16 | Democratic | Betsy Johnson of Scappoose | Re-elected | | others | 400 | 0.65% |
| 17 | Democratic | Elizabeth Steiner Hayward of Portland | Re-elected | Democratic | Elizabeth Steiner Hayward | 46,784 | 97.72% |
| 17 | Democratic | Elizabeth Steiner Hayward of Portland | Re-elected | | others | 1,094 | 2.28% |
| 19 | Democratic | Rob Wagner of Lake Oswego | Re-elected | Democratic | Rob Wagner | 47,521 | 65.50% |
| 19 | Democratic | Rob Wagner of Lake Oswego | Re-elected | Republican | David Poulson | 24,913 | 34.34% |
| 19 | Democratic | Rob Wagner of Lake Oswego | Re-elected | | others | 116 | 0.16% |
| 20 | Republican | Alan Olsen of Canby | Re-elected | Republican | Alan Olsen | 33,685 | 51.85% |
| 20 | Republican | Alan Olsen of Canby | Re-elected | Democratic | Charles Gallia | 29,927 | 46.06% |
| 20 | Republican | Alan Olsen of Canby | Re-elected | Libertarian | Kenny Sernach | 1,245 | 1.92% |
| 20 | Republican | Alan Olsen of Canby | Re-elected | | others | 111 | 0.17% |
| 24 | Democratic | Rod Monroe of Portland | Lost primary election, Democratic hold | Democratic | Shemia Fagan | 30,887 | 95.06% |
| 24 | Democratic | Rod Monroe of Portland | Lost primary election, Democratic hold | | others | 1,606 | 4.94% |
| 26 | Republican | Chuck Thomsen of Hood River | Re-elected | Republican | Chuck Thomsen | 29,472 | 50.11% |
| 26 | Republican | Chuck Thomsen of Hood River | Re-elected | Democratic | Chrissy Reitz | 29,263 | 49.76% |
| 26 | Republican | Chuck Thomsen of Hood River | Re-elected | | others | 79 | 0.13% |
| 30 (Special) (Note: This election decided who would complete the final two years of the four year term (2017-2020) to which Ted Ferrioli was elected. Ferrioli resigned on November 22, 2017 to accept an appointment to the Northwest Power and Conservation Council. His successor, Cliff Bentz, was appointed on January 4, 2018.) | Republican | Cliff Bentz of Ontario | Re-elected | Republican | Cliff Bentz | 39,536 | 71.69% |
| 30 (Special) | Republican | Cliff Bentz of Ontario | Re-elected | Democratic | Solea Kabakov | 15,525 | 28.15% |
| 30 (Special) | Republican | Cliff Bentz of Ontario | Re-elected | | others | 87 | 0.16% |

== Oregon House of Representatives ==
2018 Oregon House of Representatives elections
- November 6, 2018

60 seats of the Oregon House of Representatives 31 seats needed for a majority
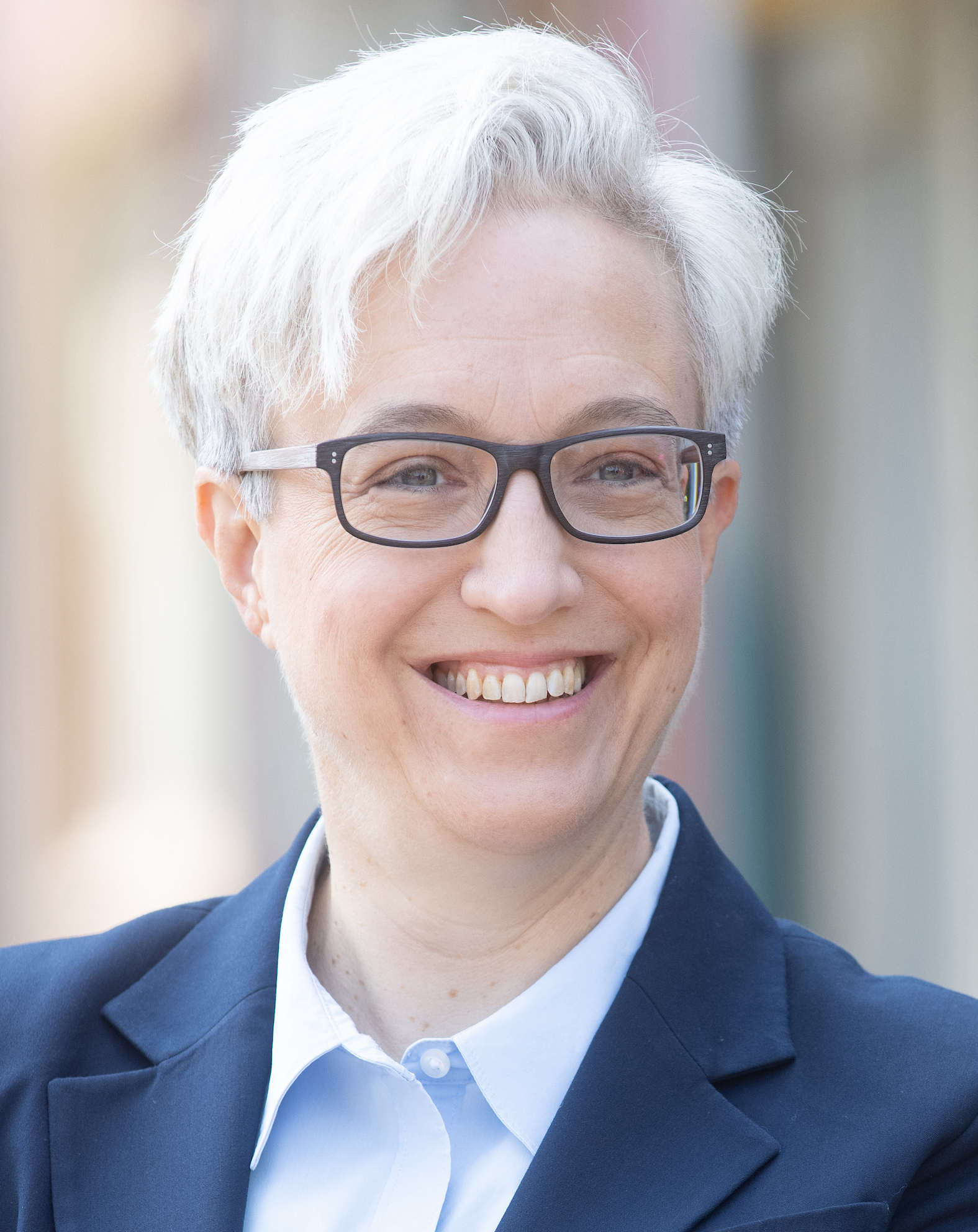

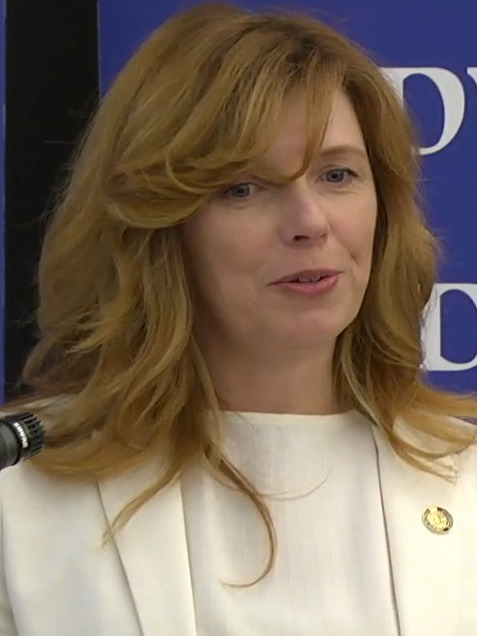
| | Majority party | Minority party |
|---|---|---|
| Leader | Tina Kotek | Christine Drazan |
| Party | Democratic | Republican |
| Leader since | January 2011 | September 16, 2019 |
| Leader's seat | 44th-N/NE Portland | 39th-Canby |
| Seats before | 35 | 25 |
| Seats after | 38 | 22 |
| Seat change | ▲3 | ▼3 |
| Popular vote | 960,817 | 666,608 |
| Percentage | 56.94% | 39.51% |
| Swing | ▲6.71% | ▼3.54% |
- Results; Democratic gain Democratic hold Republican hold

The 60 members of the Oregon House of Representatives are elected to two-year terms, so all 60 seats were up for election. In this election, these seats were represented by 35 Democrats and 25 Republicans. The Democrats maintained their 35–25 advantage in the 2016 election.

=== Predictions ===
| Source | Ranking | As of |
|---|---|---|
| Governing | Safe D | October 8, 2018 |

=== Open seats ===
- In District 6, incumbent Republican Sal Esquivel retired.
- In District 11, incumbent Democrat Phil Barnhart retired.
- In District 15, incumbent Republican Andy Olson retired.
- In District 32, incumbent Democrat Deborah Boone retired.
- In District 39, incumbent Republican Bill Kennemer retired.
- In District 53, incumbent Republican Gene Whisnant retired.
- In District 54, incumbent Republican Knute Buehler retired to run for Oregon governor.

=== Results ===
| Affiliation | Candidates | Votes | Vote % | Seats Won |
|---|---|---|---|---|
| Democratic | 56 | 960,817 | 56.94% | 38 (▲3) |
| Republican | 44 | 666,608 | 39.51% | 22 (▼3) |
| Libertarian | 12 | 23,991 | 1.42% | 0 |
| Independent | 4 | 18,607 | 1.10% | 0 |
| Working Families | 1 | 5,560 | 0.33% | 0 |
| Others | N/A | 11,785 | 0.70% | 0 |
| Total | 117 | 1,687,368 | 100% | 60 |

| District | Party | Incumbent | Status | Party | Candidate | Votes | % |
|---|---|---|---|---|---|---|---|
| 1 | Republican | David Brock Smith of Port Orford | Re-elected | Republican | David Brock Smith | 22,077 | 68.46% |
| 1 | Republican | David Brock Smith of Port Orford | Re-elected | Democratic | Eldon Rollins | 10,071 | 31.23% |
| 1 | Republican | David Brock Smith of Port Orford | Re-elected | | others | 100 | 0.31% |
| 2 | Republican | Gary Leif of Roseburg | Re-elected | Republican | Gary Leif | 17,104 | 66.11% |
| 2 | Republican | Gary Leif of Roseburg | Re-elected | Democratic | Megan Salter | 8,700 | 33.63% |
| 2 | Republican | Gary Leif of Roseburg | Re-elected | | others | 69 | 0.27% |
| 3 | Republican | Carl Wilson of Grants Pass | Re-elected | Republican | Carl Wilson | 17,104 | 69.15% |
| 3 | Republican | Carl Wilson of Grants Pass | Re-elected | Democratic | Jerry Morgan | 9,100 | 30.59% |
| 3 | Republican | Carl Wilson of Grants Pass | Re-elected | | others | 76 | 0.26% |
| 4 | Republican | Duane Stark of Grants Pass | Re-elected | Republican | Duane Stark | 17,440 | 98.21% |
| 4 | Republican | Duane Stark of Grants Pass | Re-elected | | others | 318 | 1.79% |
| 5 | Democratic | Pam Marsh of Ashland | Re-elected | Democratic | Pam Marsh | 24,643 | 67.98% |
| 5 | Democratic | Pam Marsh of Ashland | Re-elected | Republican | Sandra Abercrombie | 11,580 | 31.94% |
| 5 | Democratic | Pam Marsh of Ashland | Re-elected | | others | 28 | 0.08% |
| 6 | Republican | Sal Esquivel of Medford | Retired, Republican hold | Republican | Kim Wallan | 14,681 | 53.89% |
| 6 | Republican | Sal Esquivel of Medford | Retired, Republican hold | Democratic | Michelle Blum Atkinson | 12,530 | 45.99% |
| 6 | Republican | Sal Esquivel of Medford | Retired, Republican hold | | others | 32 | 0.12% |
| 7 | Republican | Cedric Ross Hayden of Fall Creek | Re-elected | Republican | Cedric Ross Hayden | 17,886 | 60.83% |
| 7 | Republican | Cedric Ross Hayden of Fall Creek | Re-elected | Democratic | Christy Inskip | 11,434 | 38.89% |
| 7 | Republican | Cedric Ross Hayden of Fall Creek | Re-elected | | others | 83 | 0.28% |
| 8 | Democratic | Paul Holvey of Eugene | Re-elected | Democratic | Paul Holvey | 25,835 | 79.85% |
| 8 | Democratic | Paul Holvey of Eugene | Re-elected | Libertarian | Martha Sherwood | 6,310 | 19.50% |
| 8 | Democratic | Paul Holvey of Eugene | Re-elected | | others | 210 | 0.65% |
| 9 | Democratic | Caddy McKeown of Coos Bay | Re-elected | Democratic | Caddy McKeown | 16,181 | 54.10% |
| 9 | Democratic | Caddy McKeown of Coos Bay | Re-elected | Republican | Teri Grier | 13,610 | 45.50% |
| 9 | Democratic | Caddy McKeown of Coos Bay | Re-elected | | others | 118 | 0.39% |
| 10 | Democratic | David Gomberg of Otis | Re-elected | Democratic | David Gomberg | 17,713 | 57.16% |
| 10 | Democratic | David Gomberg of Otis | Re-elected | Republican | Thomas Donohue | 13,232 | 42.70% |
| 10 | Democratic | David Gomberg of Otis | Re-elected | | others | 44 | 0.14% |
| 11 | Democratic | Phil Barnhart of Eugene | Retired, Democratic hold | Democratic | Marty Wilde | 18,132 | 56.92% |
| 11 | Democratic | Phil Barnhart of Eugene | Retired, Democratic hold | Republican | Mark Herbert | 13,690 | 42.97% |
| 11 | Democratic | Phil Barnhart of Eugene | Retired, Democratic hold | | others | 34 | 0.11% |
| 12 | Democratic | John Lively of Springfield | Re-elected | Democratic | John Lively | 16,388 | 95.23% |
| 12 | Democratic | John Lively of Springfield | Re-elected | | others | 820 | 4.77% |
| 13 | Democratic | Nancy Nathanson of Eugene | Re-elected | Democratic | Nancy Nathanson | 21,387 | 96.72% |
| 13 | Democratic | Nancy Nathanson of Eugene | Re-elected | | others | 725 | 3.28% |
| 14 | Democratic | Julie Fahey of Eugene | Re-elected | Democratic | Julie Fahey | 17,264 | 61.01% |
| 14 | Democratic | Julie Fahey of Eugene | Re-elected | Republican | Rich Cunningham | 10,969 | 38.76% |
| 14 | Democratic | Julie Fahey of Eugene | Re-elected | | others | 64 | 0.23% |
| 15 | Republican | Andy Olson of Albany | Retired, Republican hold | Republican | Shelly Boshart Davis | 17,480 | 56.30% |
| 15 | Republican | Andy Olson of Albany | Retired, Republican hold | Democratic | Jerred Taylor | 11,991 | 38.62% |
| 15 | Republican | Andy Olson of Albany | Retired, Republican hold | Independent Party | Cynthia Hyatt | 1,539 | 4.96% |
| 15 | Republican | Andy Olson of Albany | Retired, Republican hold | | others | 40 | 0.13% |
| 16 | Democratic | Dan Rayfield of Corvallis | Re-elected | Democratic | Dan Rayfield | 23,158 | 97.44% |
| 16 | Democratic | Dan Rayfield of Corvallis | Re-elected | | others | 609 | 2.56% |
| 17 | Republican | Sherrie Sprenger of Scio | Re-elected | Republican | Sherrie Sprenger | 20,880 | 71.18% |
| 17 | Republican | Sherrie Sprenger of Scio | Re-elected | Democratic | Renee Windsor-White | 8,384 | 28.58% |
| 17 | Republican | Sherrie Sprenger of Scio | Re-elected | | others | 69 | 0.24% |
| 18 | Republican | Rick Lewis of Silverton | Re-elected | Republican | Rick Lewis | 18,950 | 65.94% |
| 18 | Republican | Rick Lewis of Silverton | Re-elected | Democratic | Barry Shapiro | 9,731 | 33.86% |
| 18 | Republican | Rick Lewis of Silverton | Re-elected | | others | 57 | 0.20% |
| 19 | Republican | Denyc Boles of Salem | Re-elected | Republican | Denyc Boles | 15,778 | 53.25% |
| 19 | Republican | Denyc Boles of Salem | Re-elected | Democratic | Mike Ellison | 13,795 | 46.56% |
| 19 | Republican | Denyc Boles of Salem | Re-elected | | others | 55 | 0.19% |
| 20 | Democratic | Paul Evans of Monmouth | Re-elected | Democratic | Paul Evans | 16,907 | 53.43% |
| 20 | Democratic | Paul Evans of Monmouth | Re-elected | Republican | Selma Pierce | 14,652 | 46.30% |
| 20 | Democratic | Paul Evans of Monmouth | Re-elected | | others | 84 | 0.27% |
| 21 | Democratic | Brian L. Clem of Salem | Re-elected | Democratic | Brian L. Clem | 13,440 | 63.50% |
| 21 | Democratic | Brian L. Clem of Salem | Re-elected | Republican | Jack Esp | 7,632 | 36.06% |
| 21 | Democratic | Brian L. Clem of Salem | Re-elected | | others | 92 | 0.43% |
| 22 | Democratic | Teresa Alonso Leon of Woodburn | Re-elected | Democratic | Teresa Alonso Leon | 9,630 | 59.63% |
| 22 | Democratic | Teresa Alonso Leon of Woodburn | Re-elected | Republican | Marty Heyen | 6,486 | 40.16% |
| 22 | Democratic | Teresa Alonso Leon of Woodburn | Re-elected | | others | 33 | 0.20% |
| 23 | Republican | Mike Nearman of Independence | Re-elected | Republican | Mike Nearman | 17,971 | 54.35% |
| 23 | Republican | Mike Nearman of Independence | Re-elected | Democratic | Danny Jaffer | 14,317 | 43.30% |
| 23 | Republican | Mike Nearman of Independence | Re-elected | Libertarian | Mark Karnowski | 738 | 2.23% |
| 23 | Republican | Mike Nearman of Independence | Re-elected | | others | 37 | 0.11% |
| 24 | Republican | Ron Noble of McMinnville | Re-elected | Republican | Ron Noble | 16,762 | 55.57% |
| 24 | Republican | Ron Noble of McMinnville | Re-elected | Democratic | Ken Moore | 13,370 | 44.32% |
| 24 | Republican | Ron Noble of McMinnville | Re-elected | | others | 32 | 0.11% |
| 25 | Republican | Bill Post of Keizer | Re-elected | Republican | Bill Post | 16,736 | 58.32% |
| 25 | Republican | Bill Post of Keizer | Re-elected | Democratic | Dave McCall | 11,926 | 41.56% |
| 25 | Republican | Bill Post of Keizer | Re-elected | | others | 36 | 0.13% |
| 26 | Republican | Rich Vial of Scholls | Lost re-election, Democratic gain | Democratic | Courtney Neron Misslin | 17,211 | 50.82% |
| 26 | Republican | Rich Vial of Scholls | Lost re-election, Democratic gain | Republican | Rich Vial | 15,928 | 47.03% |
| 26 | Republican | Rich Vial of Scholls | Lost re-election, Democratic gain | Libertarian | Tim Nelson | 683 | 2.02% |
| 26 | Republican | Rich Vial of Scholls | Lost re-election, Democratic gain | | others | 46 | 0.14% |
| 27 | Democratic | Sheri Malstrom of Beaverton | Re-elected | Democratic | Sheri Malstrom | 20,286 | 66.28% |
| 27 | Democratic | Sheri Malstrom of Beaverton | Re-elected | Independent Party | Brian Pierson | 9,361 | 30.58% |
| 27 | Democratic | Sheri Malstrom of Beaverton | Re-elected | Libertarian | Katy Brumbelow | 924 | 3.02% |
| 27 | Democratic | Sheri Malstrom of Beaverton | Re-elected | | others | 36 | 0.12% |
| 28 | Democratic | Jeff Barker of Aloha | Re-elected | Democratic | Jeff Barker | 20,789 | 84.23% |
| 28 | Democratic | Jeff Barker of Aloha | Re-elected | Libertarian | Lars Hedbor | 3,680 | 14.91% |
| 28 | Democratic | Jeff Barker of Aloha | Re-elected | | others | 213 | 0.86% |
| 29 | Democratic | Susan McLain of Forest Grove | Re-elected | Democratic | Susan McLain | 13,652 | 58.62% |
| 29 | Democratic | Susan McLain of Forest Grove | Re-elected | Republican | David Molina | 9,166 | 39.36% |
| 29 | Democratic | Susan McLain of Forest Grove | Re-elected | Libertarian | William Namestnik | 442 | 1.90% |
| 29 | Democratic | Susan McLain of Forest Grove | Re-elected | | others | 28 | 0.12% |
| 30 | Democratic | Janeen Sollman of Hillsboro | Re-elected | Democratic | Janeen Sollman | 17,459 | 61.67% |
| 30 | Democratic | Janeen Sollman of Hillsboro | Re-elected | Republican | Dorothy Merritt | 8,630 | 30.48% |
| 30 | Democratic | Janeen Sollman of Hillsboro | Re-elected | Libertarian | Kyle Markley | 2,188 | 7.73% |
| 30 | Democratic | Janeen Sollman of Hillsboro | Re-elected | | others | 34 | 0.12% |
| 31 | Democratic | Brad Witt of Clatskanie | Re-elected | Democratic | Brad Witt | 17,491 | 53.93% |
| 31 | Democratic | Brad Witt of Clatskanie | Re-elected | Republican | Brian Stout | 14,870 | 45.85% |
| 31 | Democratic | Brad Witt of Clatskanie | Re-elected | | others | 73 | 0.23% |
| 32 | Democratic | Deborah Boone of Cannon Beach | Retired, Democratic hold | Democratic | Tiffiny Mitchell | 15,442 | 49.03% |
| 32 | Democratic | Deborah Boone of Cannon Beach | Retired, Democratic hold | Republican | Vineeta Lower | 13,618 | 43.24% |
| 32 | Democratic | Deborah Boone of Cannon Beach | Retired, Democratic hold | Independent Party | Brian Halvorsen | 1,325 | 4.21% |
| 32 | Democratic | Deborah Boone of Cannon Beach | Retired, Democratic hold | Libertarian | Randell Carson | 1,061 | 3.37% |
| 32 | Democratic | Deborah Boone of Cannon Beach | Retired, Democratic hold | | others | 47 | 0.15% |
| 33 | Democratic | Mitch Greenlick of Portland | Re-elected | Democratic | Mitch Greenlick | 26,901 | 75.86% |
| 33 | Democratic | Mitch Greenlick of Portland | Re-elected | Republican | Elizabeth Reye | 8,500 | 23.97% |
| 33 | Democratic | Mitch Greenlick of Portland | Re-elected | | others | 61 | 0.17% |
| 34 | Democratic | Ken Helm of Beaverton | Re-elected | Democratic | Ken Helm | 19,470 | 69.24% |
| 34 | Democratic | Ken Helm of Beaverton | Re-elected | Republican | Michael Ngo | 7,041 | 25.04% |
| 34 | Democratic | Ken Helm of Beaverton | Re-elected | Libertarian | Joshua Ryan Johnston | 1,558 | 5.54% |
| 34 | Democratic | Ken Helm of Beaverton | Re-elected | | others | 49 | 0.17% |
| 35 | Democratic | Margaret Doherty of Tigard | Re-elected | Democratic | Margaret Doherty | 22,136 | 67.29% |
| 35 | Democratic | Margaret Doherty of Tigard | Re-elected | Republican | Bob Niemeyer | 10,704 | 32.54% |
| 35 | Democratic | Margaret Doherty of Tigard | Re-elected | | others | 55 | 0.17% |
| 36 | Democratic | Jennifer Williamson of Portland | Re-elected | Democratic | Jennifer Williamson | 28,081 | 98.05% |
| 36 | Democratic | Jennifer Williamson of Portland | Re-elected | | others | 559 | 1.95% |
| 37 | Republican | Julie Parrish of West Linn | Lost re-election, Democratic gain | Democratic | Rachel Prusak | 18,357 | 52.69% |
| 37 | Republican | Julie Parrish of West Linn | Lost re-election, Democratic gain | Republican | Julie Parrish | 16,434 | 47.17% |
| 37 | Republican | Julie Parrish of West Linn | Lost re-election, Democratic gain | | others | 51 | 0.15% |
| 38 | Democratic | Andrea Salinas of Lake Oswego | Re-elected | Democratic | Andrea Salinas | 25,974 | 97.63% |
| 38 | Democratic | Andrea Salinas of Lake Oswego | Re-elected | | others | 631 | 2.37% |
| 39 | Republican | Bill Kennemer of Oregon City | Retired, Republican hold | Republican | Christine Drazan | 19,732 | 59.07% |
| 39 | Republican | Bill Kennemer of Oregon City | Retired, Republican hold | Democratic | Elizabeth Graser-Lindsey | 13,611 | 40.74% |
| 39 | Republican | Bill Kennemer of Oregon City | Retired, Republican hold | | others | 63 | 0.19% |
| 40 | Democratic | Mark Meek of Gladstone | Re-elected | Democratic | Mark Meek | 17,428 | 55.62% |
| 40 | Democratic | Mark Meek of Gladstone | Re-elected | Republican | Josh Hill | 13,833 | 44.15% |
| 40 | Democratic | Mark Meek of Gladstone | Re-elected | | others | 72 | 0.23% |
| 41 | Democratic | Karin Power of Milwaukie | Re-elected | Democratic | Karin Power | 23,638 | 97.14% |
| 41 | Democratic | Karin Power of Milwaukie | Re-elected | | others | 696 | 2.86% |
| 42 | Democratic | Rob Nosse of Portland | Re-elected | Democratic | Rob Nosse | 37,222 | 93.68% |
| 42 | Democratic | Rob Nosse of Portland | Re-elected | Libertarian | Bruce Alexander Knight | 2,400 | 6.04% |
| 42 | Democratic | Rob Nosse of Portland | Re-elected | | others | 110 | 0.28% |
| 43 | Democratic | Tawna Sanchez of Portland | Re-elected | Democratic | Tawna Sanchez | 31,885 | 98.68% |
| 43 | Democratic | Tawna Sanchez of Portland | Re-elected | | others | 425 | 1.32% |
| 44 | Democratic | Tina Kotek of Portland | Re-elected | Democratic | Tina Kotek | 27,194 | 89.07% |
| 44 | Democratic | Tina Kotek of Portland | Re-elected | Libertarian | Manny Guerra | 3,181 | 10.42% |
| 44 | Democratic | Tina Kotek of Portland | Re-elected | | others | 155 | 0.51% |
| 45 | Democratic | Barbara Smith Warner of Portland | Re-elected | Democratic | Barbara Smith Warner | 25,695 | 97.73% |
| 45 | Democratic | Barbara Smith Warner of Portland | Re-elected | | others | 598 | 2.27% |
| 46 | Democratic | Alissa Keny-Guyer of Portland | Re-elected | Democratic | Alissa Keny-Guyer | 24,573 | 97.69% |
| 46 | Democratic | Alissa Keny-Guyer of Portland | Re-elected | | others | 581 | 2.31% |
| 47 | Democratic | Diego Hernandez of Portland | Re-elected | Democratic | Diego Hernandez | 14,741 | 95.98% |
| 47 | Democratic | Diego Hernandez of Portland | Re-elected | | others | 618 | 4.02% |
| 48 | Democratic | Jeff Reardon of Happy Valley | Re-elected | Democratic | Jeff Reardon | 16,250 | 69.36% |
| 48 | Democratic | Jeff Reardon of Happy Valley | Re-elected | Republican | Sonny Yellott | 7,079 | 30.22% |
| 48 | Democratic | Jeff Reardon of Happy Valley | Re-elected | | others | 98 | 0.42% |
| 49 | Democratic | Chris Gorsek of Troutdale | Re-elected | Democratic | Chris Gorsek | 11,045 | 51.25% |
| 49 | Democratic | Chris Gorsek of Troutdale | Re-elected | Republican | Justin Hwang | 9,658 | 44.82% |
| 49 | Democratic | Chris Gorsek of Troutdale | Re-elected | Libertarian | Heather Ricks | 826 | 3.83% |
| 49 | Democratic | Chris Gorsek of Troutdale | Re-elected | | others | 21 | 0.10% |
| 50 | Democratic | Carla Piluso of Gresham | Re-elected | Democratic | Carla Piluso | 14,595 | 93.83% |
| 50 | Democratic | Carla Piluso of Gresham | Re-elected | | others | 960 | 6.17% |
| 51 | Democratic | Janelle Bynum of Happy Valley | Re-elected | Democratic | Janelle Bynum | 14,843 | 53.92% |
| 51 | Democratic | Janelle Bynum of Happy Valley | Re-elected | Republican | Lori Chavez-DeRemer | 12,620 | 45.85% |
| 51 | Democratic | Janelle Bynum of Happy Valley | Re-elected | | others | 63 | 0.23% |
| 52 | Republican | Jeff Helfrich of Hood River | Lost re-election, Democratic gain | Democratic | Anna Williams | 16,135 | 51.36% |
| 52 | Republican | Jeff Helfrich of Hood River | Lost re-election, Democratic gain | Republican | Jeff Helfrich | 15,238 | 48.51% |
| 52 | Republican | Jeff Helfrich of Hood River | Lost re-election, Democratic gain | | others | 41 | 0.13% |
| 53 | Republican | Gene Whisnant of Sunriver | Retired, Republican hold | Republican | Jack Zika | 21,063 | 56.44% |
| 53 | Republican | Gene Whisnant of Sunriver | Retired, Republican hold | Democratic | Eileen Kiely | 16,207 | 43.42% |
| 53 | Republican | Gene Whisnant of Sunriver | Retired, Republican hold | | others | 52 | 0.14% |
| 54 | Republican | Knute Buehler of Bend | Retired, Republican hold | Republican | Cheri Helt | 21,134 | 58.12% |
| 54 | Republican | Knute Buehler of Bend | Retired, Republican hold | Democratic | Nathan Boddie | 9,000 | 24.75% |
| 54 | Republican | Knute Buehler of Bend | Retired, Republican hold | Working Families | Amanda La Bell | 5,560 | 15.29% |
| 54 | Republican | Knute Buehler of Bend | Retired, Republican hold | | others | 670 | 1.84% |
| 55 | Republican | Mike McLane of Powell Butte | Re-elected | Republican | Mike McLane | 23,832 | 73.19% |
| 55 | Republican | Mike McLane of Powell Butte | Re-elected | Democratic | Karen Rippberger | 8,694 | 26.70% |
| 55 | Republican | Mike McLane of Powell Butte | Re-elected | | others | 37 | 0.11% |
| 56 | Republican | E. Werner Reschke of Klamath Falls | Re-elected | Republican | E. Werner Reschke | 18,312 | 71.78% |
| 56 | Republican | E. Werner Reschke of Klamath Falls | Re-elected | Democratic | Taylor Tupper | 7,130 | 27.95% |
| 56 | Republican | E. Werner Reschke of Klamath Falls | Re-elected | | others | 68 | 0.27% |
| 57 | Republican | Greg Smith of Heppner | Re-elected | Republican | Greg Smith | 15,794 | 98.20% |
| 57 | Republican | Greg Smith of Heppner | Re-elected | | others | 289 | 1.80% |
| 58 | Republican | Greg Barreto of Cove | Re-elected | Republican | Greg Barreto | 19,828 | 75.38% |
| 58 | Republican | Greg Barreto of Cove | Re-elected | Independent Party | Skye Farnam | 6,382 | 24.26% |
| 58 | Republican | Greg Barreto of Cove | Re-elected | | others | 94 | 0.36% |
| 59 | Republican | Daniel Bonham of The Dalles | Re-elected | Republican | Daniel Bonham | 19,236 | 62.22% |
| 59 | Republican | Daniel Bonham of The Dalles | Re-elected | Democratic | Darcy Long-Curtiss | 11,655 | 37.70% |
| 59 | Republican | Daniel Bonham of The Dalles | Re-elected | | others | 27 | 0.09% |
| 60 | Republican | Lynn Findley of Vale | Re-elected | Republican | Lynn Findley | 18,194 | 98.38% |
| 60 | Republican | Lynn Findley of Vale | Re-elected | | others | 299 | 1.62% |

== See also ==
- 79th Oregon Legislative Assembly (2017–2018)
- 80th Oregon Legislative Assembly (2019–2020)
