= 79th Oregon Legislative Assembly =

←	78th Legislative Assembly	80th Legislative Assembly	→
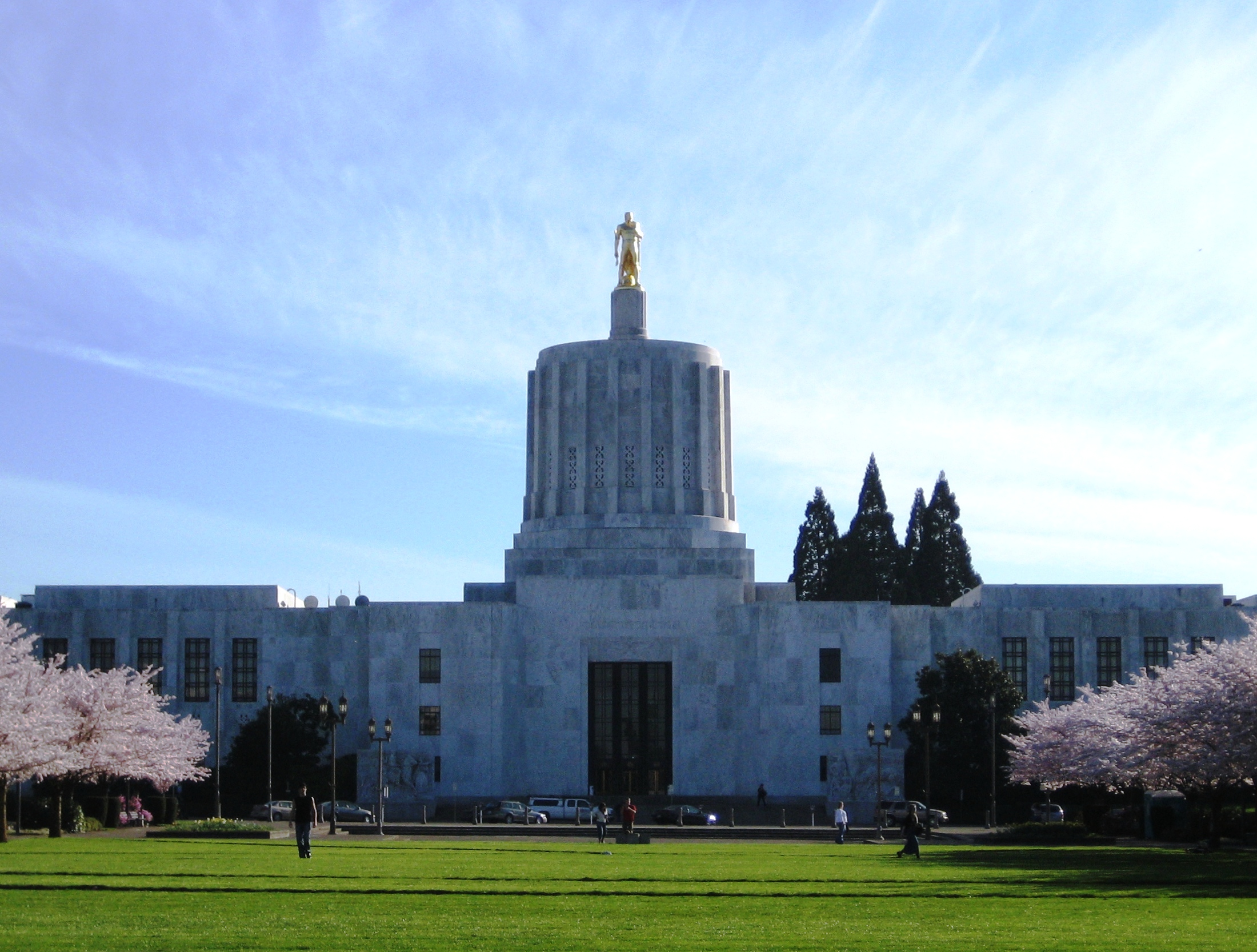
- The legislature took place in the Oregon State Capitol, seen here in 2007

Overview
- Legislative body: Oregon Legislative Assembly
- Jurisdiction: Oregon, United States
- Meeting place: Oregon State Capitol
- Term: 2017–2019
- Website: www.oregonlegislature.gov

Oregon State Senate
- Members: 30 Senators
- Senate President: Peter Courtney (D)
- Majority Leader: Ginny Burdick (D)
- Minority Leader: Jackie Winters (R)
- Party control: Democratic

Oregon House of Representatives
- Members: 60 Representatives
- Speaker of the House: Tina Kotek (D)
- Majority Leader: Jennifer Williamson (D)
- Minority Leader: Mike McLane (R)
- Party control: Democratic

Current map of Senators

The 79th Oregon Legislative Assembly was the meeting of the Oregon Legislative Assembly from January 9, 2017 until May 21, 2018.

In the November 2016 elections, the Democratic Party of Oregon lost one seat in the Senate leaving a 17–13 majority and maintaining its 35–25 control of the House.

== Senate ==
Based on the results of the 2016 elections, the Oregon State Senate is composed of 17 Democrats and 13 Republicans. Republicans gained one seat in District 3.

== Senate members ==
Senate President: Peter Courtney (D–11 Salem)
President Pro Tempore: Laurie Monnes Anderson (D–25 Gresham)
Majority Leader: Ginny Burdick (D–18 Portland)
Minority Leader: Ted Ferrioli (R–30 John Day) until November 2017; Jackie Winters (R-10 Salem) after November 2017

District	Home	Senator	Party
1	Roseburg	Jeff Kruse	Republican
1	Roseburg	Dallas Heard	Republican
2	Grants Pass	Herman Baertschiger Jr.	Republican
3	Medford	Alan DeBoer	Republican
4	Eugene	Floyd Prozanski	Democratic
5	Coos Bay	Arnie Roblan	Democratic
6	Springfield	Lee Beyer	Democratic
7	Eugene	James Manning Jr.	Democratic
8	Corvallis	Sara Gelser	Democratic
9	Molalla	Fred Girod	Republican
10	Salem	Jackie Winters	Republican
11	Salem	Peter Courtney	Democratic
12	McMinnville	Brian Boquist	Republican
13	Keizer	Kim Thatcher	Republican
14	Beaverton	Mark Hass	Democratic
15	Hillsboro	Chuck Riley	Democratic
16	Scappoose	Betsy Johnson	Democratic
17	Portland	Elizabeth Steiner Hayward	Democratic
18	Portland	Ginny Burdick	Democratic
19	Tualatin	Richard Devlin	Democratic
19	Lake Oswego	Rob Wagner	Democratic
20	Canby	Alan Olsen	Republican
21	Portland	Kathleen Taylor	Democratic
22	Portland	Lew Frederick	Democratic
23	Portland	Michael Dembrow	Democratic
24	Portland	Rod Monroe	Democratic
25	Gresham	Laurie Monnes Anderson	Democratic
26	Hood River	Chuck Thomsen	Republican
27	Bend	Tim Knopp	Republican
28	Bonanza	Dennis Linthicum	Republican
29	Pendleton	Bill Hansell	Republican
30	John Day	Ted Ferrioli	Republican
30	Ontario	Cliff Bentz	Republican

== House members ==
Current composition

Based on the results of the 2016 elections, the Oregon House of Representatives is composed of 35 Democrats and 25 Republicans. Neither party made any net gains.

Speaker: Tina Kotek (D–44 Portland)
Speaker Pro Tempore: Paul Holvey (D-8 Eugene)
Majority Leader: Jennifer Williamson (D–36 Portland)
Minority Leader: Mike McLane (R–55 Powell Butte)

District	Home	Representative	Party
1	Port Orford	David Brock Smith	Republican
2	Roseburg	Dallas Heard	Republican
2	Roseburg	Gary Leif	Republican
3	Grants Pass	Carl Wilson	Republican
4	Grants Pass	Duane Stark	Republican
5	Ashland	Pam Marsh	Democratic
6	Medford	Sal Esquivel	Republican
7	Fall Creek	Cedric Ross Hayden	Republican
8	Eugene	Paul Holvey	Democratic
9	Coos Bay	Caddy McKeown	Democratic
10	Otis	David Gomberg	Democratic
11	Eugene	Phil Barnhart	Democratic
12	Springfield	John Lively	Democratic
13	Eugene	Nancy Nathanson	Democratic
14	Eugene	Julie Fahey	Democratic
15	Albany	Andy Olson	Republican
16	Corvallis	Dan Rayfield	Democratic
17	Scio	Sherrie Sprenger	Republican
18	Silverton	Vic Gilliam	Republican
18	Silverton	Rick Lewis	Republican
19	Salem	Jodi Hack	Republican
19	Salem	Denyc Boles	Republican
20	Monmouth	Paul Evans	Democratic
21	Salem	Brian L. Clem	Democratic
22	Woodburn	Teresa Alonso Leon	Democratic
23	Independence	Mike Nearman	Republican
24	McMinnville	Ron Noble	Republican
25	Keizer	Bill Post	Republican
26	Scholls	A. Richard Vial	Republican
27	Beaverton	Sheri Malstrom	Democratic
28	Aloha	Jeff Barker	Democratic
29	Forest Grove	Susan McLain	Democratic
30	Hillsboro	Janeen Sollman	Democratic
31	Clatskanie	Brad Witt	Democratic
32	Cannon Beach	Deborah Boone	Democratic
33	Portland	Mitch Greenlick	Democratic
34	Beaverton	Ken Helm	Democratic
35	Tigard	Margaret Doherty	Democratic
36	Portland	Jennifer Williamson	Democratic
37	West Linn	Julie Parrish	Republican
38	Lake Oswego	Ann Lininger	Democratic
38	Lake Oswego	Andrea Salinas	Democratic
39	Oregon City	Bill Kennemer	Republican
40	Gladstone	Mark Meek	Democratic
41	Milwaukie	Karin Power	Democratic
42	Portland	Rob Nosse	Democratic
43	Portland	Tawna Sanchez	Democratic
44	Portland	Tina Kotek	Democratic
45	Portland	Barbara Smith Warner	Democratic
46	Portland	Alissa Keny-Guyer	Democratic
47	Portland	Diego Hernandez	Democratic
48	Happy Valley	Jeff Reardon	Democratic
49	Troutdale	Chris Gorsek	Democratic
50	Gresham	Carla Piluso	Democratic
51	Happy Valley	Janelle Bynum	Democratic
52	Hood River	Mark Johnson	Republican
52	Hood River	Jeff Helfrich	Republican
53	Sunriver	Gene Whisnant	Republican
54	Bend	Knute Buehler	Republican
55	Powell Butte	Mike McLane	Republican
56	Klamath Falls	E. Werner Reschke	Republican
57	Heppner	Greg Smith	Republican
58	Cove	Greg Barreto	Republican
59	The Dalles	John Huffman	Republican
59	The Dalles	Daniel Bonham	Republican
60	Ontario	Cliff Bentz	Republican
60	Vale	Lynn Findley	Republican

== See also ==
- Oregon legislative elections, 2016
