= 78th Oregon Legislative Assembly =

←	77th Legislative Assembly	79th Legislative Assembly	→
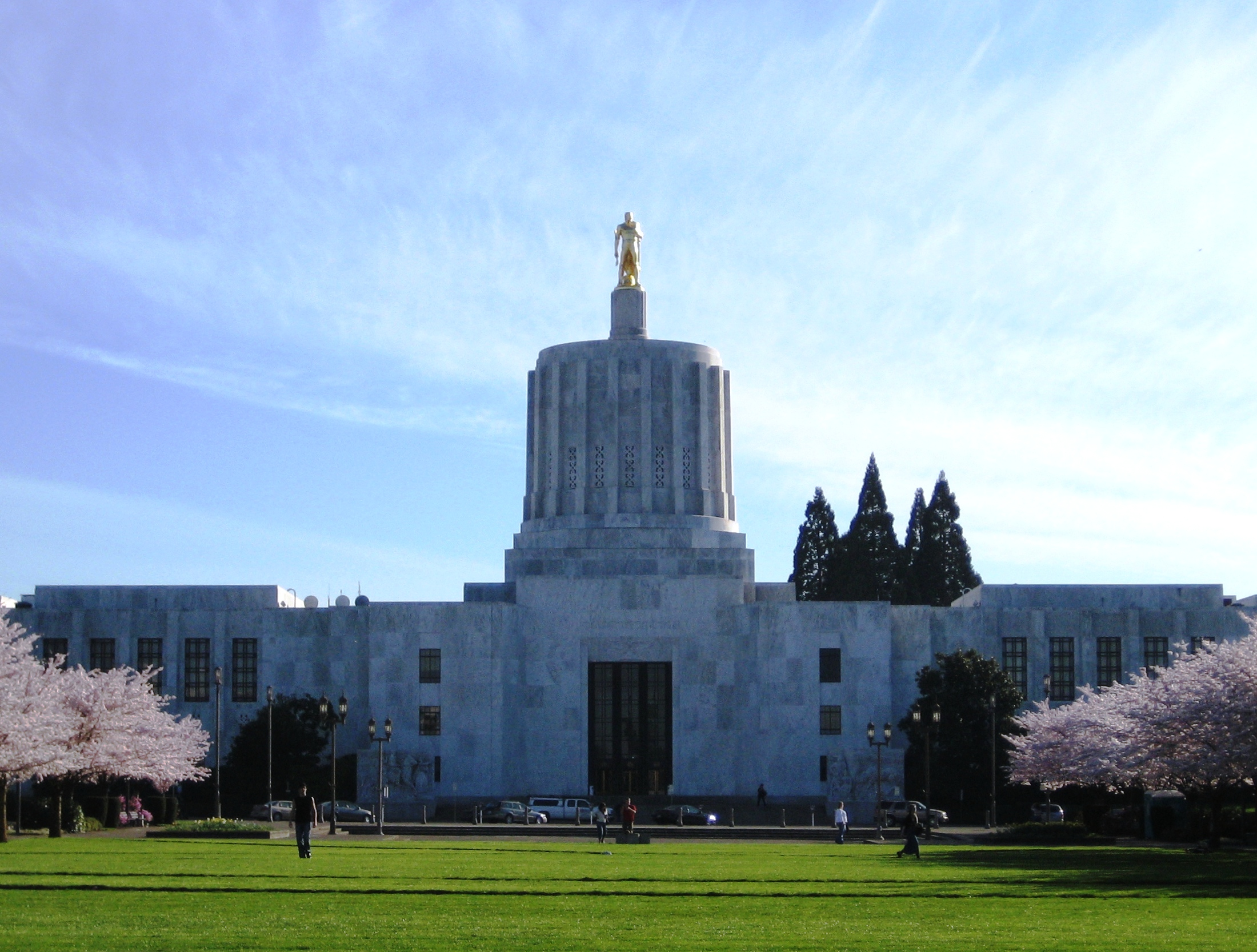
- The legislature took place in the Oregon State Capitol, seen here in 2007

Overview
- Legislative body: Oregon Legislative Assembly
- Jurisdiction: Oregon, United States
- Meeting place: Oregon State Capitol
- Term: 2015–2016
- Website: www.oregonlegislature.gov

Oregon State Senate
- Members: 30 Senators
- Senate President: Peter Courtney (D)
- Majority Leader: Diane Rosenbaum (D)
- Minority Leader: Ted Ferrioli (R)
- Party control: Democratic

Oregon House of Representatives
- Members: 60 Representatives
- Speaker of the House: Tina Kotek (D)
- Majority Leader: Val Hoyle (D)
- Minority Leader: Mike McLane (R)
- Party control: Democratic

The 78th Oregon Legislative Assembly convened beginning on February 2, 2015, for the first of its two regular sessions. All of the 60 seats in the House of Representatives and 14 of the 30 seats in the State Senate were up for election in 2014; the general election for those seats took place on November 4, 2014.

The Democratic Party of Oregon expanded its majority in the Senate to 18–12 and its majority in the House to 35–25. Oregon was the only state where Democrats made net gains in both legislative chambers in the 2014 midterm elections.

== Senate ==
Based on the results of the 2014 elections, the Oregon State Senate is composed of 18 Democrats and 12 Republicans.

== Senate members ==
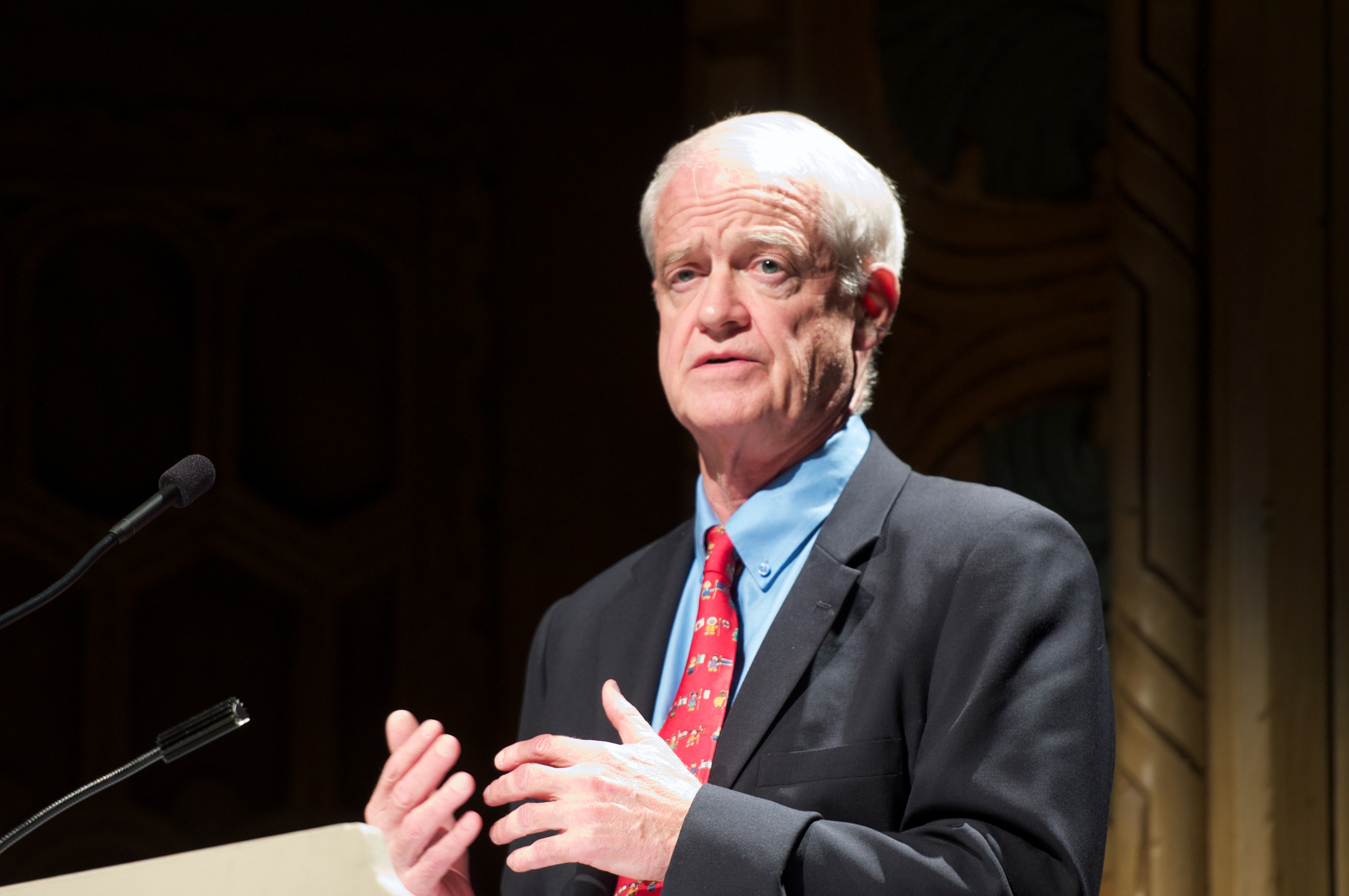
Senate President Peter Courtney

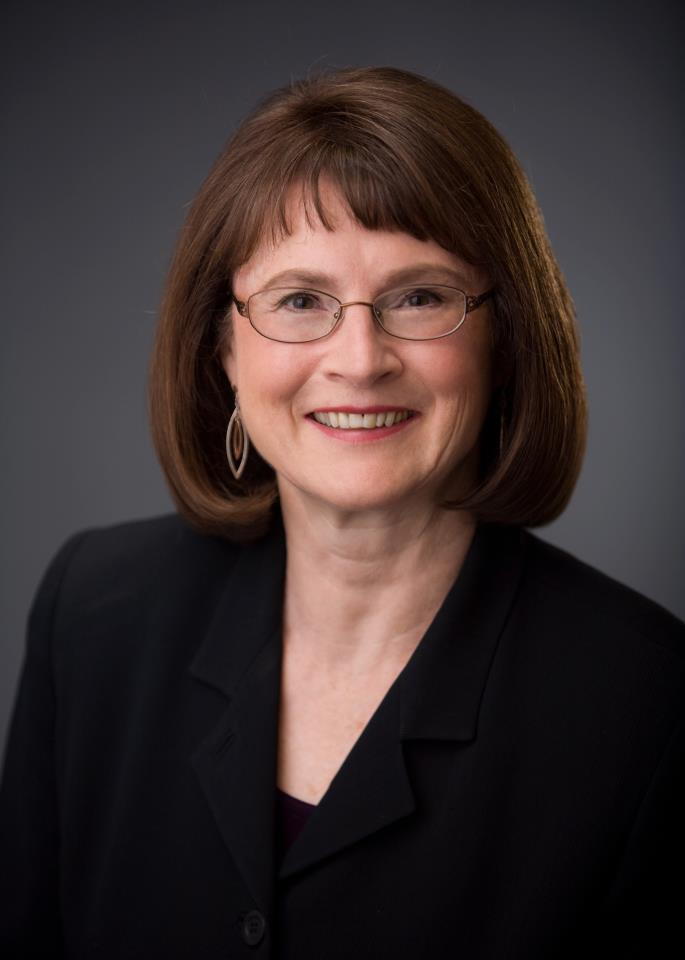
President Pro Tem Ginny Burdick

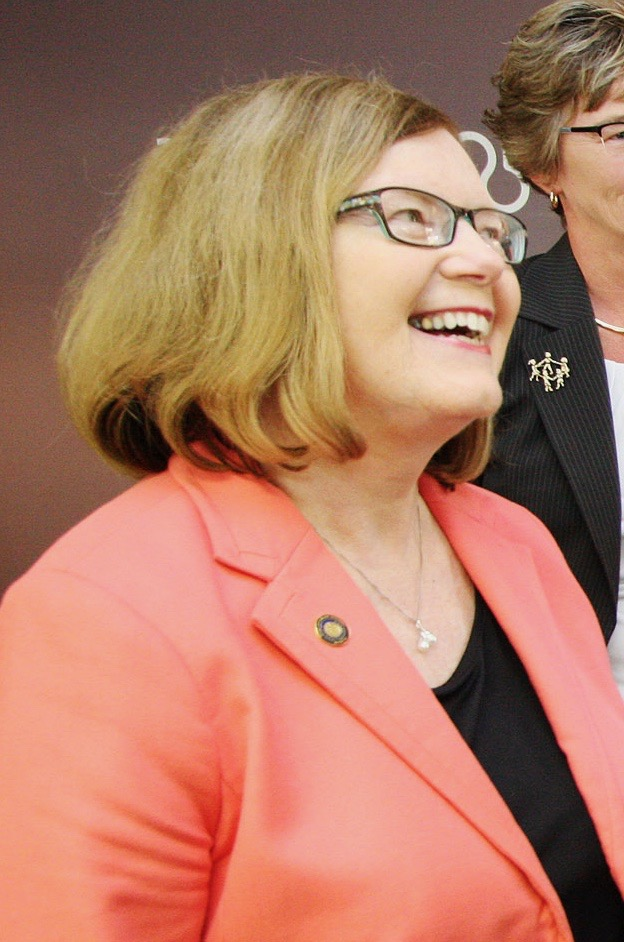
Majority Leader Diane Rosenbaum

The Oregon State Senate is composed of 18 Democrats and 12 Republicans. Democrats picked up Districts 8 and 15 in the 2014 elections for a net gain of two seats.

Senate President: Peter Courtney (D–11 Salem)
President Pro Tem: Ginny Burdick (D–18 Portland)
Majority Leader: Diane Rosenbaum (D–21 Portland)
Minority Leader: Ted Ferrioli (R–30 John Day)

District	Home	Senator	Party
1	Roseburg	Jeff Kruse	Republican
2	Grants Pass	Herman Baertschiger Jr.	Republican
3	Ashland	Alan Bates	Democratic
3	Ashland	Kevin Talbert	Democratic
4	Eugene	Floyd Prozanski	Democratic
5	Coos Bay	Arnie Roblan	Democratic
6	Springfield	Lee Beyer	Democratic
7	Eugene	Chris Edwards	Democratic
7	Eugene	James Manning Jr.	Democratic
8	Corvallis	Sara Gelser	Democratic
9	Molalla	Fred Girod	Republican
10	Salem	Jackie Winters	Republican
11	Salem	Peter Courtney	Democratic
12	McMinnville	Brian Boquist	Republican
13	Keizer	Kim Thatcher	Republican
14	Beaverton	Mark Hass	Democratic
15	Hillsboro	Chuck Riley	Democratic
16	Scappoose	Betsy Johnson	Democratic
17	Portland	Elizabeth Steiner Hayward	Democratic
18	Portland	Ginny Burdick	Democratic
19	Tualatin	Richard Devlin	Democratic
20	Canby	Alan Olsen	Republican
21	Portland	Diane Rosenbaum	Democratic
22	Portland	Chip Shields	Democratic
23	Portland	Michael Dembrow	Democratic
24	Portland	Rod Monroe	Democratic
25	Gresham	Laurie Monnes Anderson	Democratic
26	Hood River	Chuck Thomsen	Republican
27	Bend	Tim Knopp	Republican
28	Klamath Falls	Doug Whitsett	Republican
29	Pendleton	Bill Hansell	Republican
30	John Day	Ted Ferrioli	Republican

== House members ==
Based on the results of the 2014 elections, the Oregon House of Representatives is composed of 35 Democrats and 25 Republicans. Democrats won District 20, which was previously Republican-held, while Republicans picked up no additional seats.

Speaker: Tina Kotek (D–44 Portland)
Majority Leader: Val Hoyle (D–14 Eugene)
Minority Leader: Mike McLane (R–55 Powell Butte)

District	Home	Representative	Party
1	Gold Beach	Wayne Krieger	Republican
2	Roseburg	Dallas Heard	Republican
3	Grants Pass	Carl Wilson	Republican
4	Grants Pass	Duane Stark	Republican
5	Ashland	Peter Buckley	Democratic
6	Medford	Sal Esquivel	Republican
7	Fall Creek	Cedric Ross Hayden	Republican
8	Eugene	Paul Holvey	Democratic
9	Coos Bay	Caddy McKeown	Democratic
10	Otis	David Gomberg	Democratic
11	Eugene	Phil Barnhart	Democratic
12	Springfield	John Lively	Democratic
13	Eugene	Nancy Nathanson	Democratic
14	Eugene	Val Hoyle	Democratic
15	Albany	Andy Olson	Republican
16	Corvallis	Dan Rayfield	Democratic
17	Scio	Sherrie Sprenger	Republican
18	Silverton	Vic Gilliam	Republican
19	Salem	Jodi Hack	Republican
20	Monmouth	Paul Evans	Democratic
21	Salem	Brian L. Clem	Democratic
22	Woodburn	Betty Komp	Democratic
23	Independence	Mike Nearman	Republican
24	McMinnville	Jim Weidner	Republican
25	Keizer	Bill Post	Republican
26	Wilsonville	John Davis	Republican
27	Beaverton	Tobias Read	Democratic
28	Aloha	Jeff Barker	Democratic
29	Forest Grove	Susan McLain	Democratic
30	Hillsboro	Joe Gallegos	Democratic
31	Clatskanie	Brad Witt	Democratic
32	Cannon Beach	Deborah Boone	Democratic
33	Portland	Mitch Greenlick	Democratic
34	Beaverton	Ken Helm	Democratic
35	Tigard	Margaret Doherty	Democratic
36	Portland	Jennifer Williamson	Democratic
37	West Linn	Julie Parrish	Republican
38	Lake Oswego	Ann Lininger	Democratic
39	Oregon City	Bill Kennemer	Republican
40	Gladstone	Brent Barton	Democratic
41	Portland	Kathleen Taylor	Democratic
42	Portland	Rob Nosse	Democratic
43	Portland	Lew Frederick	Democratic
44	Portland	Tina Kotek	Democratic
45	Portland	Barbara Smith Warner	Democratic
46	Portland	Alissa Keny-Guyer	Democratic
47	Portland	Jessica Vega Pederson	Democratic
48	Happy Valley	Jeff Reardon	Democratic
49	Troutdale	Chris Gorsek	Democratic
50	Gresham	Carla Piluso	Democratic
51	Clackamas	Shemia Fagan	Democratic
52	Hood River	Mark Johnson	Republican
53	Sunriver	Gene Whisnant	Republican
54	Bend	Knute Buehler	Republican
55	Powell Butte	Mike McLane	Republican
56	Klamath Falls	Gail Whitsett	Republican
57	Heppner	Greg Smith	Republican
58	Cove	Greg Barreto	Republican
59	The Dalles	John Huffman	Republican
60	Ontario	Cliff Bentz	Republican

== See also ==
- Oregon legislative elections, 2014
