= Senator DeBoer =

Senator DeBoer may refer to:

- Alan DeBoer (born 1950/51), Oregon State Senate
- Wendy DeBoer (born 1974), Nebraska State Senate
