= 2014 Oregon legislative election =

Oregon legislative elections, 2014
- November 4, 2014

16 seats of the Oregon State Senate and 60 seats of the Oregon House of Representatives
	Majority party	Minority party
Party	Democratic	Republican
Seats before	50 (16 in Senate, 34 in House)	40 (14 Senate, 26 House)
Seats after	53 (18 in Senate, 35 in House)	37 (12 Senate, 25 House)
Seat change	▲3 ▲2 in Senate, ▲1 in House	▼3 ▼2 in Senate, ▼1 in House

The 2014 elections for the Oregon Legislative Assembly determined the composition of both houses of the state legislature for the 78th Oregon Legislative Assembly (2015–2016 term). The Republican and Democratic primary elections were held on May 20, 2014 with the general election following on November 4, 2014.

The Democratic Party increased its 16-14 majority in the Senate to a supermajority of 18–12. In the House, the Democrats added one more seat and now holds a 35-25 majority.

== Oregon Senate ==
2014 Oregon State Senate elections
- November 4, 2014

16 of 30 seats in the Oregon State Senate 16 seats needed for a majority
	Majority party	Minority party
Party	Democratic	Republican
Seats before	16	14
Seats after	18	12
Seat change	▲2	▼2
Popular vote	407,044	247,687
Percentage	58.53%	35.62%
Swing	▲7.72%	▼11.04%
- Results of the elections: Democratic gain Democratic hold Republican hold No election

16 of the state senate's 30 seats were up for re-election in 2014. Democrats held a 16–14 majority in the 2012 legislative election.

=== Predictions ===
Source	Ranking	As of
Governing	Lean D	October 20, 2014

=== Open seats ===
- District 13: Republican Larry George retired.

=== Results ===
Oregon State Senate elections, 2014 General election — November 4, 2014
Party	Votes	Percentage	Seats won	Seats contested
Democratic	407,044	58.53%	12	15
Republican	247,687	35.62%	4	11
Libertarian	18,916	2.72%	0	5
Independent	6,603	0.95%	0	1
Constitution	2,426	0.35%	0	1
Green	1,917	0.28%	0	1
Others	10,849	1.56%	0	
Valid votes	695,442	85.23%	—	—
Invalid votes	120,486	14.77%	—	—
Total ballots returned	815,928	100.00%	16	34
Voter turnout	70.73% (Registered Voters)			

The official results are:

District	Party	Incumbent	Status	Party	Candidate	Votes	%
3	Democratic	Alan Bates of Ashland	Re-elected	Democratic	Alan Bates	27,678	51.9%
3	Democratic	Alan Bates of Ashland	Re-elected	Republican	Dave Dotterer	23,700	44.5%
3	Democratic	Alan Bates of Ashland	Re-elected		others	1,917	3.6%
4	Democratic	Floyd Prozanski of S. Lane/N. Douglas counties	Re-elected	Democratic	Floyd Prozanski	30,601	57.8%
4	Democratic	Floyd Prozanski of S. Lane/N. Douglas counties	Re-elected	Republican	Cheryl Mueller	20,119	38.0%
4	Democratic	Floyd Prozanski of S. Lane/N. Douglas counties	Re-elected		others	2,186	4.1%
6	Democratic	Lee Beyer of Springfield	Re-elected	Democratic	Lee Beyer	26,080	58.9%
6	Democratic	Lee Beyer of Springfield	Re-elected	Republican	Michael P. Spasaro	17,999	40.7%
6	Democratic	Lee Beyer of Springfield	Re-elected		others	165	0.4%
7	Democratic	Chris Edwards of Eugene	Re-elected	Democratic	Chris Edwards	30,550	95.0%
7	Democratic	Chris Edwards of Eugene	Re-elected		others	1,607	5.0%
8	Republican	Betsy Close of Albany	Lost election to full term	Republican	Betsy Close	21,922	43.8%
8	Republican	Betsy Close of Albany	Lost election to full term	Democratic	Sara Gelser	27,826	55.7%
8	Republican	Betsy Close of Albany	Lost election to full term		others	250	0.5%
10	Republican	Jackie Winters of Salem	Re-elected	Republican	Jackie Winters	38,129	86.6%
10	Republican	Jackie Winters of Salem	Re-elected		others	5,912	13.4%
11	Democratic	Peter Courtney of Salem	Re-elected	Democratic	Peter Courtney	16,179	54.3%
11	Democratic	Peter Courtney of Salem	Re-elected	Republican	Patricia Milne	13,442	45.1%
11	Democratic	Peter Courtney of Salem	Re-elected		others	178	0.6%
13	Republican	Larry George of Hillsboro	Retiring	Republican	Kim Thatcher	27,638	58.5%
13	Republican	Larry George of Hillsboro	Retiring	Democratic	Ryan Howard	19,434	41.2%
13	Republican	Larry George of Hillsboro	Retiring		others	136	0.3%
15	Republican	Bruce Starr of Hillsboro	Lost re-election	Republican	Bruce Starr	17,689	45.0%
15	Republican	Bruce Starr of Hillsboro	Lost re-election	Democratic	Chuck Riley	18,156	45.7%
15	Republican	Bruce Starr of Hillsboro	Lost re-election		others	3,709	9.3%
16	Democratic	Betsy Johnson of Scappoose	Re-elected	Democratic	Betsy Johnson	34,324	70.0%
16	Democratic	Betsy Johnson of Scappoose	Re-elected		others	14,682	30.0%
17	Democratic	Elizabeth Steiner Hayward of Multnomah County	Elected to full term	Democratic	Elizabeth Steiner Hayward	30,677	65.9%
17	Democratic	Elizabeth Steiner Hayward of Multnomah County	Elected to full term	Republican	John Verbeek	15,697	33.7%
17	Democratic	Elizabeth Steiner Hayward of Multnomah County	Elected to full term		others	201	0.4%
19	Democratic	Richard Devlin of Tualatin	Re-elected	Democratic	Richard Devlin	39,529	96.0%
19	Democratic	Richard Devlin of Tualatin	Re-elected		others	1,626	4.0%
20	Republican	Alan Olsen of Canby	Re-elected	Republican	Alan Olsen	26,750	52.6%
20	Republican	Alan Olsen of Canby	Re-elected	Democratic	Jamie Damon	23,930	47.0%
20	Republican	Alan Olsen of Canby	Re-elected		others	199	0.4%
23	Democratic	Michael Dembrow of Portland	Elected to full term	Democratic	Michael Dembrow	40,948	86.3%
23	Democratic	Michael Dembrow of Portland	Elected to full term		others	6,516	13.7%
24	Democratic	Rod Monroe of Portland	Re-elected	Democratic	Rod Monroe	22,491	95.1%
24	Democratic	Rod Monroe of Portland	Re-elected		others	1,155	4.9%
26	Republican	Chuck Thomsen of Hood River	Re-elected	Republican	Chuck Thomsen	24,422	56.5%
26	Republican	Chuck Thomsen of Hood River	Re-elected	Democratic	Robert R. Bruce	18,641	43.1%
26	Republican	Chuck Thomsen of Hood River	Re-elected		others	183	0.4%

== Oregon House of Representatives ==
2014 Oregon House of Representatives elections
- November 4, 2014

60 seats of the Oregon House of Representatives 31 seats needed for a majority
	Majority party	Minority party
Party	Democratic	Republican
Seats before	34	26
Seats after	35	25
Seat change	▲1	▼1
Popular vote	659,903	572,673
Percentage	50.9%	44.2%
- Results: Democratic gain Democratic hold Republican hold

All 60 seats in the State House of Representatives were up for re-election in 2014. Democrats took a 34-26 majority in the 2012 elections after they picked up a net of four seats.

=== Predictions ===
Source	Ranking	As of
Governing	Likely D	October 20, 2014

=== Open seats ===
- District 2: Republican Tim Freeman was elected to the Douglas County Board of Commissioners.
- District 3: Republican Wally Hicks retired.
- District 4: Republican Dennis Richardson is the Republican nominee for Governor of Oregon.
- District 7: Republican Bruce Hanna retired.
- District 16: Democrat Sara Gelser was the Democratic nominee for state Senate in District 8.
- District 19: Republican Kevin Cameron resigned when he was appointed to the Marion County Board of Commissioners
- District 20: Republican Vicki Berger retired.
- District 23: Republican Jim Thompson was defeated in the primary by Mike Nearman.
- District 25: Republican Kim Thatcher was the Republican nominee for state Senate in District 13.
- District 29: Democrat Ben Unger retired.
- District 34: Democrat Chris Harker retired.
- District 41: Democrat Carolyn Tomei retired.
- District 42: Democrat Jules Bailey was elected to the Multnomah County Board of Commissioners.
- District 50: Democrat Greg Matthews retired.
- District 54: Republican Jason Conger ran for the Republican nomination for U.S. Senator from Oregon.
- District 58: Republican Bob Jenson retired.

=== Results ===
District	Party	Incumbent	Status	Party	Candidate	Votes	%
1	Republican	Wayne Krieger of Gold Beach	Re-elected	Republican	Wayne Krieger	18,891	69.9%
1	Republican	Wayne Krieger of Gold Beach	Re-elected	Democratic	Jim Klahr	8,004	29.6%
1	Republican	Wayne Krieger of Gold Beach	Re-elected		others	117	0.4%
2	Republican	Tim Freeman of Roseburg	Retiring	Republican	Dallas Heard	13,337	62.7%
2	Republican	Tim Freeman of Roseburg	Retiring	Democratic	Kerry Atherton	6,676	31.4%
2	Republican	Tim Freeman of Roseburg	Retiring		others	1,271	6.0%
3	Republican	Wally Hicks of Grants Pass	Retiring	Republican	Carl Wilson	15,765	64.1%
3	Republican	Wally Hicks of Grants Pass	Retiring	Democratic	Tom Johnson	6,478	26.4%
3	Republican	Wally Hicks of Grants Pass	Retiring		others	2,339	9.5%
4	Republican	Dennis Richardson of Central Point	Retiring	Republican	Duane Stark	15,571	68.5%
4	Republican	Dennis Richardson of Central Point	Retiring	Democratic	Darlene Taylor	7,063	31.1%
4	Republican	Dennis Richardson of Central Point	Retiring		others	87	0.4%
5	Democratic	Peter Buckley of Ashland	Re-elected	Democratic	Peter Buckley	18,942	64.1%
5	Democratic	Peter Buckley of Ashland	Re-elected	Republican	Nick Card	10,557	35.7%
5	Democratic	Peter Buckley of Ashland	Re-elected		others	52	0.2%
6	Republican	Sal Esquivel of Medford	Re-elected	Republican	Sal Esquivel	15,329	95.9%
6	Republican	Sal Esquivel of Medford	Re-elected		others	661	4.1%
7	Republican	Bruce Hanna of Roseburg	Retiring	Republican	Cedric Ross Hayden	16,725	79.7%
7	Republican	Bruce Hanna of Roseburg	Retiring		others	4,261	20.3%
8	Democratic	Paul Holvey of Eugene	Re-elected	Democratic	Paul Holvey	19,202	96.6%
8	Democratic	Paul Holvey of Eugene	Re-elected		others	674	3.4%
9	Democratic	Caddy McKeown of Coos Bay	Re-elected	Democratic	Caddy McKeown	13,746	57.7%
9	Democratic	Caddy McKeown of Coos Bay	Re-elected	Republican	Casey Runyan	8,983	37.7%
9	Democratic	Caddy McKeown of Coos Bay	Re-elected		others	1,099	4.6%
10	Democratic	David Gomberg of Newport	Re-elected	Democratic	David Gomberg	16,681	96.9%
10	Democratic	David Gomberg of Newport	Re-elected		others	545	3.1%
11	Democratic	Phil Barnhart of Eugene	Re-elected	Democratic	Phil Barnhart	13,522	52.6%
11	Democratic	Phil Barnhart of Eugene	Re-elected	Republican	Andy Petersen	12,090	47.1%
11	Democratic	Phil Barnhart of Eugene	Re-elected		others	77	0.3%
12	Democratic	John Lively of Springfield	Re-elected	Democratic	John Lively	12,445	64.3%
12	Democratic	John Lively of Springfield	Re-elected	Republican	Christopher P. Gergen	6,823	35.3%
12	Democratic	John Lively of Springfield	Re-elected		others	78	0.4%
13	Democratic	Nancy Nathanson of Eugene	Re-elected	Democratic	Nancy Nathanson	16,854	69.2%
13	Democratic	Nancy Nathanson of Eugene	Re-elected	Republican	Laura D. Cooper	7,408	30,4%
13	Democratic	Nancy Nathanson of Eugene	Re-elected		others	104	0.4%
14	Democratic	Val Hoyle of Eugene	Re-elected	Democratic	Val Hoyle	12,370	55.6%
14	Democratic	Val Hoyle of Eugene	Re-elected	Republican	Kathy Lamberg	9,769	43.9%
14	Democratic	Val Hoyle of Eugene	Re-elected		others	94	0.4%
15	Republican	Andy Olson of Albany	Re-elected	Republican	Andy Olson	19,048	97.7%
15	Republican	Andy Olson of Albany	Re-elected		others	451	2.3%
16	Democratic	Sara Gelser of Corvallis	Retiring	Democratic	Dan Rayfield	16,797	72.1%
16	Democratic	Sara Gelser of Corvallis	Retiring	Republican	Jacob D. Vandever	6,379	27.4%
16	Democratic	Sara Gelser of Corvallis	Retiring		others	113	0.5%
17	Republican	Sherrie Sprenger of Scio	Re-elected	Republican	Sherrie Sprenger	16,683	73.7%
17	Republican	Sherrie Sprenger of Scio	Re-elected	Democratic	Rich Harisay	5,845	25.8%
17	Republican	Sherrie Sprenger of Scio	Re-elected		others	113	0.5%
18	Republican	Vic Gilliam of Silverton	Re-elected	Republican	Vic Gilliam	15,129	65.6%
18	Republican	Vic Gilliam of Silverton	Re-elected	Democratic	Scott A. Mills	7,801	33.8%
18	Republican	Vic Gilliam of Silverton	Re-elected		others	123	0.5%
19	Republican	Kevin Cameron of Salem	Retiring	Republican	Jodi L. Hack	12,664	57.0%
19	Republican	Kevin Cameron of Salem	Retiring	Democratic	Bill Dalton	9,522	42.8%
19	Republican	Kevin Cameron of Salem	Retiring		others	50	0.2%
20	Republican	Vicki Berger of Salem	Retiring	Republican	Kathy B. Goss	11,656	48.1%
20	Republican	Vicki Berger of Salem	Retiring	Democratic	Paul Evans	12,400	51.2%
20	Republican	Vicki Berger of Salem	Retiring		others	165	0.7%
21	Democratic	Brian Clem of Salem	Re-elected	Democratic	Brian Clem	10,527	63.7%
21	Democratic	Brian Clem of Salem	Re-elected	Republican	Beverly J. Wright	5,865	35.5%
21	Democratic	Brian Clem of Salem	Re-elected		others	121	0.7%
22	Democratic	Betty Komp of Woodburn	Re-elected	Democratic	Betty Komp	6,523	52.5%
22	Democratic	Betty Komp of Woodburn	Re-elected	Republican	Matt Geiger	5,329	42.9%
22	Democratic	Betty Komp of Woodburn	Re-elected		others	583	4.7%
23	Republican	Jim Thompson of Dallas	Lost in primary	Republican	Mike Nearman	14,474	52.8%
23	Republican	Jim Thompson of Dallas	Lost in primary	Democratic	Wanda Davis	9,891	36.1%
23	Republican	Jim Thompson of Dallas	Lost in primary		others	3,066	11.2%
24	Republican	Jim Weidner of Yamhill	Re-elected	Republican	Jim Weidner	12,083	51.1%
24	Republican	Jim Weidner of Yamhill	Re-elected	Democratic	Ken Moore	10,845	45.9%
24	Republican	Jim Weidner of Yamhill	Re-elected		others	708	3.0%
25	Republican	Kim Thatcher of Keizer	Retiring	Republican	Bill Post	12,555	54.8%
25	Republican	Kim Thatcher of Keizer	Retiring	Independent Party (US)	Chuck Lee	9,574	43.3%
25	Republican	Kim Thatcher of Keizer	Retiring		others	765	1.9%
26	Republican	John Davis of Wilsonville	Re-elected	Republican	John Davis	13,546	57,8%
26	Republican	John Davis of Wilsonville	Re-elected	Democratic	Eric D. Squires	8,811	37.6%
26	Republican	John Davis of Wilsonville	Re-elected		others	1,059	4.5%
27	Democratic	Tobias Read of Beaverton	Re-elected	Democratic	Tobias Read	17,621	80.8%
27	Democratic	Tobias Read of Beaverton	Re-elected		others	4,178	19.2%
28	Democratic	Jeff Barker of Aloha	Re-elected	Democratic	Jeff Barker	14,582	80.7%
28	Democratic	Jeff Barker of Aloha	Re-elected		others	3,495	19.3%
29	Democratic	Ben Unger of Hillsboro	Retiring	Democratic	Susan McLain	9,751	53.7%
29	Democratic	Ben Unger of Hillsboro	Retiring	Republican	Mark Richman	8,321	45.9%
29	Democratic	Ben Unger of Hillsboro	Retiring		others	73	0.4%
30	Democratic	Joe Gallegos of Hillsboro	Re-elected	Democratic	Joe Gallegos	10,426	50.0%
30	Democratic	Joe Gallegos of Hillsboro	Re-elected	Republican	Dan Mason	8,518	40.8%
30	Democratic	Joe Gallegos of Hillsboro	Re-elected		others	1,910	9.2%
31	Democratic	Brad Witt of Clatskanie	Re-elected	Democratic	Brad Witt	13,633	54.4%
31	Democratic	Brad Witt of Clatskanie	Re-elected	Republican	Larry Ericksen	10,224	40.8%
31	Democratic	Brad Witt of Clatskanie	Re-elected		others	1,192	4.7%
32	Democratic	Deborah Boone of Cannon Beach	Re-elected	Democratic	Deborah Boone	14,831	60.2%
32	Democratic	Deborah Boone of Cannon Beach	Re-elected	Republican	Rick Rose	9,677	39.3%
32	Democratic	Deborah Boone of Cannon Beach	Re-elected		others	119	0.5%
33	Democratic	Mitch Greenlick of Portland	Re-elected	Democratic	Mitch Greenlick	19,413	81.7%
33	Democratic	Mitch Greenlick of Portland	Re-elected		others	4,353	18.3%
34	Democratic	Chris Harker of Beaverton	Retiring	Democratic	Ken Helm	13,475	66.1%
34	Democratic	Chris Harker of Beaverton	Retiring	Republican	Brenden King	6,807	33.4%
34	Democratic	Chris Harker of Beaverton	Retiring		others	108	0.5%
35	Democratic	Margaret Doherty of Tigard	Re-elected	Democratic	Margaret Doherty	18,334	81.1%
35	Democratic	Margaret Doherty of Tigard	Re-elected		others	4,263	18.3%
36	Democratic	Jennifer Williamson of Portland	Re-elected	Democratic	Jennifer Williamson	21,626	85.0%
36	Democratic	Jennifer Williamson of Portland	Re-elected		others	3,804	15.0%
37	Republican	Julie Parrish of West Linn	Re-elected	Republican	Julie Parrish	14,828	56.4%
37	Republican	Julie Parrish of West Linn	Re-elected	Democratic	Gerritt Rosenthal	11,365	43.3%
37	Republican	Julie Parrish of West Linn	Re-elected		others	78	0.3%
38	Democratic	Ann Lininger of Lake Oswego	Elected to full term	Democratic	Ann Lininger	20,405	96.4%
38	Democratic	Ann Lininger of Lake Oswego	Elected to full term		others	757	3.6%
39	Republican	Bill Kennemer of Oregon City	Re-elected	Republican	Bill Kennemer	20,041	96.7%
39	Republican	Bill Kennemer of Oregon City	Re-elected		others	689	3.3%
40	Democratic	Brent Barton of Gladstone	Re-elected	Democratic	Brent Barton	12,994	53.7%
40	Democratic	Brent Barton of Gladstone	Re-elected	Republican	Steve Newgard	11,059	45.7%
40	Democratic	Brent Barton of Gladstone	Re-elected		others	126	0.5%
41	Democratic	Carolyn Tomei of Milwaukie	Retiring	Democratic	Kathleen Taylor	18,845	70.5%
41	Democratic	Carolyn Tomei of Milwaukie	Retiring	Republican	Timothy E. McMenamin	7,774	29.5%
41	Democratic	Carolyn Tomei of Milwaukie	Retiring		others	117	0.4%
42	Democratic	Rob Nosse of Portland	Elected to a full term	Democratic	Rob Nosse	26,321	90.6%
42	Democratic	Rob Nosse of Portland	Elected to a full term		others	2,718	9.4%
43	Democratic	Lew Frederick of Portland	Re-elected	Democratic	Lew Frederick	21,553	97.5%
43	Democratic	Lew Frederick of Portland	Re-elected		others	561	2.5%
44	Democratic	Tina Kotek of Portland	Re-elected	Democratic	Tina Kotek	19,760	85.5%
44	Democratic	Tina Kotek of Portland	Re-elected	Republican	Michael Harrington	3,151	13.6%
44	Democratic	Tina Kotek of Portland	Re-elected		others	193	0.8%
45	Democratic	Barbara Smith Warner of Portland	Elected to full term	Democratic	Barbara Smith Warner	18,707	96.9%
45	Democratic	Barbara Smith Warner of Portland	Elected to full term		others	604	3.1%
46	Democratic	Alissa Keny-Guyer of Portland	Re-elected	Democratic	Alissa Keny-Guyer	17,930	96.8%
46	Democratic	Alissa Keny-Guyer of Portland	Re-elected		others	598	3.2%
47	Democratic	Jessica Vega Pederson of Portland	Re-elected	Democratic	Jessica Vega Pederson	10,379	95.4%
47	Democratic	Jessica Vega Pederson of Portland	Re-elected		others	505	4.6%
48	Democratic	Jeff Reardon of Happy Valley	Re-elected	Democratic	Jeff Reardon	10,738	67.2%
48	Democratic	Jeff Reardon of Happy Valley	Re-elected	Republican	George (Sonny) Yellott	5,101	31.9%
48	Democratic	Jeff Reardon of Happy Valley	Re-elected		others	142	0.9%
49	Democratic	Chris Gorsek of Troutdale	Re-elected	Democratic	Chris Gorsek	9,527	60.4%
49	Democratic	Chris Gorsek of Troutdale	Re-elected	Republican	Bill Beckers	6,141	38.9%
49	Democratic	Chris Gorsek of Troutdale	Re-elected		others	107	0.7%
50	Democratic	Greg Matthews of Gresham	Retiring	Democratic	Carla Piluso	9,613	54.8%
50	Democratic	Greg Matthews of Gresham	Retiring	Republican	Dan Chriestenson	7,847	44.7%
50	Democratic	Greg Matthews of Gresham	Retiring		others	97	0.6%
51	Democratic	Shemia Fagan of Clackamas	Re-elected	Democratic	Shemia Fagan	10,518	52.4%
51	Democratic	Shemia Fagan of Clackamas	Re-elected	Republican	Jodi Bailey	9,450	47.1%
51	Democratic	Shemia Fagan of Clackamas	Re-elected		others	96	0.5%
52	Republican	Mark Johnson of Hood River	Re-elected	Republican	Mark Johnson	13,014	54.4%
52	Republican	Mark Johnson of Hood River	Re-elected	Democratic	Stephanie Nystrom	10,839	45.3%
52	Republican	Mark Johnson of Hood River	Re-elected		others	72	0.3%
53	Republican	Gene Whisnant of Sunriver	Re-elected	Republican	Gene Whisnant	20,173	97.7%
53	Republican	Gene Whisnant of Sunriver	Re-elected		others	482	2.3%
54	Republican	Jason Conger of Bend	Retiring	Republican	Knute Buehler	15,348	58.2%
54	Republican	Jason Conger of Bend	Retiring	Democratic	Craig Wilhelm	10,876	41.3%
54	Republican	Jason Conger of Bend	Retiring		others	134	0.5%
55	Republican	Mike McLane of Powell Butte	Re-elected	Republican	Mike McLane	17,689	72.4%
55	Republican	Mike McLane of Powell Butte	Re-elected	Democratic	Richard Phay	5,369	22.0%
55	Republican	Mike McLane of Powell Butte	Re-elected		others	1,380	5.6%
56	Republican	Gail Whitsett of Klamath Falls	Re-elected	Republican	Gail Whitsett	16,252	97.2%
56	Republican	Gail Whitsett of Klamath Falls	Re-elected		others	462	2.8%
57	Republican	Greg Smith of Heppner	Re-elected	Republican	Greg Smith	12,637	98.3%
57	Republican	Greg Smith of Heppner	Re-elected		others	223	1.7%
58	Republican	Bob Jenson of Pendleton	Retiring	Republican	Greg Barreto	16,728	73.2%
58	Republican	Bob Jenson of Pendleton	Retiring	Democratic	Heidi Van Schoonhoven	5,667	24.8%
58	Republican	Bob Jenson of Pendleton	Retiring		others	461	2.0%
59	Republican	John Huffman of The Dalles	Re-elected	Republican	John Huffman	18,325	98.1%
59	Republican	John Huffman of The Dalles	Re-elected		others	347	1.9%
60	Republican	Cliff Bentz of Ontario	Re-elected	Republican	Cliff Bentz	16,909	82.0%
60	Republican	Cliff Bentz of Ontario	Re-elected	Democratic	Peter W. Hall	3,662	17.8%
60	Republican	Cliff Bentz of Ontario	Re-elected		others	53	0.3%

== See also ==
- 77th Oregon Legislative Assembly (2013–2014)
- 78th Oregon Legislative Assembly (2015–2016)
