= Alan Bates (politician) =

American politician

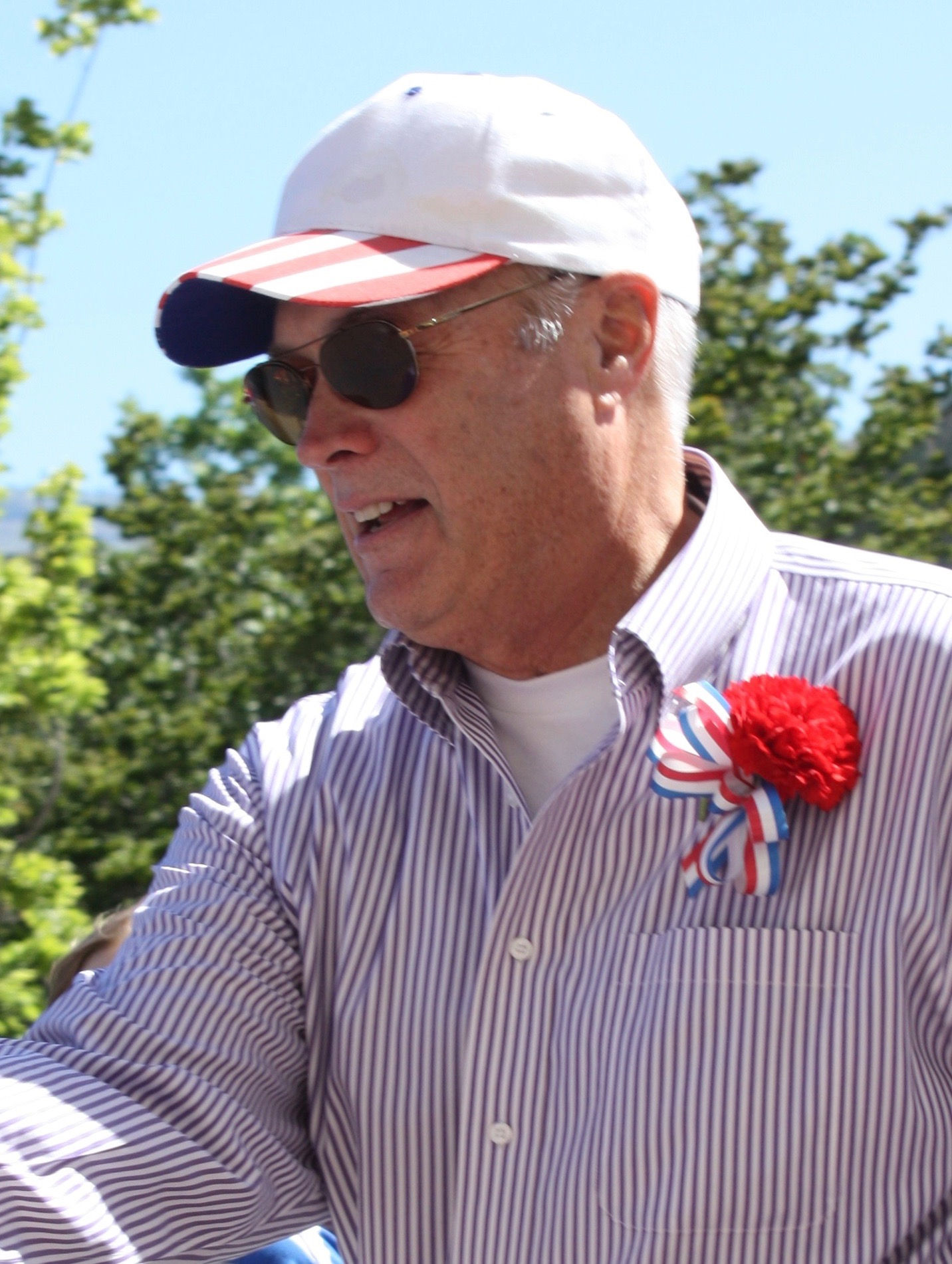

Member of the Oregon State Senate from the 3rd district
- In office January 2005 – August 5, 2016
- Succeeded by: Kevin Talbert

Member of the Oregon House of Representatives
- In office January 2001 – January 2005
- Succeeded by: Peter J. Buckley

Personal details
- Born: Alan Curtis Bates; March 17, 1945 Seattle, Washington
- Died: August 5, 2016 (aged 71) Rogue River, Oregon, U.S.
- Party: Democratic
- Spouse: Laurie
- Children: Kim Bates, Krista Bates, Keri Bates, Curtis Bates, Samantha Bates Tipler
- Education: Central Washington University; Kansas City University
- Occupation: Doctor of Osteopathic Medicine

Alan Curtis Bates (March 17, 1945 – August 5, 2016) was an American osteopathic physician and a Democratic politician from the U.S. state of Oregon. He was a member of the Oregon State Senate, representing the 3rd District since 2005. Previously he was a member of the Oregon House of Representatives from 2000 through 2004.

== Biography ==
Alan C. Bates was born March 17, 1945. Bates graduated with a bachelor's degree from Central Washington University. Bates served in the United States Army from 1965 to 1967. In 1977, he graduated from Kansas City University with a Doctor of Osteopathic Medicine degree. From 2000 to 2004, Bates served in the Oregon House of Representatives. From 2005 to 2016, Bates served in the Oregon State Senate. Bates was instrumental in implementing the Oregon Health Plan, a statewide insurance plan designed to cover low-income residents during the first tenure of Governor John Kitzhaber.

Bates died of a myocardial infarction (heart attack) on August 5, 2016, while fly fishing with his son on the Rogue River.

== See also ==
- 78th Oregon Legislative Assembly
- 77th Oregon Legislative Assembly
- 76th Oregon Legislative Assembly
- 75th Oregon Legislative Assembly
- 74th Oregon Legislative Assembly
- 73rd Oregon Legislative Assembly

== Electoral history ==
2004 Oregon State Senator, 3rd district
Party	Candidate	Votes	%
Democratic	Alan C. Bates	32,563	51.9
Republican	Jim Wright	30,101	48.0
Write-in		62	0.1
Total votes		62,726	100%

2006 Oregon State Senator, 3rd district
Party	Candidate	Votes	%
Democratic	Alan Bates	30,552	63.7
Republican	Lynn Aiello	17,321	36.1
Write-in		92	0.2
Total votes		47,965	100%

2010 Oregon State Senator, 3rd district
Party	Candidate	Votes	%
Democratic	Alan Bates	24,550	50.2
Republican	Dave Dotterrer	24,275	49.7
Write-in		59	0.1
Total votes		48,884	100%

2014 Oregon State Senator, 3rd district
Party	Candidate	Votes	%
Democratic	Alan Bates	27,678	51.9
Republican	Dave Dotterrer	23,700	44.4
Pacific Green	Art H Krueger	1,917	3.6
Write-in		69	0.1
Total votes		53,364	100%
