= Carla Piluso =

American politician

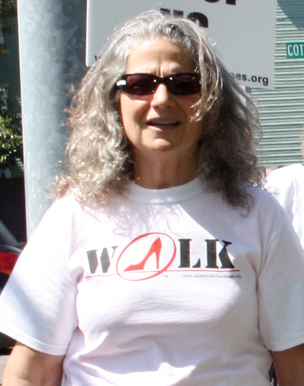

Member of the Oregon House of Representatives from the 50th district
- In office January 12, 2015 – January 11, 2021
- Preceded by: Greg Matthews
- Succeeded by: Ricki Ruiz

Personal details
- Born: 1955 or 1956 (age 70–71)
- Party: Democratic
- Education: Willamette University
- Profession: police chief, politician
- Carla Piluso's voice Piluso talks in a debate before the 2014 Oregon House of Representatives election Recorded October 17, 2014

Carla Piluso (born 1955/56) is an American politician and former police officer. She was the first woman to serve as chief of the Gresham Police Department in Gresham, Oregon. In 2014, she won election as a Democrat to the Oregon House of Representatives, representing District 50. Piluso served in the Gresham Police Department for 30 years, beginning in 1979. She is also on the school board for the Gresham-Barlow School District. She was an unsuccessful candidate for Multnomah County commissioner in 2008.

== Personal life ==
Piluso grew up in Multnomah County. She is an alumna of Willamette University in Salem. She has a daughter, Kate. According to her campaign website, she was the first woman to hold every rank at the Gresham Police Department, including the position of chief of police.

== Electoral history ==
2014 Oregon State Representative, 50th district
| Party | Candidate | Votes | % |
|---|---|---|---|
| Democratic | Carla C Piluso | 9,613 | 54.8 |
| Republican | Dan Chriestenson | 7,847 | 44.7 |
| Write-in | | 97 | 0.6 |
| Total votes | | 17,557 | 100% |

2016 Oregon State Representative, 50th district
| Party | Candidate | Votes | % |
|---|---|---|---|
| Democratic | Carla Piluso | 11,840 | 50.3 |
| Republican | Stella Armstrong | 7,254 | 30.8 |
| Independent | Michael Calcagno | 4,433 | 18.8 |
| Write-in | | 33 | 0.1 |
| Total votes | | 23,560 | 100% |

2018 Oregon State Representative, 50th district
| Party | Candidate | Votes | % |
|---|---|---|---|
| Democratic | Carla C Piluso | 14,595 | 93.8 |
| Write-in | | 960 | 6.2 |
| Total votes | | 15,555 | 100% |
