= Duane Stark =

American politician

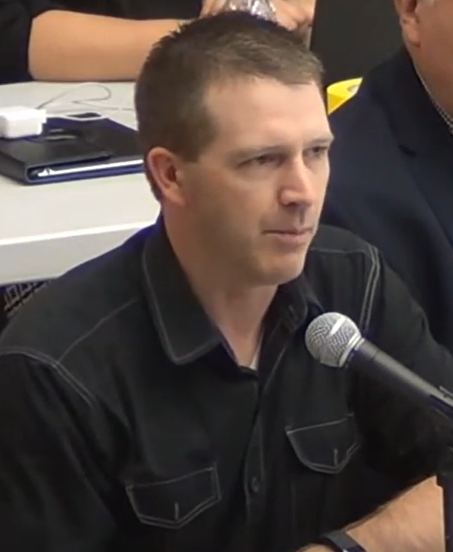
- Stark in 2015

Member of the Oregon House of Representatives from the 4th district
- In office January 12, 2015 – January 9, 2023
- Preceded by: Dennis Richardson
- Succeeded by: Christine Goodwin

Personal details
- Party: Republican
- Education: Multnomah University (M.A.); University of Oregon (B.A.)
- Profession: Politician, pastor, community advocate

Duane Stark is an American politician. A member of the Republican Party from southern Oregon, he was elected to succeed his party's 2014 gubernatorial nominee, Dennis Richardson, in the Oregon House of Representatives from District 4. He took office in January 2015 as one of two new state representatives from Grants Pass, together with Carl Wilson.

== Personal life ==
Stark lives in Grants Pass with his wife Dusti and their five children. He holds degrees from the University of Oregon and Multnomah University. He is a pastor at River Valley Church in Grants Pass. He also has a background in nonprofit work.

== Electoral history ==
2014 Oregon State Representative, 4th district
Party	Candidate	Votes	%
Republican	Duane A Stark	15,571	68.5
Democratic	Darlene V Taylor	7,063	31.1
Write-in		87	0.4
Total votes		22,721	100%

2016 Oregon State Representative, 4th district
Party	Candidate	Votes	%
Republican	Duane A Stark	21,975	98.3
Write-in		380	1.7
Total votes		22,355	100%

2018 Oregon State Representative, 4th district
Party	Candidate	Votes	%
Republican	Duane A Stark	20,751	98.1
Write-in		403	1.9
Total votes		21,154	100%

2020 Oregon State Representative, 4th district
Party	Candidate	Votes	%
Republican	Duane A Stark	26,199	68.9
Democratic	Mary Middleton	11,757	30.9
Write-in		58	0.2
Total votes		38,014	100%
