= Kevin Talbert =

American Democratic politician who formerly served in the Oregon Senate

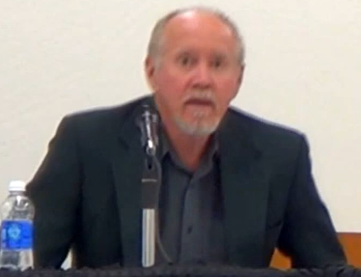
- Talbert in 2014

Member of the Oregon State Senate from the 3rd district
- In office August 30, 2016 – January 9, 2017
- Preceded by: Alan Bates
- Succeeded by: Alan DeBoer

Personal details
- Party: Democratic

Kevin Talbert is an American Democratic politician who formerly served in the Oregon Senate. After the death of Senator Alan Bates, he was unanimously selected by the Jackson County Board of Commissioners on August 30, 2016 to fill Bates' seat. He did not run in the 2016 general election.

Talbert served on the General Services Committee and Veteran's Service Committee.

Talbert unsuccessfully ran for Jackson County Commissioner in 2014.
