= Alan DeBoer =

American businessman and politician

Member of the Oregon State Senate from the 3rd district
- In office January 9, 2017 – January 14, 2019
- Preceded by: Kevin Talbert
- Succeeded by: Jeff Golden

Mayor of Ashland, Oregon
- In office 2001–2004
- Preceded by: Catherine Golden
- Succeeded by: John Morrison

Personal details
- Born: 1950 or 1951 (age 75–76)
- Party: Republican
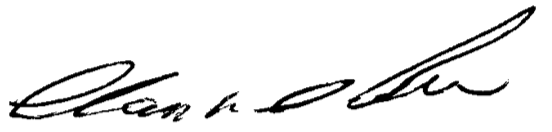
- Signature

Alan W. DeBoer (born 1950/51) is an American businessman and Republican politician. He served as mayor of Ashland, Oregon from 2001 until 2004, and also served on the Ashland City Council and School Board.

== Political career ==
DeBoer ran for the Oregon House of Representatives in 2016, however was nominated by the Republican Party as their candidate for the seat vacated by the death of State Senator Alan Bates in August 2016. He was elected to the Oregon State Senate in November 2016, defeating Democrat Tonia Moro by about 500 votes.

In a debate in October 2016, DeBoer stated his opposition to Oregon Ballot Measure 97.

In February 2018, DeBoer announced that he would retire from the State Senate and not seek re-election to another term.

== 2017 legislative session ==
During the 2017 Legislative Session, Alan DeBoer served on the Senate Committee on General Government and Accountability as the Vice-Chair, The Joint Committee on Information Management and Technology, The Joint Ways and Means Subcommittee on General Government, and the Joint Ways and Means Committee. DeBoer chief-sponsored two pieces of legislation during the 2017 session, one a memorial to former Senator Alan Bates, the second to repeal the Oregon Income Tax kicker refund. Alan DeBoer voted with his Republican colleagues 94% of the time and missed 30 votes. DeBoer voted against the comprehensive women's health equity bill that provided increased access to reproductive health services in Oregon. During the 2017 session, DeBoer was a vocal opponent of House Bill 2004 which aimed at providing renter protections including banning no-cause evictions and local rent control.
