= Margaret Doherty =

American politician

Member of the Oregon House of Representatives from the 35th district
- In office September 21, 2009 – January 11, 2021
- Preceded by: Larry Galizio
- Succeeded by: Dacia Grayber

Personal details
- Born: c. 1951 (age 74–75)
- Party: Democratic
- Education: Portland State University; Lewis & Clark College
- Website: margaretdoherty.com

Margaret Doherty (born c. 1951) is an American politician and a Democratic member of the Oregon House of Representatives representing district 35 from her September 2009 appointment by Multnomah and Washington County Commissioners to fill the vacancy caused by the resignation of Larry Galizio until January 2021. In addition to teaching at Milwaukie High School, she worked as a consultant for the Oregon Education Association and had a florist business out of her house in Tigard. In Tigard she volunteered at the library and served on the city's planning commission.

== Education ==
Doherty graduated from Portland State University and earned her master's degree from Lewis & Clark College.

== Elections ==
- 2012: Doherty was unopposed for both the May 15, 2012, Democratic primary, winning with 4,668 votes, and won the November 6, 2012, general election, winning with 17,593 votes (59.8%) against Republican nominee John Goodhouse.
- 2010: Doherty was unopposed for the May 18, 2010, Democratic primary, winning with 4,475 votes, and won the November 2, 2010, general election with 12,991 votes (56.7%) against Republican nominee Russell Fiddes.
