= Powell Butte, Oregon =

Unincorporated community in the state of Oregon, United States

- Unincorporated community
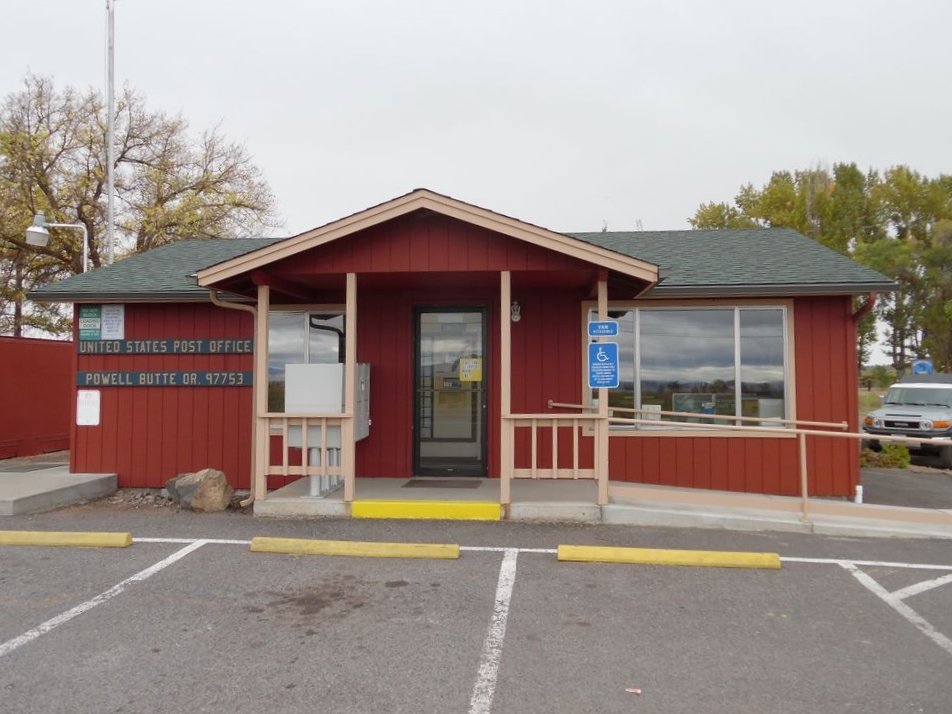
- Powell Butte post office

- Location in Oregon Powell Butte (the United States)
- Coordinates: 44.24762°N 121.01753°W
- Country: United States
- State: Oregon
- County: Crook
- Elevation: 3,117 ft (950 m)
- Time zone: UTC-8 (Pacific)
  - Summer (DST): UTC-7 (Pacific)
- ZIP code: 97753
- Area codes: 458 and 541

Powell Butte is an unincorporated community in Crook County, Oregon, United States, and named after the nearby Powell Buttes. It is on Oregon Route 126 west of Prineville and east of Redmond. Powell Butte post office was established in 1909.

== Climate ==
This region experiences hot and dry summers. According to the Köppen Climate Classification system, Powell Butte has a warm-summer Mediterranean climate, abbreviated "Csb" on climate maps.

== Education ==
There is one school district in the county: Crook County School District.

Powell Butte houses the Powell Butte Community Charter School - In 2009 it became a charter school as per a vote from the district board of trustees. This went forward instead of an initial decision to close the school. The district sought to close the school due to a reduced budget. The impetus to convert to a charter came before the school district formally sought to close the school, as parents felt a closure would be likely upon seeing the grade span reduced to ending at the third grade instead of ending at the sixth grade. In response, people in Powell Butte did fundraising so the school would instead have its grade span up to the fifth grade. A $505,000 grant was used to help establish the charter for the school. The school relies on a septic tank.

All of Crook County is assigned to Crook County High School.

Crook County is in the boundary of Central Oregon Community College.

== Notable people ==
- Marcus Borg, academic, author, theologian
- Mike McLane, judge and former state representative
