= Hillsboro Intermodal Transit Facility =

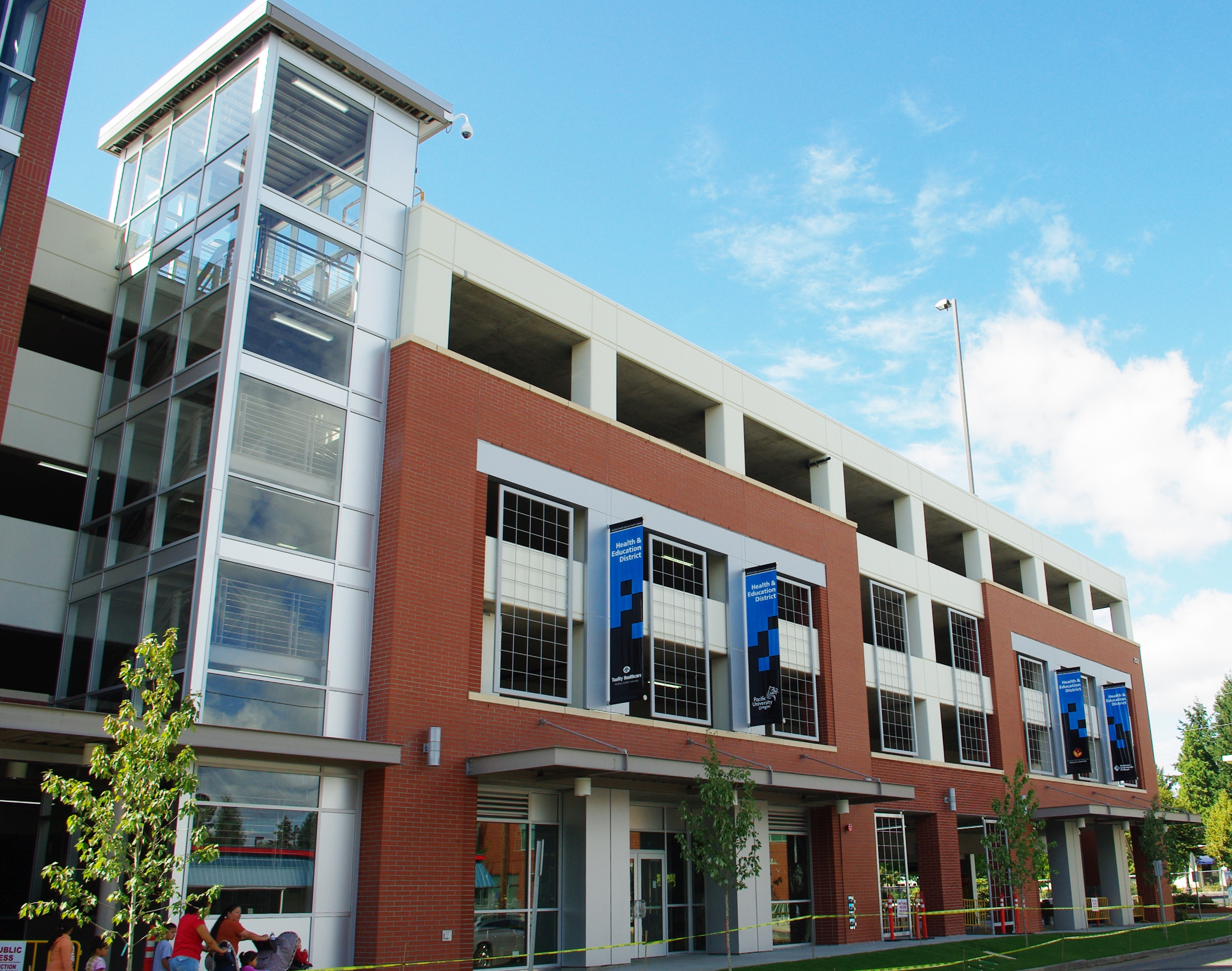
- East side of the structure in 2010
- Interactive map of the Hillsboro Intermodal Transit Facility area

General information
- Status: Completed
- Type: Parking garage
- Location: Hillsboro, Oregon, U.S.
- Coordinates: 45.5205°N 122.978°W
- Current tenants: Portland Community College
- Construction started: 2009
- Opening: 2010
- Inaugurated: August 31, 2010
- Cost: $16 million
- Owner: City of Hillsboro

Technical details
- Floor count: Five

Design and construction
- Architecture firm: LRS Architects
- Services engineer: Catena Consulting Engineers
- Main contractor: SKANSKA, USA

Hillsboro Intermodal Transit Facility (HITF) is a parking garage with extensive bicycle facilities located in Hillsboro in the U.S. state of Oregon. Located next to Hillsboro Medical Center (formerly Tuality Community Hospital), the facility has nearly 800 parking spaces, including 13 that have charging stations for electric vehicles, as well as 35 secured spaces for bicycles that include showers and lockers. Opened in 2010, HITF also has 20,000 square feet (1,900 m^{2}) of commercial space, which is mainly used by Portland Community College’s Hillsboro Center. The $16 million facility was a joint project between the city, Pacific University (as part of the university's Health Professions Campus), and Tuality Healthcare.

== History ==
A parking garage was part of Pacific University's original plan for the Health Professions Campus, and by September 2007 the city and school had received commitments for $7 million in funding out of a planned total price tag of $16 million. At that time, officials hoped to begin construction in 2009 on a four-level structure. In April 2009, the project was awarded $2.34 million in federal stimulus funds. In February 2009, the city approved a contract with Skanska USA for construction of the project with a bid of $13.1 million. Officials hoped to begin construction that spring, though the city still needed to find $4 million to fully fund the project.

In August 2009, a groundbreaking ceremony was held at the construction site, featuring U.S. Senator Ron Wyden, Mayor Jerry Willey, state representative David Edwards, and Pacific University president Lesley Hallick, among others. Construction had already begun at the time of the ceremony. The city hoped to attain LEED silver certification for the project due to its environmentally friendly aspects, including solar power and space for bicycles.

As of August 2009, the facility was expected to cost $16 million, with $7 million in funding coming from the city in the form of bonds backed by the lottery, $4.2 million in federal funds ($2.3 million of which were federal stimulus funds), about $1.6 million from Pacific, and the donation of the land by Tuality, valued at around $1.6 million. Hillsboro would own the facility, with Portland Community College signed on as a tenant for the first-floor commercial space.

Construction was scheduled to begin in late July 2009 on what had been a parking lot for the hospital. At that time the project had secured all funding needed, and due to lower costs caused by the recession, the construction was to be completed in a single phase instead of several phases as had been originally planned. Besides the parking spaces, the project called for Bike Central, 15 electric vehicle charging stations, and 19,000 square feet (1,800 m^{2}) of commercial space on the ground level. Additionally, the roof was to include solar panels and possibly wind turbines at a later time.

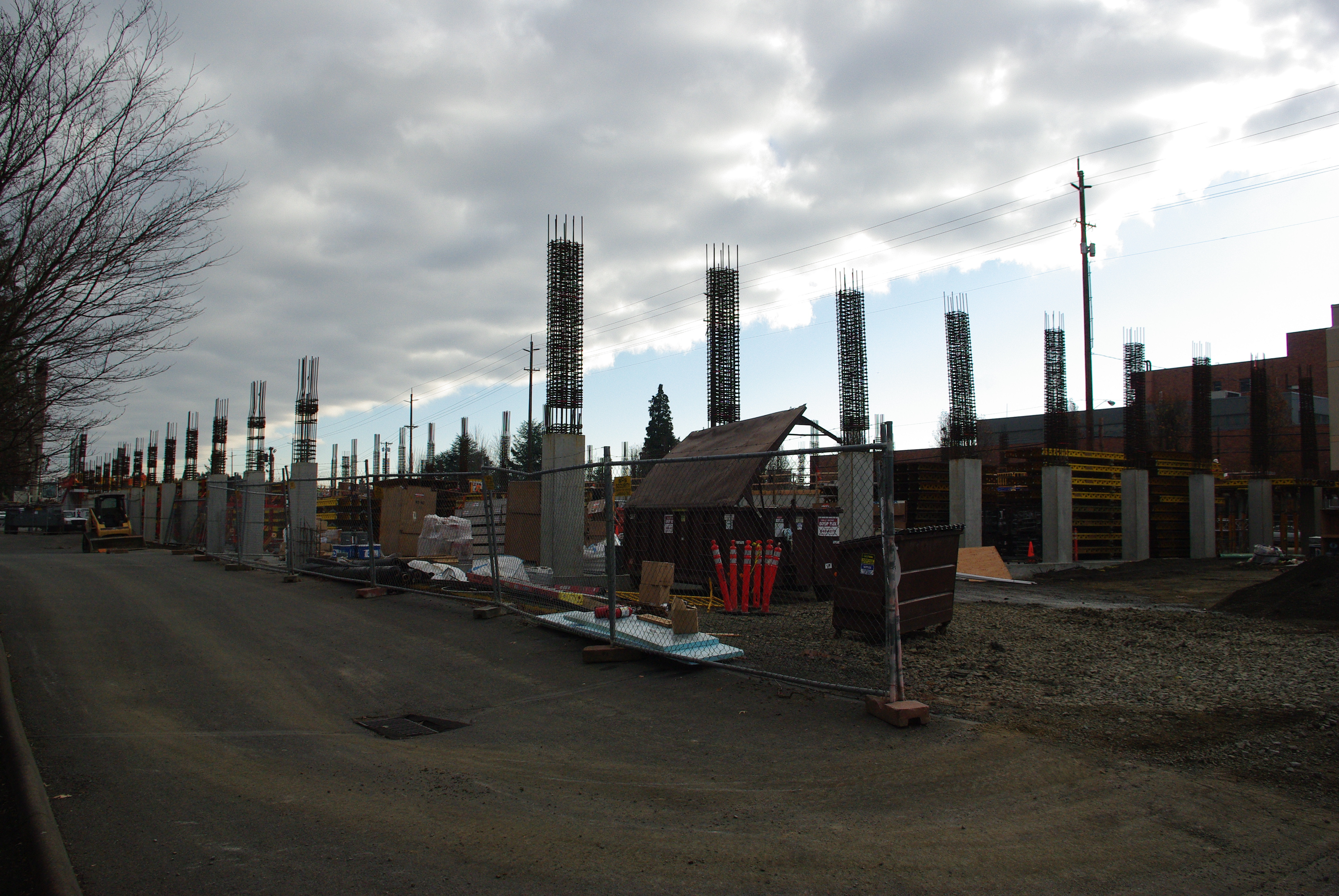
The structure in December 2009

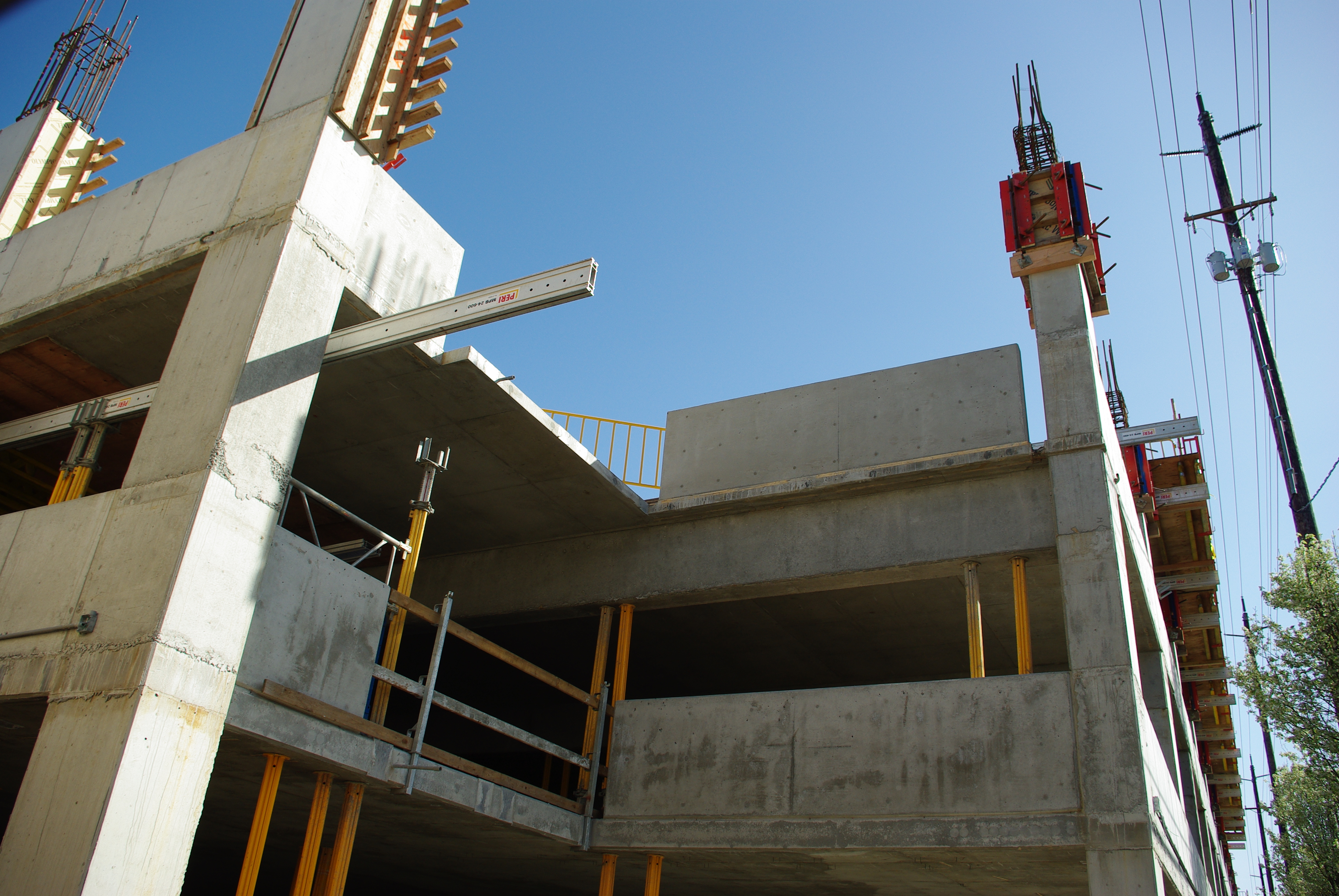
The structure in March 2010

On August 31, 2010, the facility officially opened with a ceremony that celebrated both its opening and the opening of the second building at the neighboring Health Professions Campus. Dignitaries at the event included Hillsboro mayor Willey, state senator Bruce Starr, and state representatives David Edwards and Chuck Riley. The facility actually opened in September. PCC moved its Hillsboro Education Center from near the Hatfield Government Center MAX station into the HITF in September 2010, and renamed it the Hillsboro Center. An indoor bicycle facility with secured parking for bicycles and showers opened in October 2010.

In March 2011, the project was named one of nine finalists for the Daily Journal of Commerce’s top construction project for public buildings in the $15 to $50 million range, with the University of Oregon’s PK Park listed as another finalist in that category. The facility came in third in its category.

== Details ==
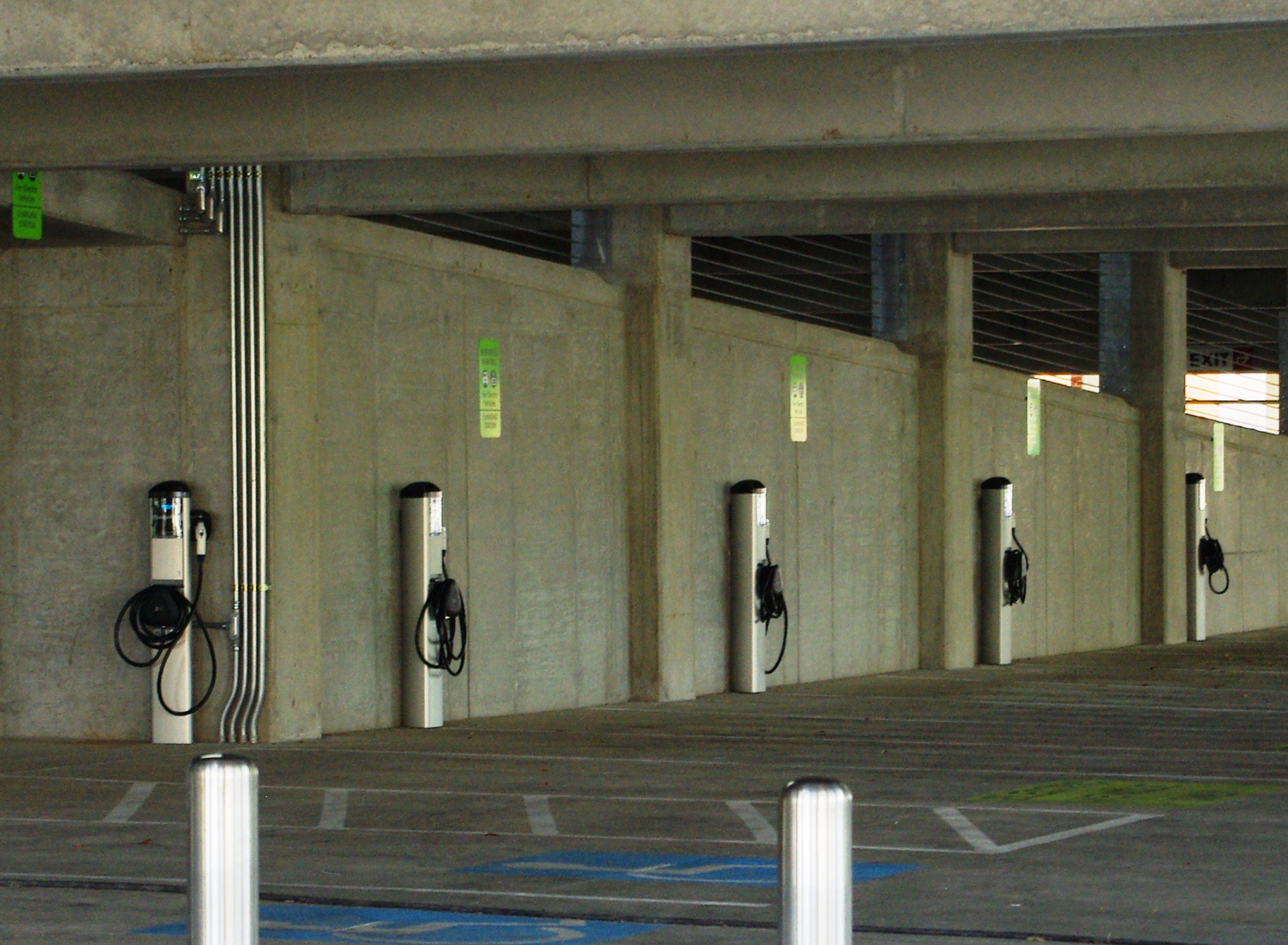
Electric vehicle charging stations

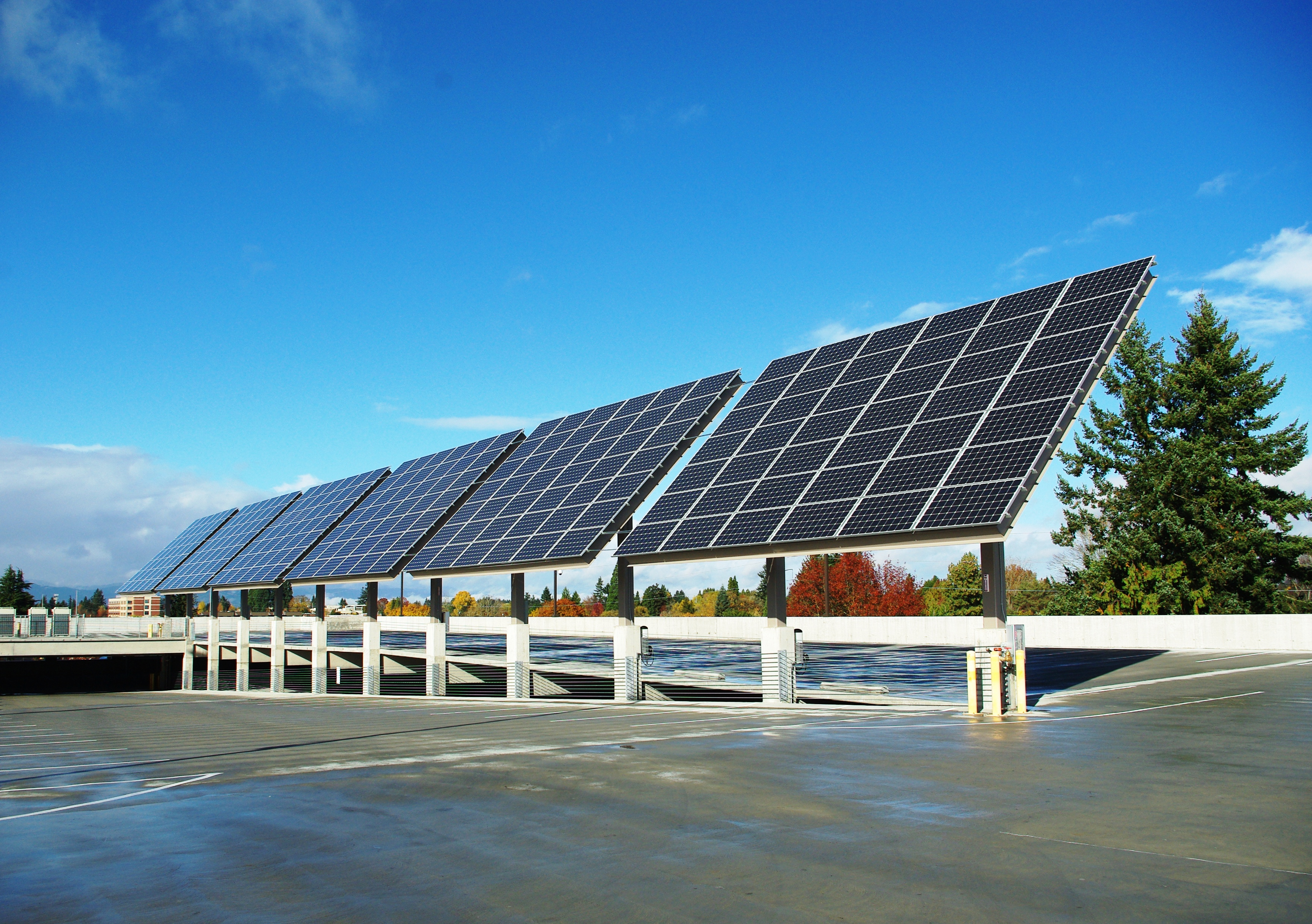
Solar panels on the roof

The facility is located between Baseline and Washington streets and between Seventh and Eighth avenues in Downtown Hillsboro, a half block away from the Hillsboro Health District station. The thirteen ChargePoint charging stations at the HITF are from Coulomb Technologies and include features that allow users to reserve times, find open stations, and be notified when a charge is complete, all remotely. Power for the charging stations comes in part from the solar panel array situated on the roof of the structure. These panels came from SolarWorld’s local plant in the city.

The concrete-and-steel structure has a brick veneer and stands five stories tall, with the fifth floor uncovered. HITF has 794 parking spaces total, as well as nearly 20,000-square-foot (1,900 m^{2}) of commercial space on the ground floor. Skanska USA built the structure for the city of Hillsboro, while LRS Architects did the design work and Catena Consulting Engineers provided engineering on the project. The facility was a joint project between the city, Pacific University, and Tuality Healthcare.

Located inside the commercial space are BikeStation Hillsboro and Portland Community College's Hillsboro Center. Hillsboro Center occupies 9,500 square feet (880 m^{2}) of the commercial space and serves about 500 credit-seeking students each term and an additional 200 students learning English as a second language. BikeStation Hillsboro contains 35 secured bicycle lockers, showers and lockers, and a bicycle repair space that provides tools in about 1,200 square feet (110 m^{2}) of space on the ground floor. Access to BikeStation requires a paid membership, with the program operated by Mobis Transportation.
