= Hemby =

Hemby is a surname. Notable people with the surname include:

- Natalie Hemby (born 1977), American country music songwriter and singer
- Roman Hemby (born 2002), American college football player
- Ron Hemby (fl. 1996–1997), member of American country music group The Buffalo Club

== See also ==
- Hamby, another surname
- Humby, another surname
