= Virginia Garcia Memorial Health Center =

Nonprofit healthcare provider

- Founded: 1975
- Type: Healthcare provider
- Purpose: Migrant and seasonal farmworkers and others with barriers to receiving health care
- Location: Hillsboro, Oregon
- Coordinates: 45°31′15″N 122°58′36″W
- Region served: Washington County; Yamhill County
- Product: Health Care
- Key people: Gil Muñoz, CEO
- Revenue: $60 million (2017)
- Employees: 550 (2017)
- Website: www.virginiagarcia.org

Virginia Garcia Memorial Health Center is a non-profit organization that provides primary health care in Washington and Yamhill counties in the U.S. state of Oregon. Established in 1975, Virginia Garcia operates five medical clinics, five dental clinics, one women's clinic, and six school-based health centers, and is based in Cornelius, Oregon. The organization was founded to provide medical care to migrant and farm workers and those with barriers to care. It was named after the daughter of migrant workers who died after failing to receive medical treatment for an infected cut on her foot. In 2016, Virginia Garcia had revenues of $60 million and served 45,000 patients.

== History ==
In 1975, Virginia Garcia, the six-year-old daughter of migrant workers, died of blood poisoning from a cut on her foot while living in a migrant camp in Washington County, Oregon. The death was seen as preventable and blamed on the lack of available medical care and the cultural and language barriers facing the primarily Spanish-speaking migrant laborers. Following the death, the Virginia Garcia Memorial Health Center was founded by a variety of people, including Jim Zaleski, with the support of St. Vincent Hospital (now Providence St. Vincent Medical Center) in Cornelius, Oregon. The clinic first opened on July 6, 1975, in a three-car garage in Cornelius. The center was originally part of Centro Cultural, a Cornelius-based non-profit group focused on assisting the Hispanic population in Washington County.

The Fred G. Meyer Memorial Trust awarded Virginia Garcia grants in 1983 and 1985 for prenatal programs. In 1988, the trust gave the center $220,000 as part of the trust's Children at Risk program. Also in 1988, Jim Zaleski was honored by the Oregon Human Development Corporation with that organization's Golden Aztec award for service towards minorities. Then based in Cornelius, the single-clinic provided service to 6,000 people in 1987 on a budget of $800,000. In 1994, the organization expanded with a new clinic in McMinnville.

By 1994, the annual budget had grown to $1.5 million, and Mildred J. Lane was serving as the director. Due to the implementation of the Oregon Health Plan, the center was to face cuts of up to $250,000 annually, so local hospitals, Tuality Community Hospital, St. Vincent Hospital and Medical Center, and Oregon Health Sciences University each donated equipment and employees to Virginia Garcia. Virginia Garcia added dental services to its offerings in April 1997 after opening two dental examination rooms. At that time, they had also received about $500,000 in grants towards the construction of a dental and vision services clinic to open in Cornelius. That 4,400-square-foot (410 m^{2}) clinic was designed by architecture firm Van Lom/Edwards and Scott Architecture. The organization had grown to 47 employees in 1999.

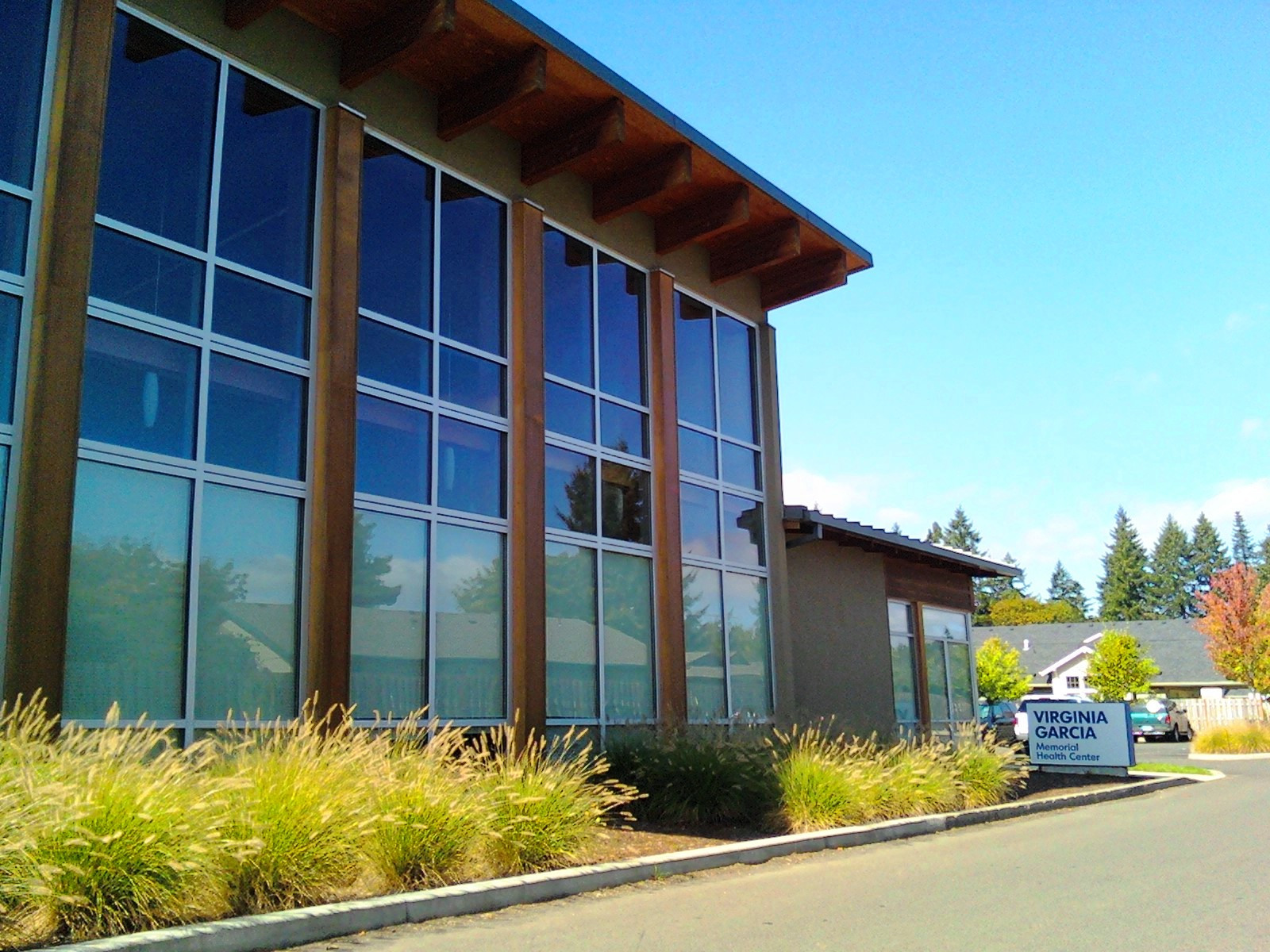
Clinic in McMinnville

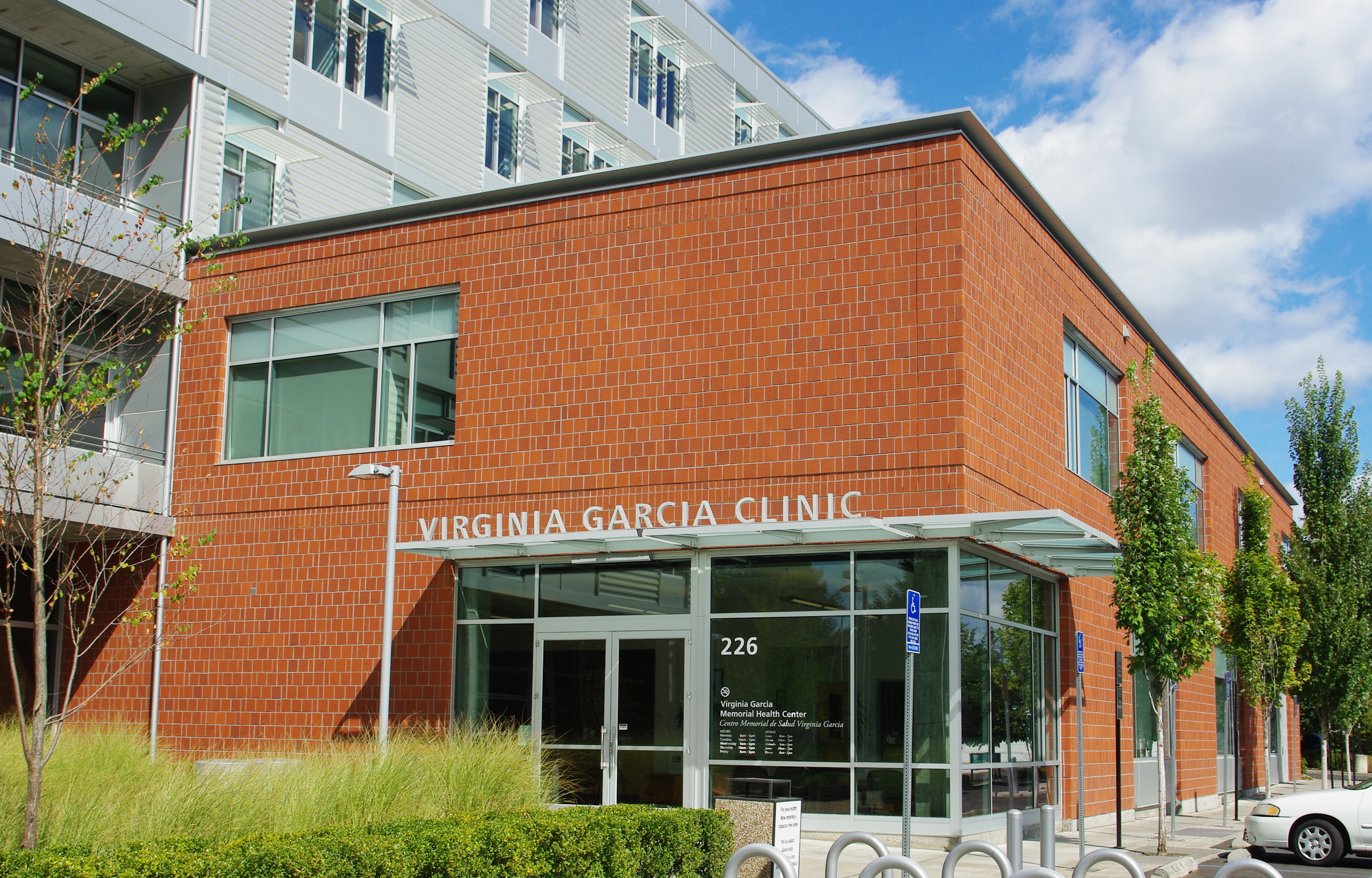
Clinic in Hillsboro

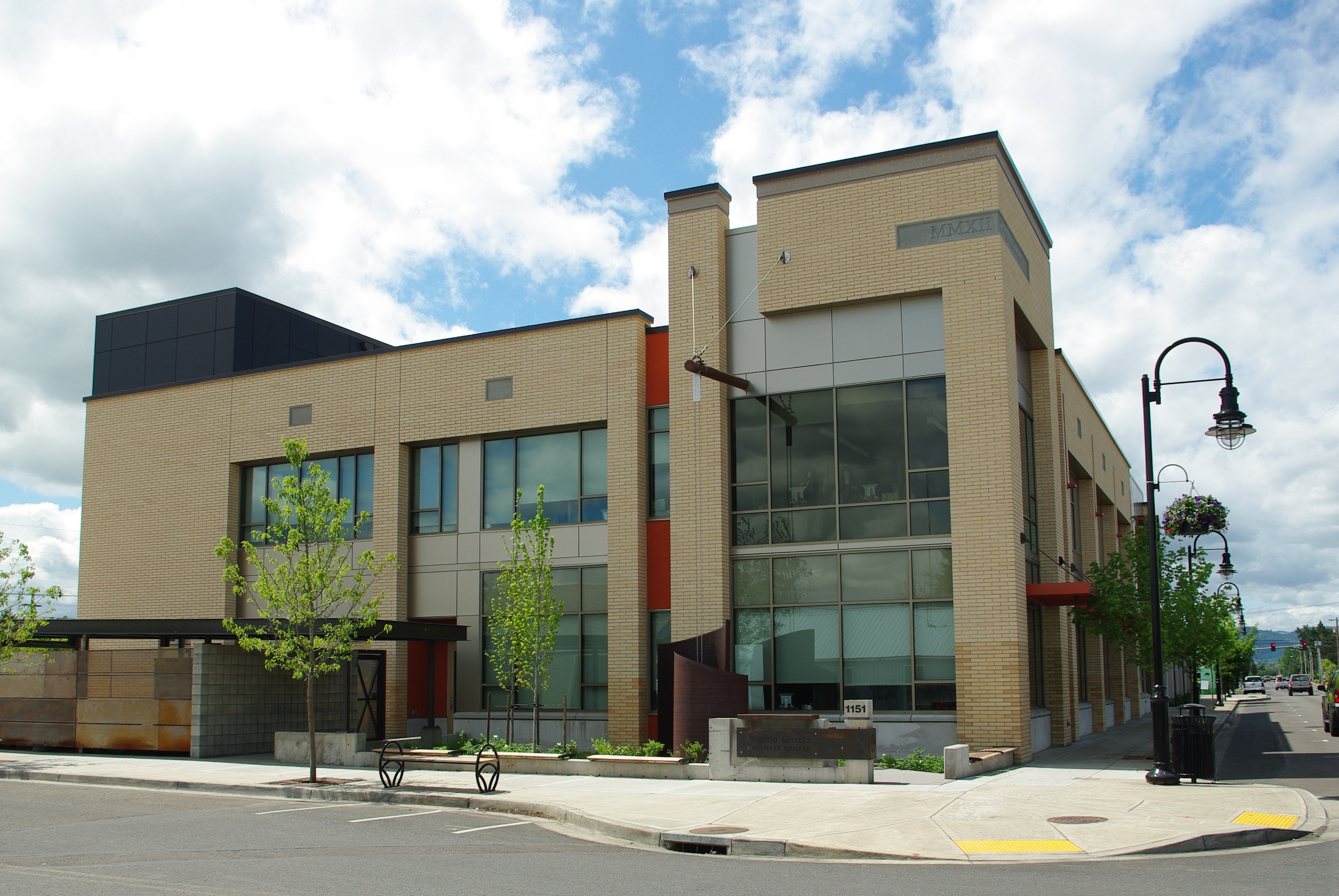
Wellness Center in Cornelius

A foundation, the Virginia Garcia Memorial Foundation, was established in 2001 to assist in fundraising. The clinic started planning in 2001 to open a clinic in Hillsboro, in a former juvenile home operated by Washington County. The space was rented for $1 per year, and renovations were paid for with a $320,000 grant from the federal government's Public Health Service. Clinic officials planned it as a temporary clinic until a larger space could be found. The 5,000-square-foot (460 m^{2}) clinic opened on West Main Street in March 2002, with expectations to serve 5,000 patients annually at the new location. Virginia Garcia received another federal grant in March of that year of $500,000, to be used toward a larger Hillsboro location.

In March 2004, Virginia Garcia opened a new clinic in Beaverton after receiving an annual grant of $759,500 from the Health Resources and Services Administration. The clinic at the Cedar Hills Crossing shopping center shared space with OHSU and also received $200,000 per year from Providence Health System. By 2005, Virginia Garcia had 65,000 patient visits a year across its four primary-care clinics, plus a dental and pharmacy office and a prenatal care clinic. In June 2005, the Beaverton clinic expanded when OHSU moved out of the shared building, and in August of that year, construction began on a larger clinic in McMinnville.

The organization moved the Hillsboro clinic to a new, larger location in October 2006. The new Hillsboro clinic on the ground floor of the Pacific University Health Professions Campus has 15,000 square feet (1,400 m^{2}) for its primary healthcare clinic and a pharmacy. Also in 2006, the center received a $600,000 grant from the U.S. Department of Health and Human Services to expand services to migrant and seasonal labor. By 2006, the clinics had grown to serve 30,000 patients and had an annual budget of nearly $21 million, funded largely by federal grants, payments from the Oregon Health Plan, donations, and some payments from patients and insurance plans. The McMinnville clinic was replaced in October 2006 with an expanded facility near the Willamette Valley Medical Center. Diana Walker was hired as the center's new executive director in April 2007, replacing Liz MacDonell, who resigned the previous year.

Virginia Garcia opened a dental clinic in June 2007 in Hillsboro, the third dental clinic run by the organization. The organization's foundation received a $120,000 grant in 2008 from the Meyer Memorial Trust to help expand the clinics’ volunteer programs. In August 2008, employee Maria Loredo was presented with a Healthcare Heroes Award by then-Senator Gordon Smith in honor of Loredo's 30 years at Virginia Garcia. Also in 2008, the clinics began converting to electronic medical records, which was supported in part by a $250,000 grant from Kaiser Northwest.

The organization announced plans in August 2009 to build a new 42,000-square-foot (3,900 m^{2}) complex in Cornelius to consolidate all Cornelius clinics and provide administrative offices. At the time, plans by architecture firm Scott/Edwards called for a design that met LEED Gold standards with an opening as early as 2011. The organization received a $12 million grant from the federal government in October 2010 to help pay for construction of the new 42,000-square-foot (3,900 m^{2}) complex. The grant was part of the 2010 Patient Protection and Affordable Care Act, and Virginia Garcia hoped to open the new clinics in July 2012.

In December 2009, the Portland Business Journal ranked Virginia Garcia as one of the top 15 non-profits in the Portland metropolitan area. At that time, the budget had grown to $23 million annually, and the organization employed 300 people. The following year, it was again named a top non-profit, ranking second among health non-profits by the same newspaper. The organization's pharmacy group was recognized by the Health Resources and Services Administration in October 2010 for its work in controlling diabetes. Construction on the Virginia Garcia Wellness Center began in 2011, and was completed in October 2012. In 2011, the clinics served 34,000 patients and generated $27 million in revenue.

== Locations ==
The organization operates clinics in Cornelius, Beaverton, Hillsboro, McMinnville, and Newberg. All five provide medical and dental care. Virginia Garcia also has six school-based clinics at Forest Grove High School, Tigard High School, Century High School, Tualatin High School, Willamina High School, and Beaverton High School, and a reproductive health clinic in Hillsboro. Virginia Garcia also operates a mobile clinic that is equipped to provide dental care, x-rays, and basic medical care.
