= Pacific University Health Professions Campus =

Educational institute in Hillsboro, Oregon

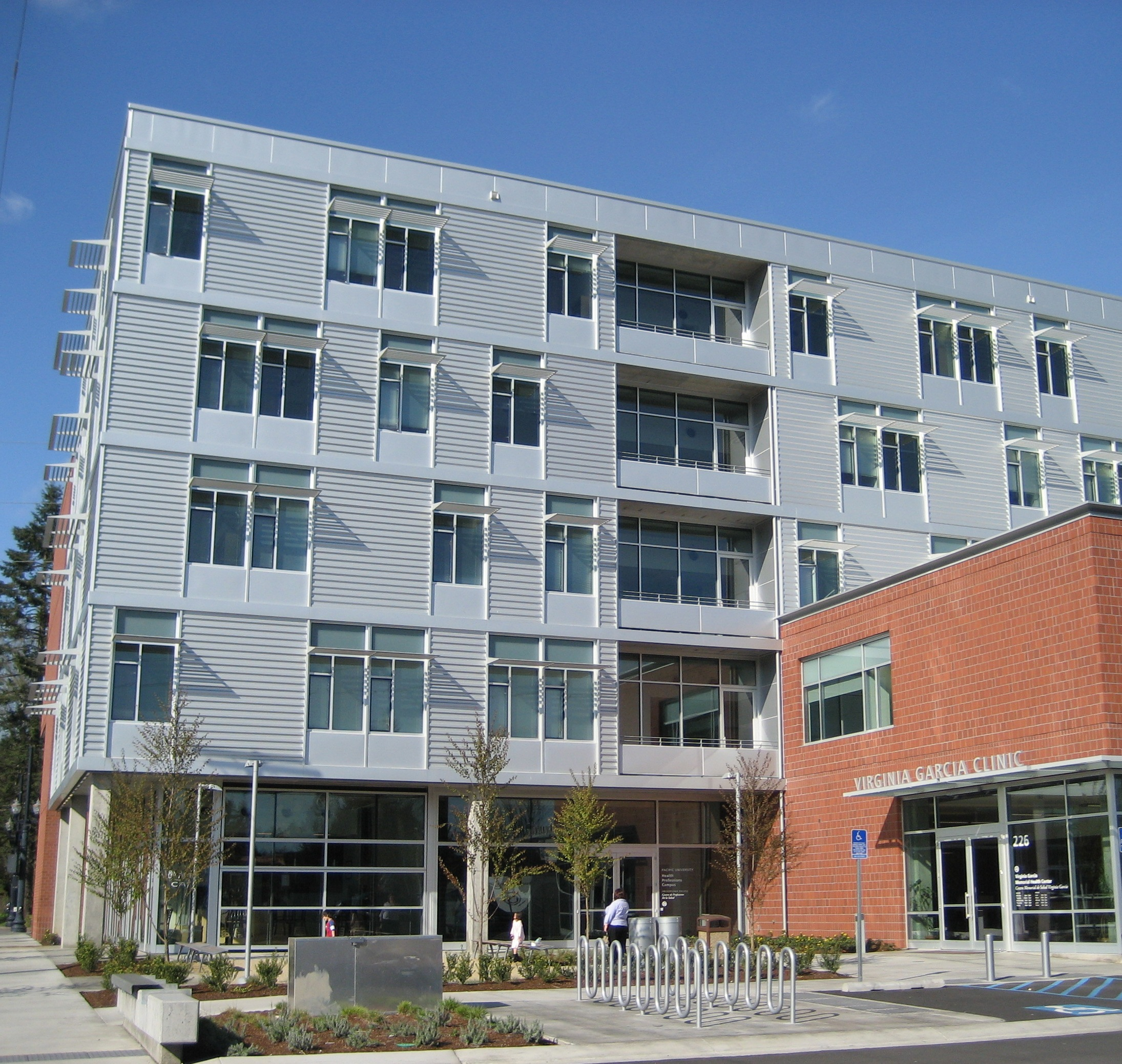
- Phillip D. Creighton Hall
- Type: Private
- Established: 2006
- Affiliations: Tuality Community Hospital
- Faculty: 78
- Students: 650
- Location: Hillsboro, Oregon, United States; 45°31′15″N 122°58′36″W
- Campus: satellite
- Website: http://www.pacificu.edu/hpc/info.cfm

The Pacific University Health Professions Campus is a satellite campus of Pacific University located in downtown Hillsboro, Oregon, United States. Opened in 2006, the campus contains the school's College of Health Professions with plans to move Pacific's College of Optometry and School of Professional Psychology in later phases. Housed in two brick buildings, the campus is located in the city's Health and Education District and adjacent to the Hillsboro Health District light rail station. The campus of Tuality Community Hospital is across Baseline Street to the south.

== History ==
In March 2005, Pacific University’s board of trustees decided to build a new 225,000-square-foot (20,900 m^{2}) campus in Hillsboro to house the college’s healthcare related programs. In May 2005, the university purchased a half-acre of land from Tuality Healthcare next to Tuality Hospital for the campus. Plans called for an initial 100,000-square-foot (9,300 m^{2}) building to cost $30 million followed by a 125,000-square-foot (11,600 m^{2}) building, both constructed over a three- to five-year period. The Virginia Garcia Memorial Health Center in Hillsboro was also to move into the building.

The decision to move these programs from the main Forest Grove campus was made to move the programs closer to hospitals the programs had relationships with such as Oregon Health & Sciences University and Tuality Hospital. The move also allowed the university to have students closer to patients and to allow for the College of Liberal Arts to expand and its main campus. Pacific balanced a need to expand closer to health care partners and its longstanding relationship with Forest Grove. Pacific partnered with the federal government, the city of Hillsboro, health care providers, Washington County, and private developers.

The second phase of the campus was expected to cost $45 million and have 125,000 square feet (11,600 m^{2}) of space, built on a second half-acre parcel the school purchased an option to from Tuality. Pacific’s psychology and optometry schools would relocate to the campus once the second phase was built. Once both parts were completed the campus was expected to have 1,300 students and approximately 150 faculty or staff.

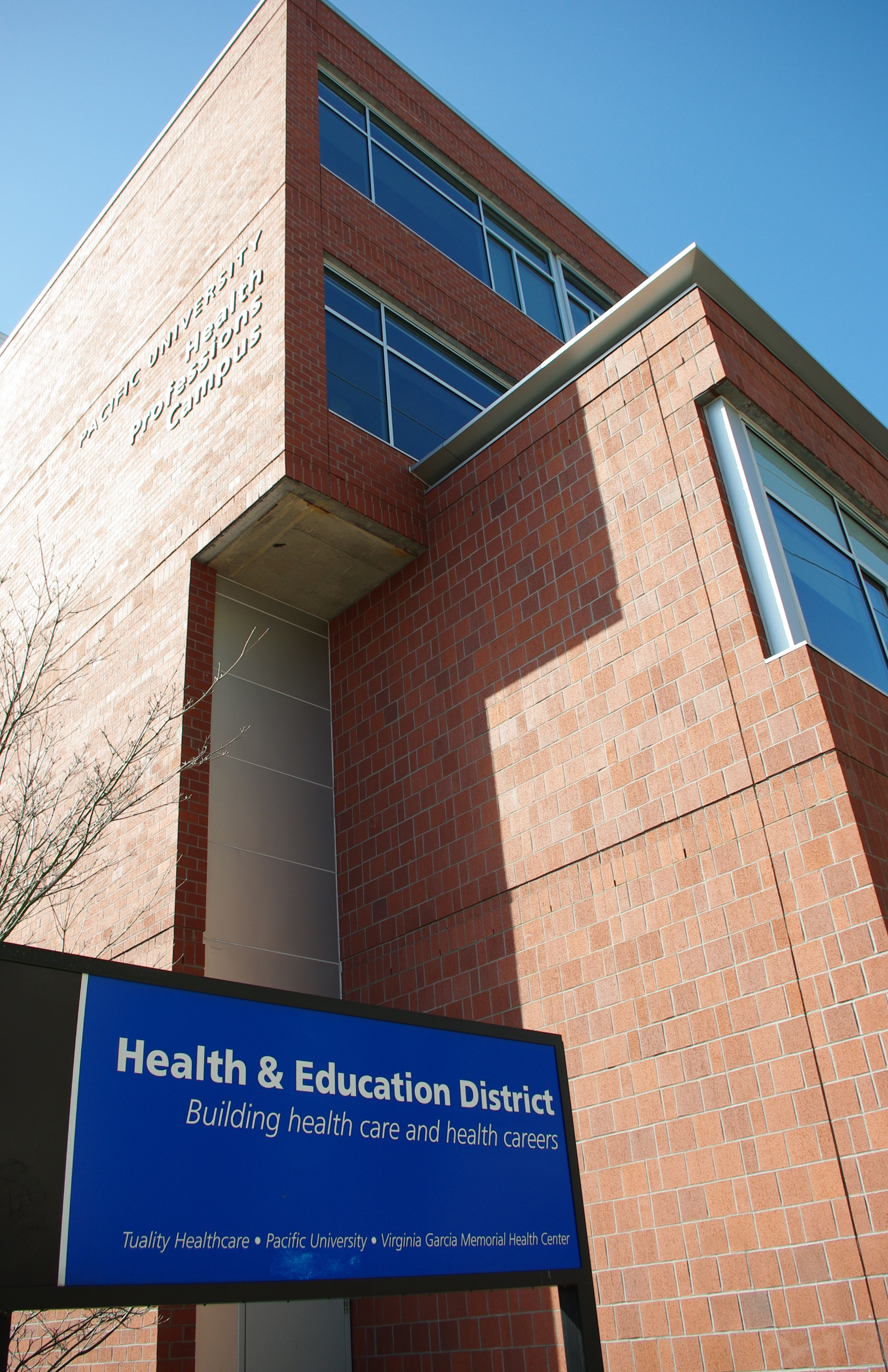
Signage for the Health and Education District

On August 9, 2005, a groundbreaking was held at the site and construction began with Lease Crutcher Lewis as the general contractor. In August 2006, the initial building of the campus was completed. Prior to opening, residents of the area raised concerns about adequate parking for the campus. These concerns led the city and university to seek state funding to build a parking garage estimated to cost $16 million. Once built, the 500 space garage would be owned by the city and would allow Pacific to complete the second phase of construction on the campus. Oregon gave the school lottery backed bonds in the amount of $7 million to help finance construction.

The first campus building was awarded Leadership in Energy and Environmental Design gold status in December 2007. Future plans call for three additional structures on the campus. A second building was approved for a location north of the first building by the city after a variance was needed to the local zoning code. Neighbors objected to the structure and lost an appeal to the Oregon Land Use Board of Appeals (LUBA) concerning the four-story building. In November 2008, the Oregon Court of Appeals affirmed the LUBA decision, with the land cleared by December. Construction of the 62,000 square feet (5,800 m^{2}) structure was planned to begin in 2009 with completion in early 2010. The school plans to open a third building in 2014, and in ten years a fourth building planned to be built on the site of part of the Miller Education Center.

Construction of the parking garage, the Hillsboro Intermodal Transit Facility, began in 2009 and will include electric vehicle charging stations and a secure bike facility that has lockers and showers. The original building on campus was dedicated as Phillip D. Creighton Hall in July 2009. Creighton had been the president of Pacific when the campus was developed. In August 2010, the second building on campus opened, and the area around the campus became part of Hillsboro's Health and Education District. A doctoral program for audiology was added in 2012, housed in Tuality Healthcare's 7th Avenue Medical Plaza a few blocks from the university's campus.

== Details ==
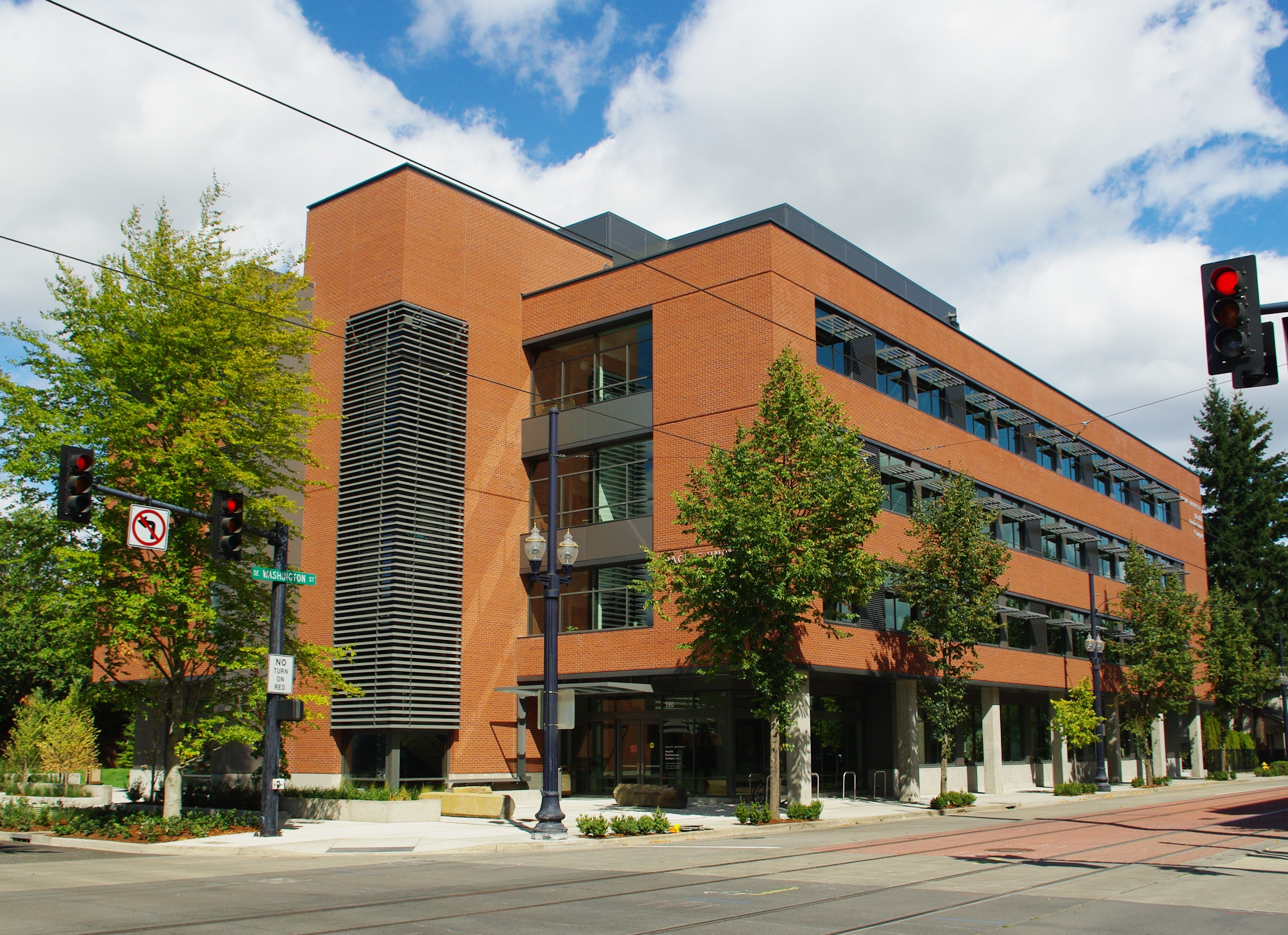
Second building on the campus

Programs at the campus are part of the College of Health Professions. The student body includes both graduate and undergraduate students, totaling 650 as of 2007. Pacific offers programs in dental health, pharmacy, occupation therapy, and physical therapy among others at the campus. Other schools located at the campus include the School of Physician Assistant Studies and part of the School of Professional Psychology, along with a masters program in healthcare administration. The building also houses psychology, optometry, dental health, and physical therapy clinics where students receive hands-on training.

Plans for the second building include a wellness center with programs to include psychology and optometry. A total of four buildings and a parking garage are planned for the campus, with the garage a joint project with the city and hospital. The campus includes a library. A nursing program may eventually be added to the campus. Pacific expects the campus to have around 1,000 students once the first three buildings are opened, with about 350 students enrolled in 2009.

=== Building ===
The first building, a five-story 104,000-square-foot (9,700 m^{2}) structure, was designed by SRG Partnership. This building was named as Phillip D. Creighton Hall in 2009 after retired school president Phillip Creighton. Costing $30 million to build, it includes cantilevered shades on the windows, a rainwater collection system used to provide non-potable water for toilets, an advanced HVAC system, and the building is aligned in a north-south orientation. The building exterior consists of orange brick and silver-colored metal siding. The Virginia Garcia Memorial Health Center occupies 15,500 square feet (1,440 m^{2}) on the first two floors of the structure.
