= Hamby =

Hamby is a Danish and English surname.

Meaning of Hamby (English): habitational name from Hanby near Welton le Marsh, in Lincolnshire, which is named from the Old Norse personal name Hundi + Old Norse býr ‘farmstead’, ‘settlement’. Perhaps an altered spelling of French Hambye, a habitational name from a place in Manche.

Notable people with the surname include:

- Anthony Freskyn Charles Hamby Chaplin, 3rd Viscount Chaplin (1906–1981), amateur zoologist and musician
- Barbara Hamby (born 1952), American poet, fiction writer, editor and critic
- Dearica Hamby (born 1993), American women's basketball player
- Jeannette Hamby (1933–2012), American politician and nurse
- Jessica Hamby, fictional character in the True Blood series
- Jim Hamby (1897–1991), American baseball player
- Priscilla Hamby (born 1982), American illustrator and comic book artist
- Roger Hamby (born 1943), former NASCAR Cup Series driver

== See also ==
- Hamby Park, municipal park in northwest Hillsboro, Oregon, United States
- Hamby Shore (1886–1918), Canadian ice hockey player
- Hambye
