= Joe Gallegos =

American politician

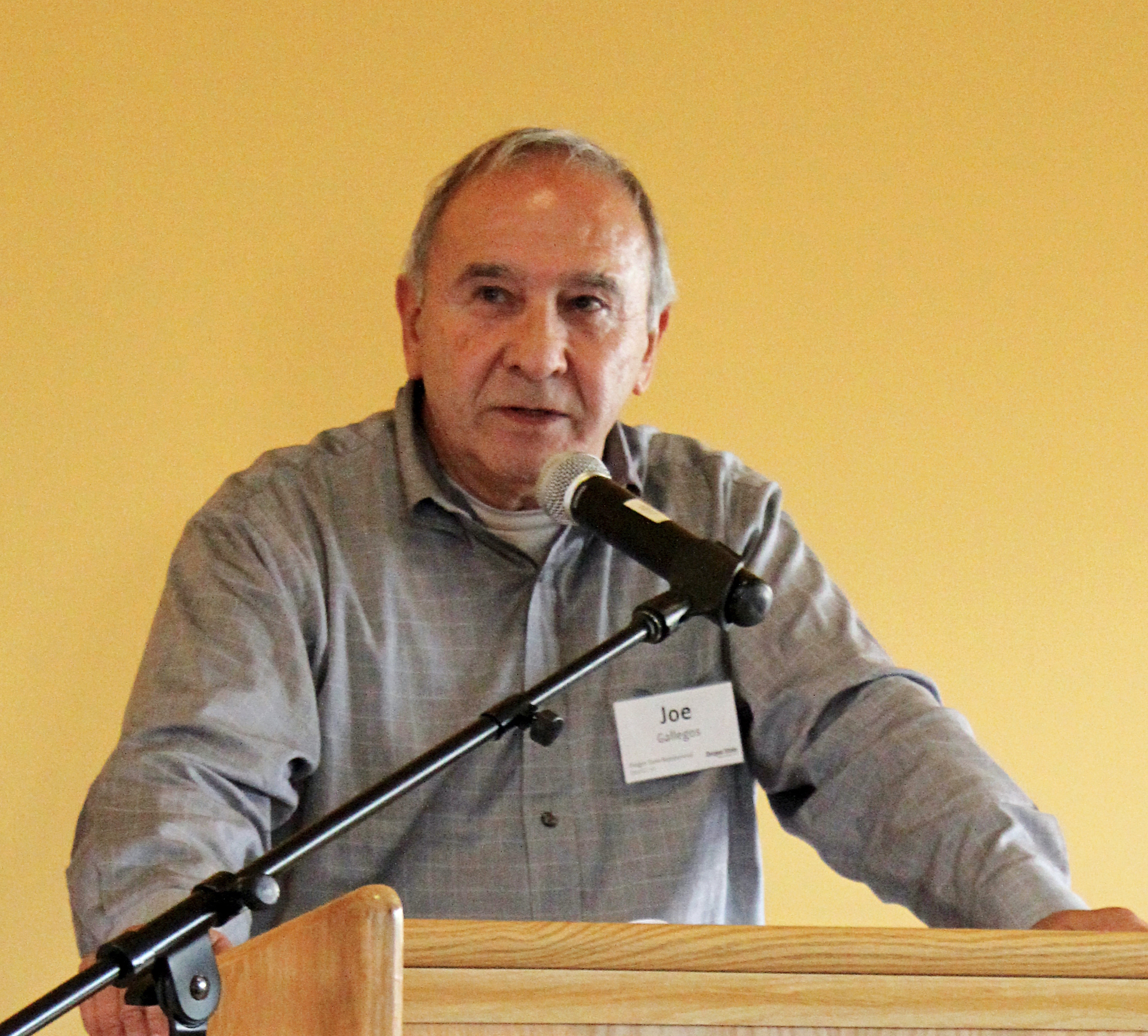
- Joe Gallegos in 2014

Member of the Oregon House of Representatives from the 30th district
- In office January 14, 2013 – January 9, 2017
- Preceded by: Shawn Lindsay
- Succeeded by: Janeen Sollman

Personal details
- Born: November 28, 1941 (age 84) San Antonio, Texas, U.S.
- Party: Democratic
- Education: Portland State University (BS, MSW); University of Denver (PhD)
- Website: electjoegallegos.com

Joseph Gallegos (born November 28, 1941) is an American politician and a former Democratic member of the Oregon House of Representatives, representing District 30 from 2013 until 2017.

== Biography ==
Gallegos was born in San Antonio, Texas, but raised in Portland, Oregon, where his parents relocated during World War II to work in the city's shipyards. As a young adult, he also worked in the shipyards before serving one year in the U.S. Air Force and three years with the Oregon Air National Guard during the Vietnam War.

After completing his military service, Gallegos earned his BS in psychology and his master's degree in social work from Portland State University, and his PhD from the University of Denver. In 1982, he helped create a minority social work curriculum at the University of Washington before becoming a professor at San Diego State University, where he served on the faculty from 1983 to 1988. From 1990 to 2010, Gallegos served on the board directors of the Catholic Charities in Portland.

== Elections ==
- 2012 To challenge incumbent Republican Representative Shawn Lindsay for the District 30 seat, Adriana Canas was unopposed for the May 15, 2012 Democratic Primary, winning with 2,769 votes; after Canas withdrew, Gallegos won the July 21 special election by precinct committee persons to replace her, and won the three-way November 6, 2012 General Election with 12,299 votes (49.4%) against Representative Lindsay and Libertarian candidate Kyle Markley.

== Electoral history ==
2012 Oregon State Representative, 30th district
Party	Candidate	Votes	%
Democratic	Joe Gallegos	12,299	49.4
Republican	Shawn Lindsay	11,096	44.6
Libertarian	Kyle Markley	1,441	5.8
Write-in		43	0.2
Total votes		24,879	100%

2014 Oregon State Representative, 30th district
Party	Candidate	Votes	%
Democratic	Joe Gallegos	10,426	50.0
Republican	Dan Mason	8,518	40.8
Libertarian	Kyle Markley	1,860	8.9
Write-in		50	0.2
Total votes		20,854	100%
