= Janeen Sollman =

American politician

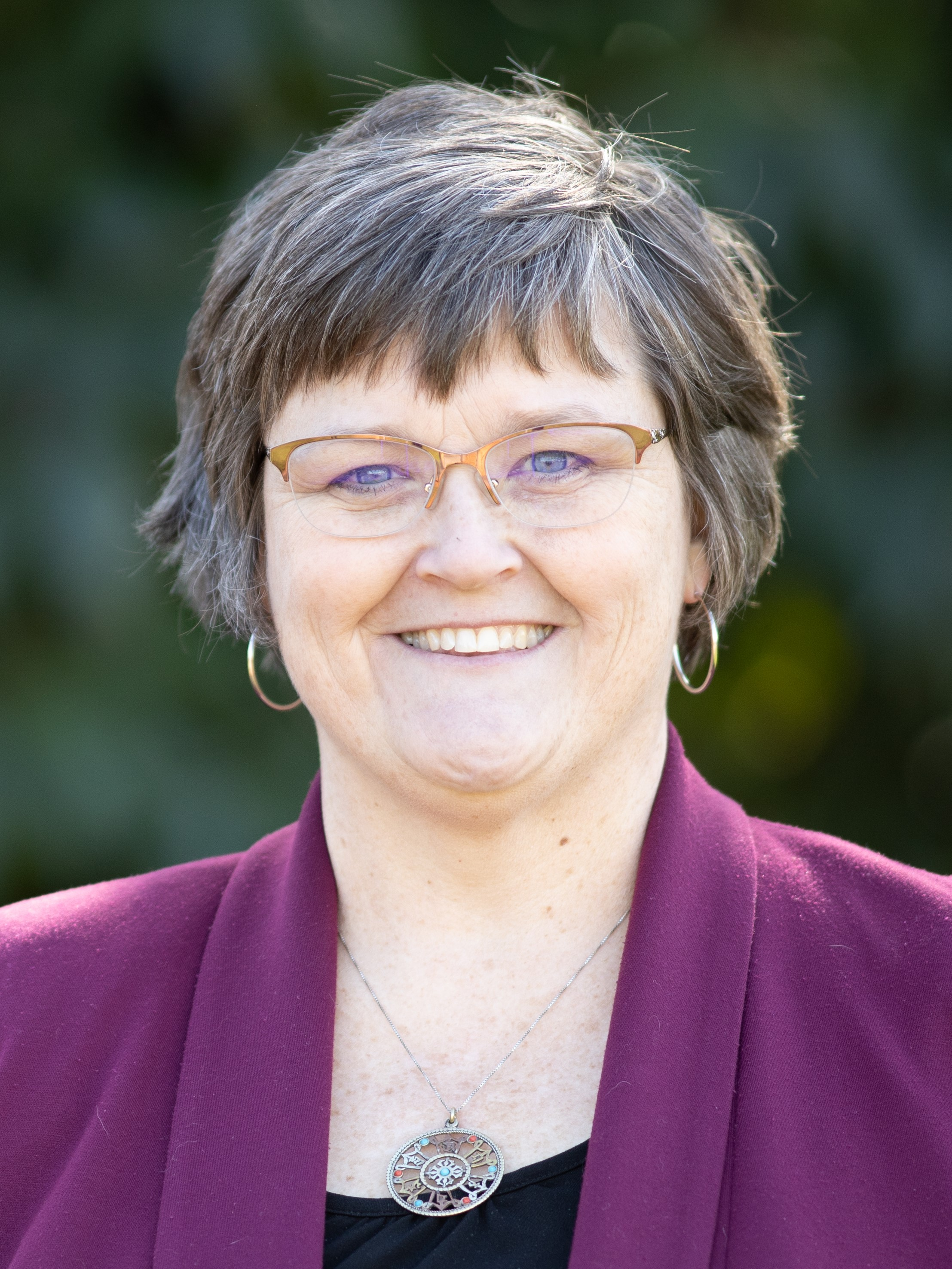
- Janeen Sollman in 2020

Member of the Oregon Senate from the 15th district
- Incumbent
- Assumed office January 14, 2022
- Preceded by: Chuck Riley

Member of the Oregon House of Representatives from the 30th district
- In office January 9, 2017 – January 14, 2022
- Preceded by: Joe Gallegos
- Succeeded by: Nathan Sosa

Personal details
- Born: Subic Bay, Philippines
- Party: Democratic
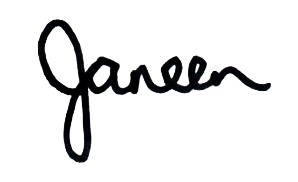
- Signature

Janeen A. Sollman is an American politician serving as a member of the Oregon State Senate from the 15th district. A Democrat, she previously served as a member of the Oregon House of Representatives from 2017 to 2022. She chairs the Senate Energy and Environment Committee and co-chairs the Joint Ways and Means Subcommittee on Education. Her term ends on January 11, 2027.

== Career ==
Sollman served on board of the Hillsboro School District from 2009 until 2017. She served as board chair from 2011 until 2013. Sollman filed to run for the House after incumbent Democrat Joe Gallegos announced his retirement. In the general election, she defeated Republican Dan Mason and Libertarian Kyle Markley, receiving 52% of the vote.

As a House member, Sollman was a chief sponsor of Senate Bill 664 (2019), which requires Oregon school districts to teach Holocaust and genocide education beginning in the 2020-21 school year.

In January 2022, Sollman was appointed to the Oregon State Senate by members of the Washington County Board of Commissioners. She was succeeded in the House by Nathan Sosa.

In June 2024, Sollman sought the position as the Senate Democrats' next majority leader, but lost to Kathleen Taylor. She continued as deputy majority leader.

In 2024, Sollman carried legislation establishing a right-to-repair requirement for electronic devices, which passed over objections from technology manufacturers.

In March 2025, Sollman was one of two Senate Democrats to vote against Senate Bill 916, which would provide unemployment benefits to striking workers. She said she was concerned about the cost to local governments and school districts. A revised version limiting benefits to ten weeks later passed both chambers. In April 2026, Sollman claimed representatives of two labor organizations had pressured her over her vote.

In 2025, Sollman was a chief sponsor of the POWER Act (House Bill 3546), which creates a separate rate class for electricity customers whose demands exceeds 20 megawatts, a category that includes large data centers. In 2026, the Oregon Public Utility Commission approved a 29% rate increase for data center customers under the new framework.

Sollman was chief sponsor of Senate Bill 551 (2025), which prohibits plastic film bags at checkout beginning January 1, 2027. The House removed provisions in the original bill covering plastic utensils and hotel toiletries.

Sollman sought a second term in the May 19, 2026 Democratic primary, facing Myrna Muñoz, an educator who works for the Oregon Department of Education, and Nelly Donis-Purcell. Sollman led in early returns on election night, but later ballots put Muñoz ahead, and Sollman conceded.

Several groups that typically support Democratic incumbents backed Muñoz. SEIU opposed Sollman primarily over her vote against Senate Bill 916. The Oregon Education Association objected to a school funding proposal she introduced in 2026 and the Oregon League of Conservation Voters viewed her as an obstacle on clean energy and climate policy.

The race also became a referendum on data centers in Hillsboro. Muñoz and other critics characterized Sollman as supportive of data center expansion, citing her sponsorship of Senate Bill 1586, which would have brought land into Hillsboro's urban growth boundary for industrial use and which she did not advance after public opposition. Sollman said the bill would have barred stand-alone data centers and that the characterization of her record was unfair. She attributed her loss largely to her SB 916 vote, which she said she did not regret.

== Personal life ==
Sollman is married and has two children.

== Electoral history ==
2016 Oregon State Representative, 30th district
Party	Candidate	Votes	%
Democratic	Janeen Sollman	15,336	52.2
Republican	Dan Mason	11,473	39.1
Libertarian	Kyle Markley	2,498	8.5
Write-in		61	0.2
Total votes		29,368	100%

2018 Oregon State Representative, 30th district
Party	Candidate	Votes	%
Democratic	Janeen Sollman	17,459	61.7
Republican	Dorothy Merritt	8,630	30.5
Libertarian	Kyle Markley	2,188	7.7
Write-in		34	0.1
Total votes		28,311	100%

2020 Oregon State Representative, 30th district
Party	Candidate	Votes	%
Democratic	Janeen Sollman	25,837	93.2
Write-in		1,892	6.8
Total votes		27,729	100%

2022 Oregon State Senator, 15th district
Party	Candidate	Votes	%
Democratic	Janeen Sollman	28,225	55.5
Republican	Carolina Malmedal	22,566	44.4
Write-in		88	0.2
Total votes		50,879	100%
