= Shawn Lindsay =

American politician

Shawn M. Lindsay

Member of the Oregon House of Representatives from the 30th district
- In office 2011–2013
- Preceded by: David Edwards
- Succeeded by: Joe Gallegos

Personal details
- Born: January 7, 1973 (age 53) Ukiah, California
- Party: Republican
- Spouse: Amanda
- Children: 3
- Education: Brigham Young University; Washburn University School of Law
- Profession: Attorney
- Website: www.leg.state.or.us/lindsay

Shawn M. Lindsay (born January 7, 1973) is an American attorney and politician in the state of Oregon. He practices law in the Portland metropolitan area and from 2011 to 2013, was a member of the Oregon House of Representatives, representing District 30, which is primarily Hillsboro in Washington County.

== Early life ==
Shawn Lindsay was born in Ukiah, California, on January 7, 1973, and grew up in Spanish Fork, Utah, in the Provo–Orem metropolitan area. He was raised by a single mother and earned a Bachelor of Arts degree from nearby Brigham Young University. In 2001, he earned a Juris Doctor from Washburn University School of Law in Topeka, Kansas. A member of the Church of Jesus Christ of Latter-day Saints (LDS Church), he is married to Amanda, and they have three daughters, with the family living in Hillsboro.

== Legal career ==
Following law school, he moved to Oregon and passed the bar in 2002 and began practicing law. Lindsay served as general counsel for Special Olympics Oregon in 2007 when he was with the law firm of Markowitz Herbold Glade & Mehlhaf as part of the firm's pro bono work. In May 2008, he was hired at Portland law firm Lane Powell as an associate attorney in the firm's intellectual property and business groups. In January 2011, he was promoted to counsel at the firm. He was named as a Rising Star in August 2011 as among Oregon lawyers.

== Political career ==
Lindsay entered politics in 2010 when he entered the race for Oregon House district 30 to challenge incumbent David Edwards. Edwards dropped out of the race in July 2010, and Lindsay faced Doug Ainge, the father of Erik Ainge, in the November general election. Lindsay then defeated Ainge in the general election (53% to 46%) and took office the next January.

During the 2011 legislative session Lindsay served as co-chair of the redistricting committee. Lindsay announced in July 2011 that he would introduce a law to require parents to report their children missing within 24 hours in response to the acquittal of Casey Anthony in Florida. In February 2012, he introduced the bill, but cited the disappearance of Kyron Horman as the impetus for the proposed law. In August 2011, he declined to run for the Republican nomination in the special election for the open seat in Congress following David Wu’s resignation. Lindsay lost his reelection bid in November 2012 to Democrat Joe Gallegos, and started a political action committee in December 2012.

== Electoral history ==
2010 Oregon State Representative, 30th district
Party	Candidate	Votes	%
Republican	Shawn Lindsay	12,501	53.3
Democratic	Doug Ainge	10,893	46.4
Write-in		59	0.3
Total votes		23,453	100%

2012 Oregon State Representative, 30th district
Party	Candidate	Votes	%
Democratic	Joe Gallegos	12,299	49.4
Republican	Shawn Lindsay	11,096	44.6
Libertarian	Kyle Markley	1,441	5.8
Write-in		43	0.2
Total votes		24,879	100%
