= Hillsboro Health District station =

Light rail station in Hillsboro, Oregon, U.S.

Hillsboro Health District
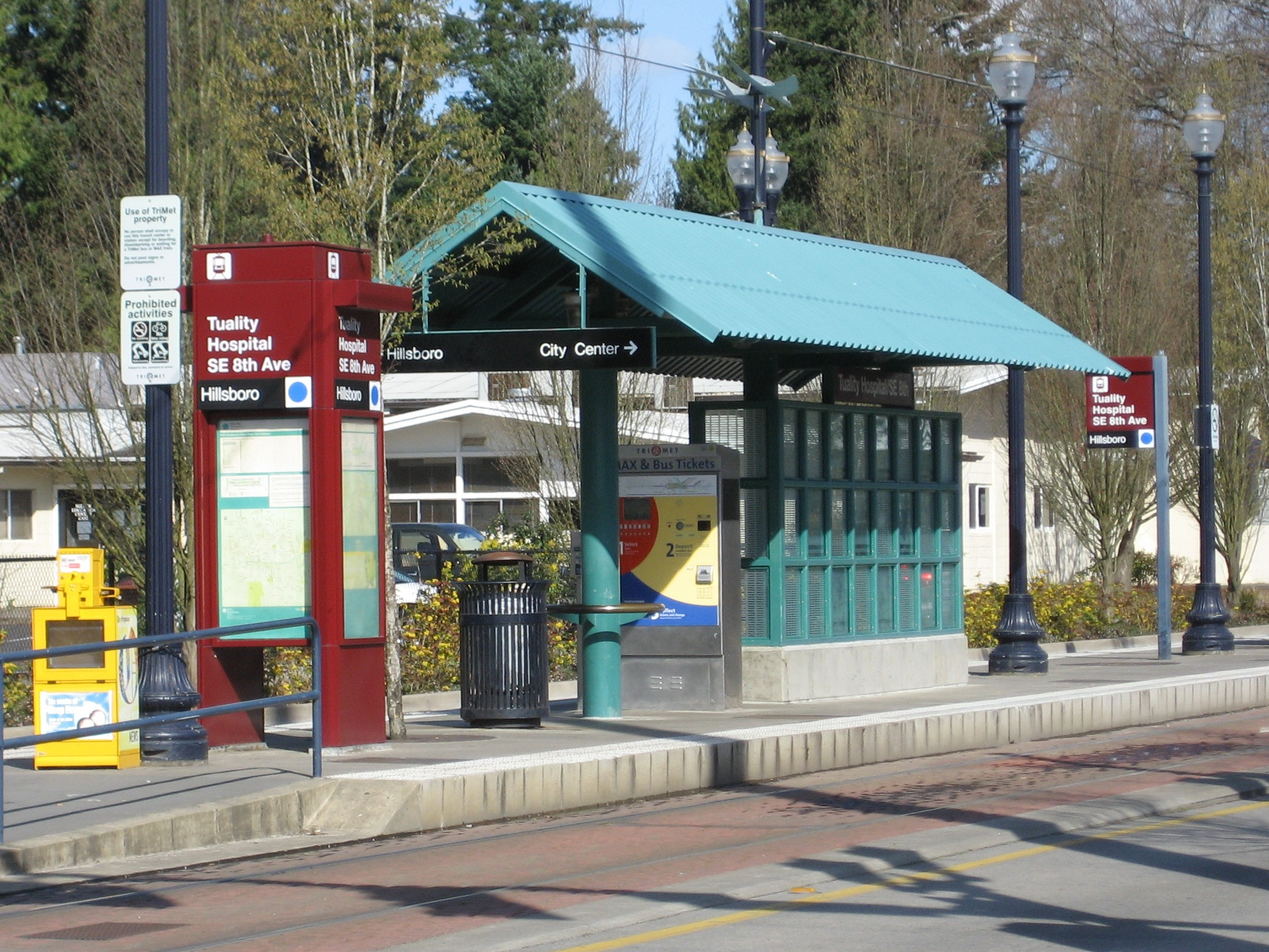

General information
- Location: SE Washington St at SE 8th Ave; Hillsboro, Oregon; USA
- Coordinates: 45°31′17″N 122°58′42″W
- Owner: TriMet
- Platforms: 1 island platform
- Tracks: 2
- Connections: TriMet: 47, 48, 57

Construction
- Parking: 85 spaces in the Hillsboro Intermodal Transit Facility

History
- Opened: September 12, 1998
- Former names: Tuality Hospital/SE 8th Avenue station

Services
Preceding station	TriMet	Following station
Hillsboro Transit Center toward Hatfield Government Center	Blue Line	Washington/SE 12th Ave toward Cleveland Ave
Location

Hillsboro Health District, formerly Tuality Hospital/Southeast 8th Avenue, is a light rail station on the MAX Blue Line in Hillsboro, Oregon, United States. Opened in 1998, it is the 18th stop westbound on the Westside MAX. The station has a single island platform with a passenger shelter, with the station primarily serving the campus of Hillsboro Medical Center (known until 2019 as Tuality Community Hospital).

== History ==
In 1994, construction of the Westside MAX project began. On September 12, 1998, the station opened along with the rest of the Westside MAX line. In September 2006, the Pacific University Health Professions Campus opened next to the station. Pacific decided to build the campus there due partly to the presence of the station. Pacific opened a second building in August 2010 while the city, in a joint venture with the hospital and school, opened the Hillsboro Intermodal Transit Facility the following month. In March 2011, TriMet received a federal grant to pay for the installation of security cameras at the station. The MAX station was designed by OTAK Inc. TriMet announced the station will be renamed to "Hillsboro Health District" on August 25, 2024, following a service update.

== Amenities ==
The station is located on Southeast Washington Street between Seventh and Eighth avenues. It is one block from Hillsboro Medical Center and one-half block, or about 250 feet (76 m), from the Hillsboro Intermodal Transit Facility (HITF). The station originally did not have any park-and-ride facilities, but in April 2012, 85 spaces in the nearby HITF were designated for park-and-ride use by TriMet riders.

=== Artwork ===
The public art at the station relates to the hospital, with themes of hope, light, and healing. Individual pieces at the station includes 300 bronze swallows, considered a symbol of hope. Implanted into the concrete, the swallows are accented by a quote from Shakespeare, while swallows also adorn the weather vanes that sit atop the passenger shelter. Other artwork at the station includes a picture of Minnie Jones Coy (the founder of the hospital) and the "Quilt of Traditional Remedies" by Jane Kies. Recipes for old medicinal remedies are etched into the glass windscreen in the passenger shelter, while traditional medicine plants grow around the station.
