= Nathan Sosa =

American politician

Member of the Oregon House of Representatives from the 30th district
- Incumbent
- Assumed office February 1, 2022
- Preceded by: Janeen Sollman

Personal details
- Party: Democratic
- Education: University of Nevada, Las Vegas (BA, JD)

Nathan Sosa is an American attorney and politician serving as a member of the Oregon House of Representatives from the 30th district. He assumed office on February 1, 2022.

== Early life and education ==
Sosa grew up in Las Vegas. He and his younger brother were raised by their single mother in a working-class family. As a teenager, he began working at a grocery store to help financially support his family.

After graduating from high school, he attended the University of Nevada, Las Vegas. While pursuing his undergraduate degree, he worked two jobs and also spent multiple semesters as an intern in the office of Las Vegas Mayor Oscar Goodman. He earned his Bachelor of Arts in History degree in 2006. He went on to earn his Juris Doctor from UNLV's William S. Boyd School of Law in 2009.

== Legal career ==
From 2009 to 2014, Sosa worked as an associate attorney in Las Vegas. In early 2014, Sosa and his wife moved to Washington County, Oregon. He continued his career in the law and devoted his legal practice to helping individuals navigate the insurance claims process. In 2022, Sosa became a partner in the law firm of Vames Wang Sosa Hood Injury Lawyers.

== Community involvement ==
In addition to his legal work, Sosa has been an active volunteer with multiple organizations.

In 2015, he joined the board of the Hillsboro Schools Foundation. He was elected as the board's vice president from 2017 – 2018 and president from 2019 – 2022. He also served on the Grant Committee and currently serves on the Marketing Committee.

In 2017, he was appointed by Governor Kate Brown to serve on the Oregon Government Ethics Commission. He was elected by his colleagues as the commission's vice chair in 2019 and its chair in 2020. His term ended in 2021.

== Political career ==
On January 31, 2022, Sosa was appointed to the Oregon House of Representatives by the Washington County Board of Commissioners.

In the 2023 legislative session, Sosa was appointed as vice chair to the House Committee on Business and Labor as well as a member of the House Committee on Higher Education; the Joint Committee on Ways and Means Subcommittee on Transportation and Economic Development; and the Joint Committee on Semiconductors. He championed bills related to consumer protection, government transparency, and higher education. He also led the effort to expand the authority of the Oregon Government Ethics Commission to enforce public meetings laws.

In the 2024 legislative session, Sosa was a chief sponsor of the Family Financial Protection Act. The bill strengthened protections for consumers under the Unfair Debt Collection Practices Act. It also increased the amount of assets that are protected from debt collection.

In the 2025 legislative session, Sosa served as chair of the House Committee on Commerce and Consumer Protection and a member of the House Committee on Housing and Homelessness. He was a champion for consumer protection. He led the fight for the Fairness & Affordability in Residential (FAIR) Energy Act to limit the rise of residential gas and electrical bills by requiring the Public Utility Commission to consider consumer interests when evaluating requests for rate increases from investor-owned utilities. He advanced a bill to crack down on bait-and-switch financing tactics used by automotive dealers. He brought a bill to add text messaging to existing robocall and telemarketing laws, prohibit solicitations late in the evenings, and ban solicitors from contacting someone more than three times in 24 hours. He teamed up with other legislators to eliminate hidden fees in online sales. He also led the effort in the House to remove medical debt from consumer credit reports. In addition, he championed a bill to address age discrimination in job applications by banning employers from asking for an applicant's age or date of graduation.

In the 2026 legislative session, Sosa was chief sponsor of a bill to stop online lenders from using a loophole in federal law to charge triple-digit interest rates on consumer loans in Oregon, which violate the state’s interest-rate cap of 36%. He was also one of the lawmakers who worked to pass a bill to ban the sale of “speculative tickets” that the seller does not possess.

== Electoral history ==
2022 Oregon State Representative, 30th district
Party	Candidate	Votes	%
Democratic	Nathan Sosa	15,572	61.7
Republican	Joe Everton	9,632	38.2
Write-in		34	0.1
Total votes		25,238	100%

2024 Oregon State Representative, 30th district
Party	Candidate	Votes	%
Democratic	Nathan Sosa	20,254	96.4
Write-in		750	3.6
Total votes		21,004	100%
