= Tuality Forest Grove Hospital =

- Tuality Healthcare
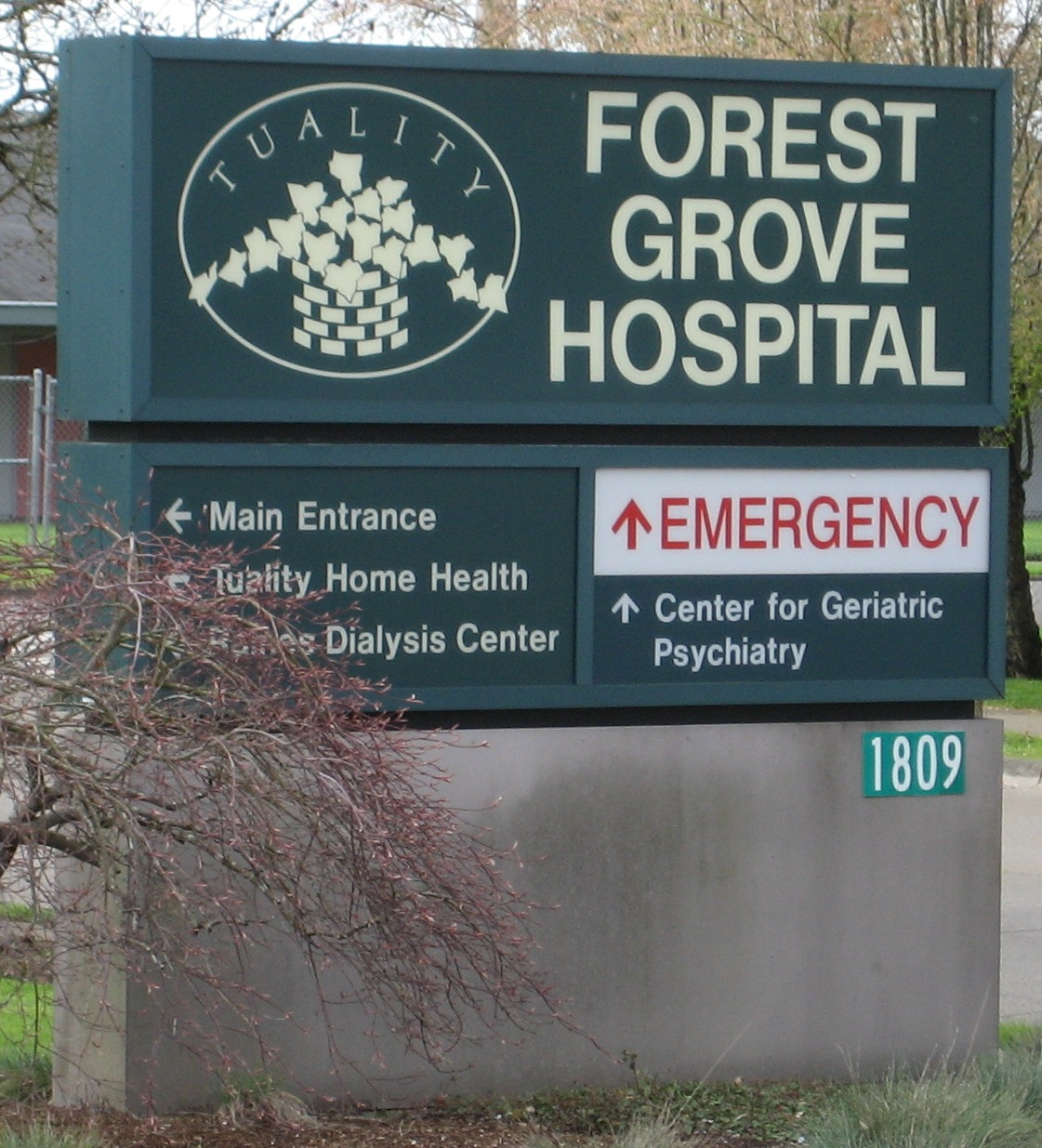
- Historic image: Old entrance sign to hospital.

Geography
- Location: Forest Grove, Oregon, United States
- Coordinates: 45°31′04″N 123°05′25″W

Organization
- Type: general

History
- Opened: 1963

Links
- Website: http://www.tuality.org
- Lists: Hospitals in Oregon

Tuality Forest Grove Hospital is licensed as a hospital in Forest Grove, Oregon, United States, but does not operate as an inpatient care service. Built in 1963, the facility had 48 beds and employed approximately 100 healthcare professionals.

== History ==
Construction on a hospital began in 1962. In 1963, the $412,000 facility opened as Forest Grove Community Hospital. The hospital founders sold it in 1967 to a local business group, who in-turn sold the hospital again in 1976 to American Medical International. Forest Grove's hospital was then remodeled and updated at that time, with a new $450,000 wing added that brought capacity to 48 beds in January 1977. In 1978, a new delivery area opened to allow entire labor-delivery-recovery-postpartum process to occur in a single room.

In 1982, a medical office building was built on the campus and the hospital was purchased by Tuality Community Hospital in neighboring Hillsboro, Oregon. After the purchase, the ownership group created Fontus in 1983 as a healthcare organization. In 1990, the hospital was renamed as Tuality Forest Grove Hospital. In 1995, a geriatric psychiatric unit was added to the facility, and in 1999 a dialysis unit opened. The maternity unit was discontinued in 1996 as part of a re-organization of the parent company. The hospital announced plans in July 2013 to expand the facility by 75 beds and add a parking structure. The long-term expansion plans would add wings to the existing structure and add a fourth floor.

The geriatric psychiatric unit was closed in March 2018 due to a failure to meet safety requirements. All employees were given no notice and let go within a week of the notice.

The emergency room transitioned to an urgent care clinic on July 1, 2018 to better serve the Forest Grove community by providing a more appropriate level of care, easier access and shorter wait times. The RN staff were given a two-week notice. The Urgent care now runs with minimal staff and no RN's

== Facility ==
Tuality Forest Grove Hospital is owned and operated by Tuality Healthcare.

== See also ==
- List of hospitals in Portland, Oregon
- List of hospitals in Oregon
