= Oregon's 30th House district =

Legislative districts in the state of Oregon

Oregon's 30th House district after redistricting after the 2020 Census

District 30 of the Oregon House of Representatives is one of 60 House legislative districts in the state of Oregon. As of 2021, the district is located entirely within Washington County and includes Rockcreek, Helvetia, and West Union as well as eastern Hillsboro and the Hillsboro Airport. The current representative for the district is Democrat Nathan Sosa.

== Election results ==
District boundaries have changed over time. Therefore, representatives before 2021 may not represent the same constituency as today. General election results from 2000 to present are as follows:

Year	Candidate	Party	Percent	Opponent	Party	Percent	Opponent	Party	Percent	Write-in percentage
2000	Dan Doyle	Republican	63.40%	Colby McCormick	Democratic	36.60%	No third candidate			
2002	Derrick Kitts	Republican	48.81%	Aron Carleson	Democratic	47.80%	John McCartney	Libertarian	3.37%	0.02%
2004	Derrick Kitts	Republican	54.93%	Mik Sander	Democratic	42.07%	Scott Semrau	Constitution	3.00%	
2006	David Edwards	Democratic	56.43%	Everett Curry	Republican	41.37%	Ken Cunningham	Constitution	2.03%	0.17%
2008	David Edwards	Democratic	55.59%	Andy Duyck	Republican	41.75%	Ken Cunningham	Constitution	2.48%	0.19%
2010	Shawn Lindsay	Republican	53.29%	Doug Ainge	Democratic	46.46%	No third candidate			0.25%
2012	Joe Gallegos	Democratic	49.44%	Shawn Lindsay	Republican	44.60%	Kyle Markley	Libertarian	5.79%	0.17%
2014	Joe Gallegos	Democratic	50.00%	Dan Mason	Republican	40.85%	Kyle Markley	Libertarian	8.92%	0.24%
2016	Janeen Sollman	Democratic	52.22%	Dan Mason	Republican	39.07%	Kyle Markley	Libertarian	8.51%	0.21%
2018	Janeen Sollman	Democratic	61.67%	Dorothy Merritt	Republican	30.48%	Kyle Markley	Libertarian	7.73%	0.12%
2020	Janeen Sollman	Democratic	93.18%	Unopposed						6.82%
2022	Nathan Sosa (Note: Nathan Sosa was the incumbent in this election. She was appointed to this seat on February 1, 2022 to replace Janeen Sollman, who resigned to take an appointment to the Oregon State Senate.)	Democratic	61.70%	Joe Everton	Republican	38.16%	No third candidate			0.13%
2024	Nathan Sosa	Democratic	96.4%	Unopposed						3.6%

== See also ==
- Oregon Legislative Assembly
- Oregon House of Representatives
