= Hamby Park =

Park in Hillsboro, Oregon, United States

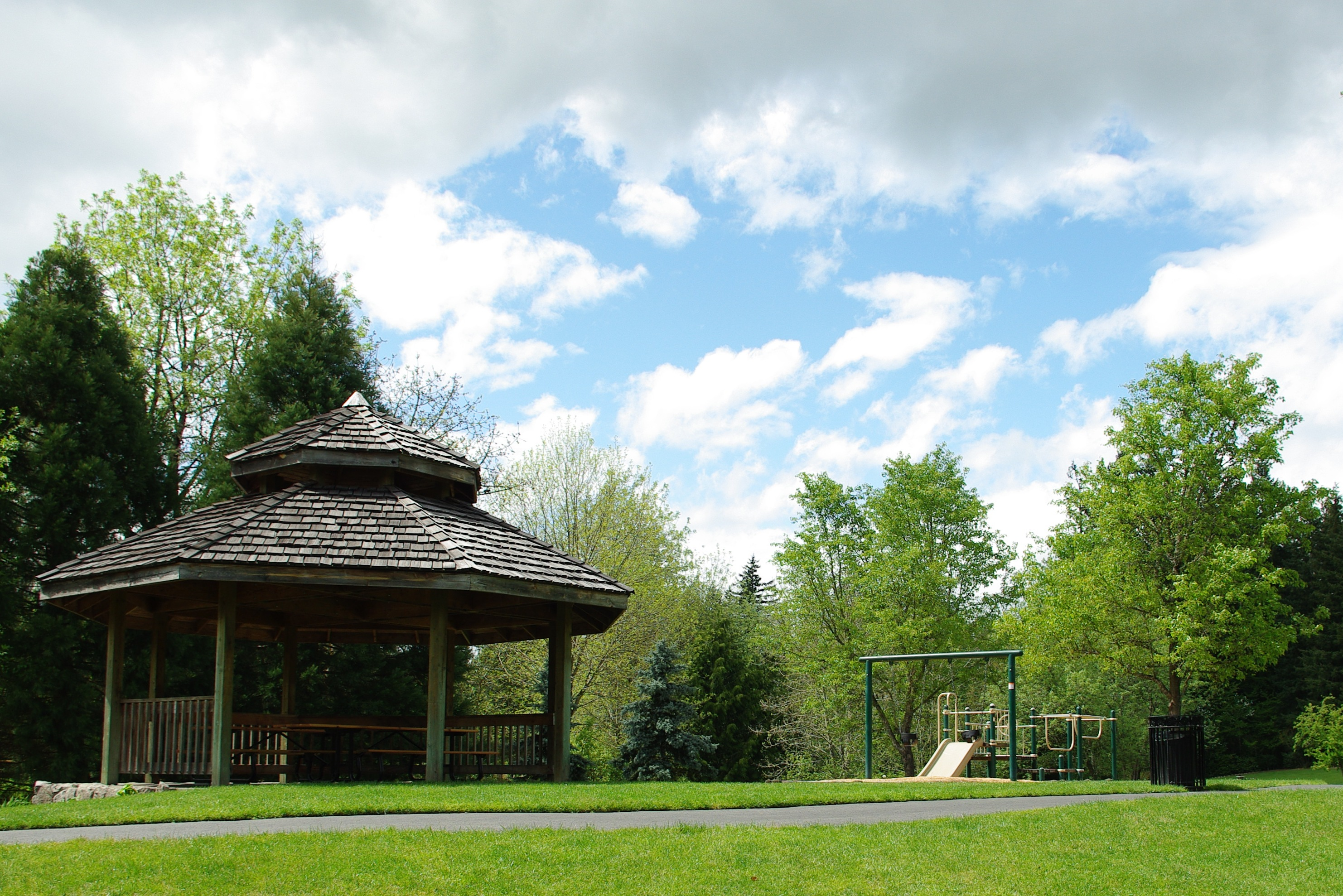
- Gazebo in the park
- Interactive map of Hamby Park
- Type: Public, city
- Location: Hillsboro, Oregon; United States
- Coordinates: 45°32′1″N 122°58′59″W
- Area: 6.7 acres (27,000 m^{2})
- Created: 1990
- Operator: Hillsboro Parks & Recreation Department
- Status: open
- Website: U.J. Hamby Park

U. J. Hamby Park is a nearly seven acre municipal park in northwest Hillsboro, Oregon, United States. Opened in 1990, the park includes nature trails along a small creek as well as a basketball court and grass lawn. The park is named after the longtime Chevrolet dealership owner, whose family donated the land to the city in 1986. The natural portion of the park includes wetlands and woodlands.

== History ==
Eugene Hamby, the son of Ulin J. Hamby, donated three acres to the city of Hillsboro in 1986. U. J. Hamby was the longtime owner of the Chevrolet car dealership in Hillsboro and father-in-law of then state legislator Jeannette Hamby. In May 1989, the federal government gave Hillsboro’s parks department $26,975 to develop a park on the land along Northeast Jackson School Road. The city chose the name Hamby Park at that time and construction began later that year.

Part of the funding for the park came from development fees charged by the city. Construction continued into July 1990, and the park opened later in 1990. Work on the park was not finished when it opened, and additional land was purchased by the city to add to the park. On September 13, 1995, Hillsboro officially dedicated the park in a ceremony featuring mayor Gordon Faber.

The gazebo at the park was refurbished with a new roof in 2004. In 2007, the park was the first park adopted in the city’s adopt-a-park program, with adoption coming from students of the Miller Education Center. Students from the school and volunteers from SOLV worked to remove invasive plant species and spread new barkdust at the park during a work party in October 2008. The park was one of several parks slated for improvements from a bond put to a vote by the city in November 2008, but the levy failed.

== Amenities ==
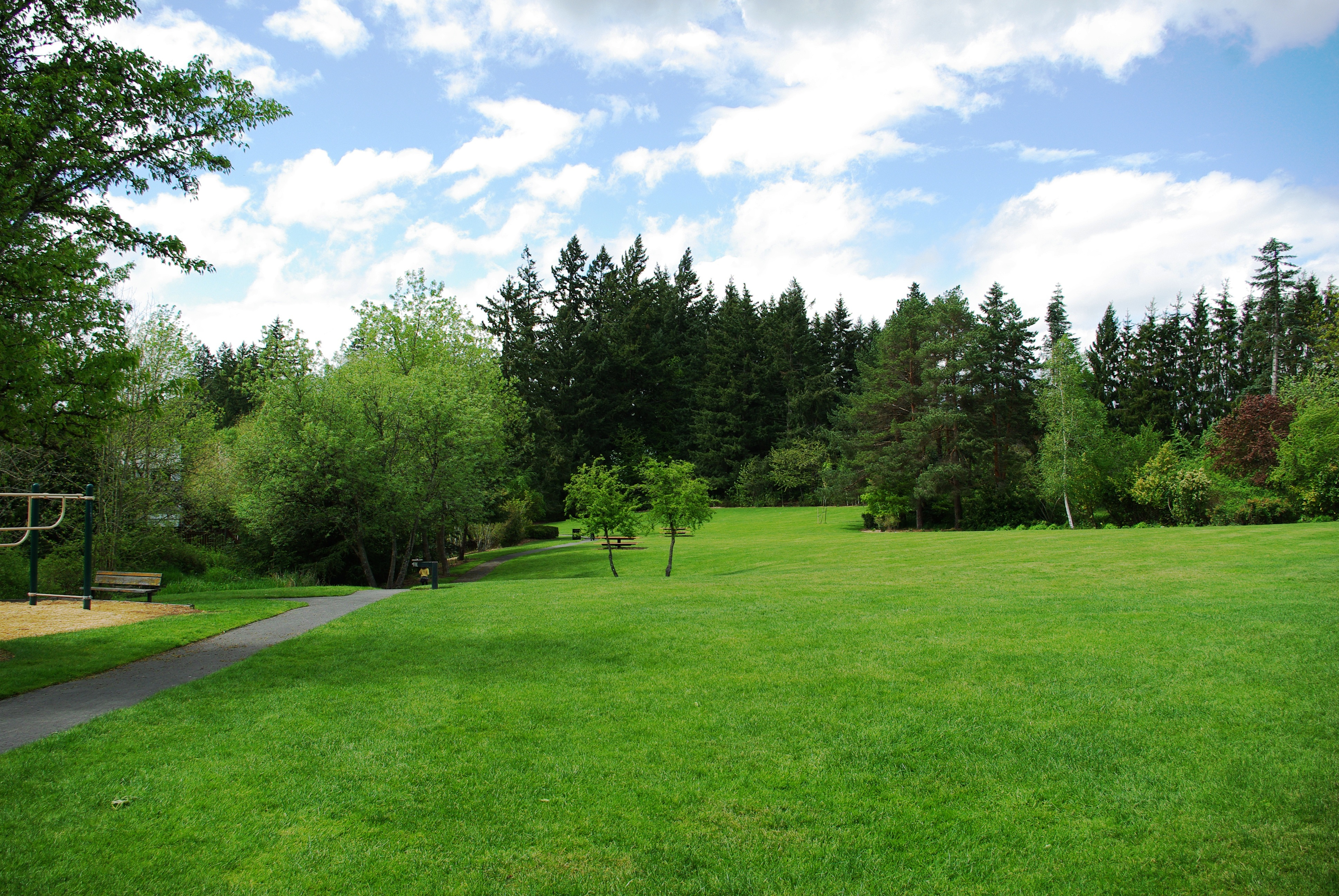
Lawn area at the park

Hamby Park sits on 6.7 acres (2.7 ha) and includes both a natural area and a developed park area. The developed portion includes a picnic shelter and tables, a playground, and a basketball court. The picnic area includes a grass lawn, and the entire park has roughly 3,000 feet (910 m) of paths through the park, with about 1,000 feet (300 m) of those paved. The park also hosts the parks department’s weekly running club, the Hillsboro Running Club, and is a stop on the annual Tour de Parks bicycle ride in Hillsboro.

The natural area is to the west of the developed portion and includes a wooded area traversed by a small creek, a tributary of McKay Creek. There are also wetlands, a ravine, and a pond in this section of the park. The area includes several bridges and trails covered with barkdust. Trees in the park include lodgepole pines, blue spruce, Pacific yews, Pacific dogwoods, western red cedars, old-growth Douglas-fir, oak, vine maple, and sequoia trees. Other flora include red huckleberry, Oregon grape, pink star flowers, stinging nettles, and other native plants. Birds at the park are Bewick's wrens, dark-eyed juncos, song sparrows, black-capped chickadees, scrub jays, and ducks among others. Animals include possums, bats, and raccoons. There is a half-mile trail through the natural section that leads to a slough.
