= Humby =

Humby may refer to:

== Places ==
- Great Humby, a village near Grantham in Lincolnshire, England;
- Little Humby, a village near Grantham in Lincolnshire, England;
- Ropsley and Humby, a civil parish in Lincolnshire, England;

== Surnames ==
- Alison Humby (born 1972), English badminton player
- Baxter Humby, Canadian kickboxer
- Dana Humby (born 1979), New Zealand association football player
- Harold Humby (1879–1923), British sport shooter
