= Hillsboro Medical Center =

- OHSU Health (formerly Tuality Healthcare)
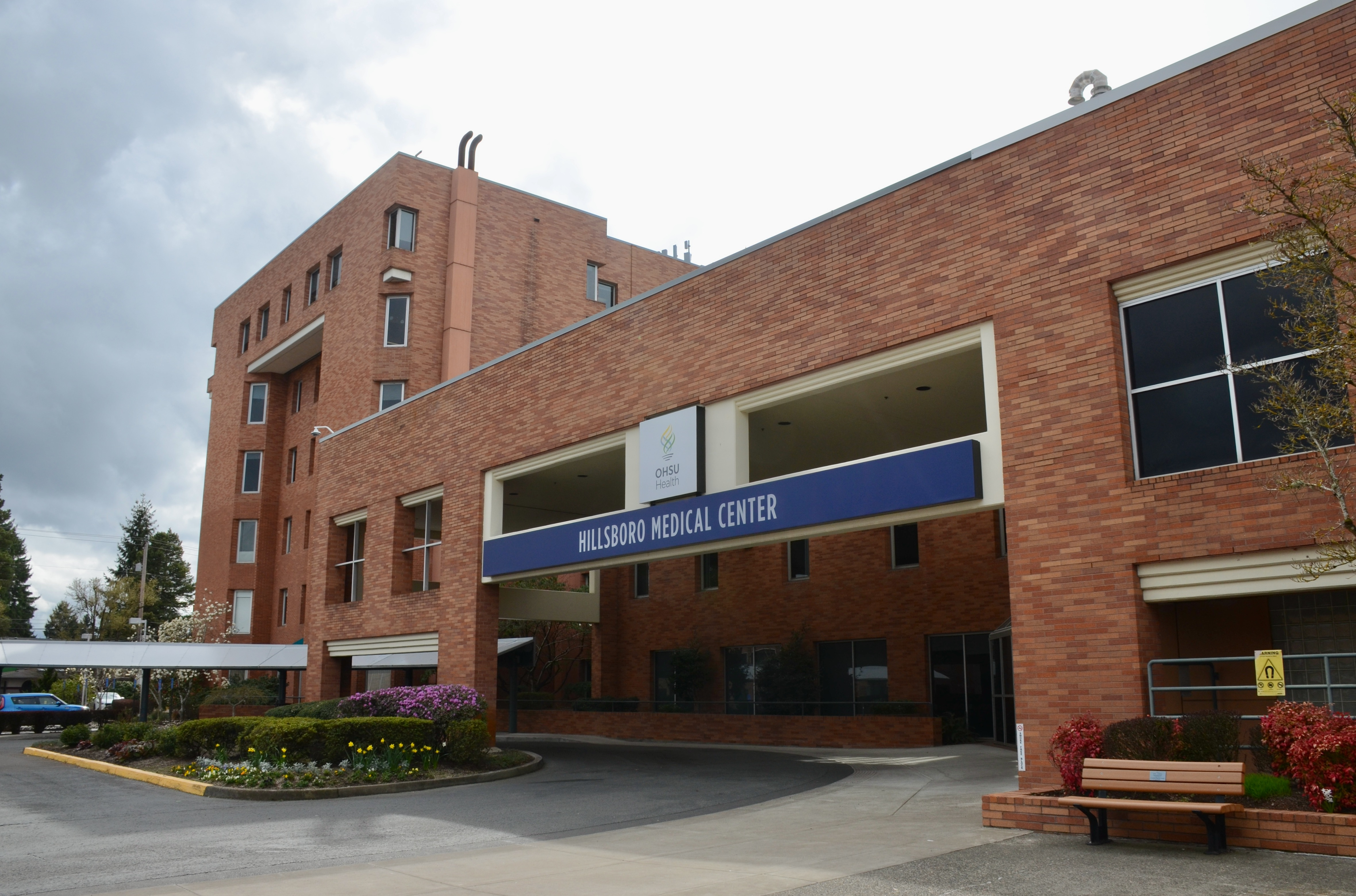
- East façade and main entrance in 2022

Geography
- Location: Hillsboro, Washington County, Oregon, United States
- Coordinates: 45.519188°N 122.978039°W

Organization
- Type: Community hospital
- Affiliated university: Oregon Health & Science University

Services
- Beds: 167

History
- Former name: Tuality Community Hospital
- Founded: 1918

Links
- Website: https://www.tuality.org
- Lists: Hospitals in Oregon

Hillsboro Medical Center, formerly Tuality Community Hospital, is a medical care facility located in Hillsboro in the U.S. state of Oregon. The 167-bed facility was founded in 1918 in downtown and is one of two hospitals in Hillsboro, Washington County's most populous city. Since 2019, it has been operated by OHSU Health, and previously had partnerships with Oregon Health & Science University and Pacific University. At six stories tall, the main building was tied for the tallest in the city with the Hillsboro Civic Center as of 2006.

== History ==
What is now Hillsboro Medical Center traces its roots back to 1918, when Minnie Jones Coy started a small six-bed home-hospital in Hillsboro at Second and Oak Streets. Two years later, the facility moved to Seventh and Oak in Hillsboro, expanded to 18 hospital beds, and was renamed Jones Hospital. In 1940, the hospital opened a new building with 28 beds. That addition included a nursery and delivery room, operating rooms, and an x-ray room. Six years later, another expansion was completed, with additional surgery areas, another delivery room, and a laboratory.

In 1952, Jones died at age 57, leaving the 74-bed hospital to her estate. Two years later, the estate sold the facility for $250,000 to a non-profit community group, who renamed it Tuality Community Hospital. The hospital was expanded again in 1960, increasing the number of beds to 84. In 1970, the building was remodeled to add an intensive care (ICU) and coronary combined unit.

In 1973, a new orange brick facility was built; with that, much of the pre-1960 building was demolished. The revamped three-story hospital had 93 beds, opened on February 17, 1973, and cost $6 million. In 1978, a fourth floor with 44 beds was added, and a year later, other sections of the building were expanded to allow for respiratory therapy, nuclear medicine, pathology, and biomedical engineering, among other services. With the 1982 purchase of Forest Grove Community Hospital in nearby Forest Grove, Oregon, the ownership group created the Fontus healthcare organization in 1983. Expansion of the hospital continued in 1985 when a fifth and sixth story were added to increase capacity to 181 hospital beds. The expansion included a new laboratory and expanded surgical and x-ray facilities.

Construction of the Tuality Health Education Center adjacent to the hospital continued expansion through 1985 and into 1986. A new birthing center was opened in May 1987 with ten single room suites for expectant mothers that were named state of the art by the American Institute of Architects. In 1988, a 20-bed Extended Care Rehabilitation Center was created within the facility, reducing the number of hospital beds to 167. In 1996, a 400 car parking structure was built at the hospital campus. Two years later, an expanded birthing facility opened and MAX Light Rail expansion included a station at the hospital. In 2002, the first open heart surgery at the hospital was performed and a cancer treatment center was opened as a joint project with Oregon Health & Science University (OHSU).

In 2003, a 129,000-square-foot (12,000 m^{2}) medical office building was finished adjacent to the hospital, with expanded doctors offices and a sky bridge to the main hospital. Tuality added eight hospitalists to the staff in 2005. In 2006, Pacific University opened their new 105,000-square-foot (9,800 m^{2}) Health Professions Campus at the Hillsboro hospital for housing its College of Health Professions. The hospital was given permission by the city to add a mid-block crosswalk on Eighth Street in 2008. The crosswalk connects the hospital building to the medical office building, and it was planned that the street would later be closed entirely to traffic on that block.

Construction began on the Hillsboro Intermodal Transit Facility in 2009, which was a joint project of Tuality Healthcare, Pacific University, and the city that added additional parking along with facilities to support bicycle use. The facility opened in September 2010. In August 2010, the area around the campus became part of Hillsboro's Health and Education District. The hospital earned an A rating in December 2012 for safety from the Leapfrog Group.

In November 2019, Tuality Healthcare announced that it was changing the hospital's name to Hillsboro Medical Center, to better reflect its relationship with OHSU, three years after the two entities established a clinical partnership.

== Facility ==
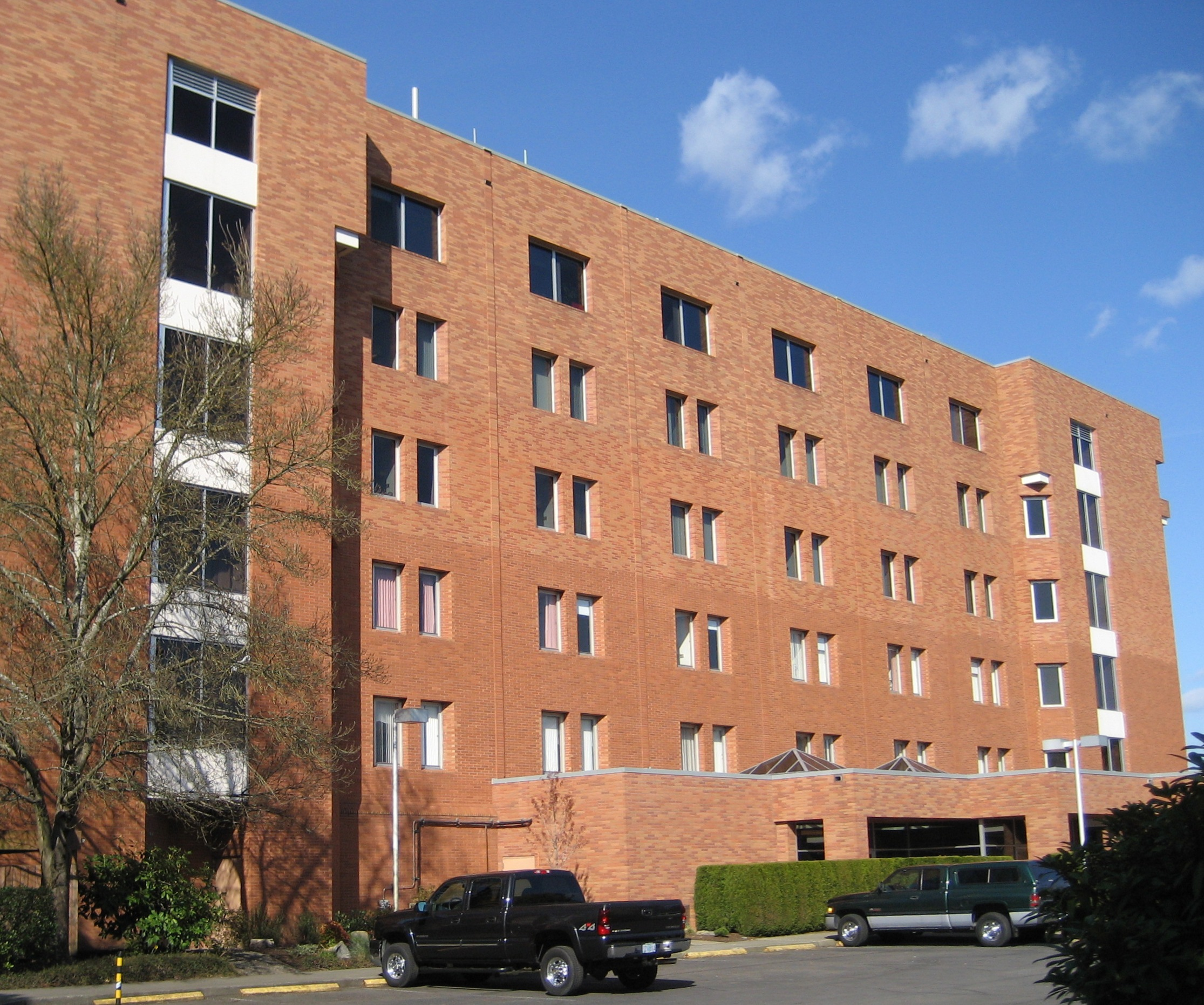
South side of the building in 2007

Hillsboro Medical Center is located in a six-story orange-brick building in downtown Hillsboro between Tualatin Valley Highway. The facility contains a department of nuclear medicine, a cardiac intensive care unit, a special skilled nursing ward for rehabilitation of long-term injuries, an obstetrics unit, department of orthopedics, department of neurology, a cardiology department, and emergency care. Additionally, there is a private heliport for transporting patients to and from the facility. Tuality Hospital contained a 22-bed short-term skilled nursing unit, but this unit was closed in 2003.

The hospital discharges 7,287 patients annually with a total of 28,908 patient days of hospitalization. Quality indicators for 2005 include: average heart attack death rate, average balloon angioplasty death rate, average heart bypass surgery death rate, average gastro intestinal hemorrhage death rate, average congestive heart failure death rate, average hip fracture death rate, average stroke death rate, and average pneumonia death rate. Hillsboro Medical Center is accredited by the Joint Commission on Accreditation of Health Care Organizations (JCAHO) and the College of American Pathologists.

== Tuality Healthcare ==
Hillsboro Medical Center is operated by Tuality Healthcare. Tuality Healthcare is a not for profit, community healthcare organization that operates one other hospital, a health foundation, medical plazas, urgent care centers, an education center, and various other medical offices. It became a partner with Oregon Health & Science University in 2016.

== See also ==
- List of hospitals in Portland, Oregon
