= Tuality Healthcare =

US healthcare organization

Coordinates: 45.51973°N 122.97948°W

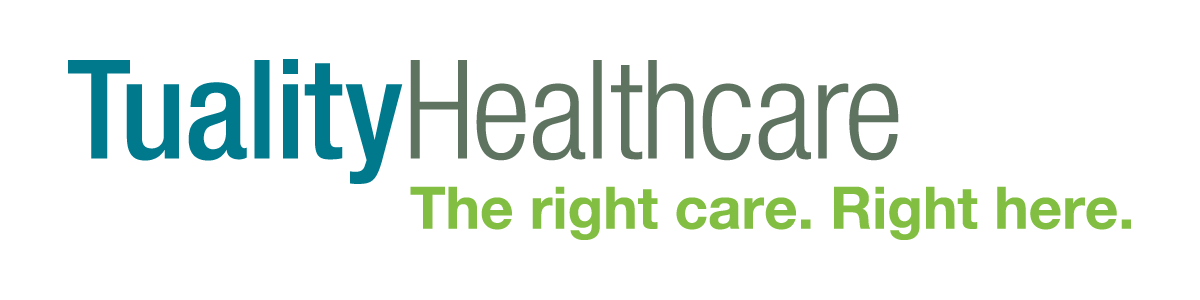
- Company type: not-for-profit healthcare, not-for-profit hospitals
- Industry: Healthcare
- Founded: 1918; 108 years ago
- Headquarters: Hillsboro, Oregon
- Key people: Lori James-Nielsen, President
- Revenue: 1,979,663 United States dollar (2022)
- Total assets: 11,162,813 United States dollar (2022)
- Website: tuality.org

Tuality Healthcare is a non-profit, community health care organization based in Hillsboro, Oregon, United States. Founded in 1918, the organization operates a medical center in Washington County, Oregon, and has been selected on several occasions as one of Oregon’s 100 Best Companies to Work For by Oregon Business magazine.

== History ==
Tuality Healthcare's beginning starts in 1918 when Minnie Jones Coy started a small hospital in Hillsboro. Over the next 65 years that hospital expanded to nearly 100 hospital beds, and in 1982 purchased an additional hospital in Forest Grove, Oregon. Then in 1983 the community ownership group formed Fontus as a healthcare organization. This organization comprised the two hospitals and the Tuality Medical Foundation.

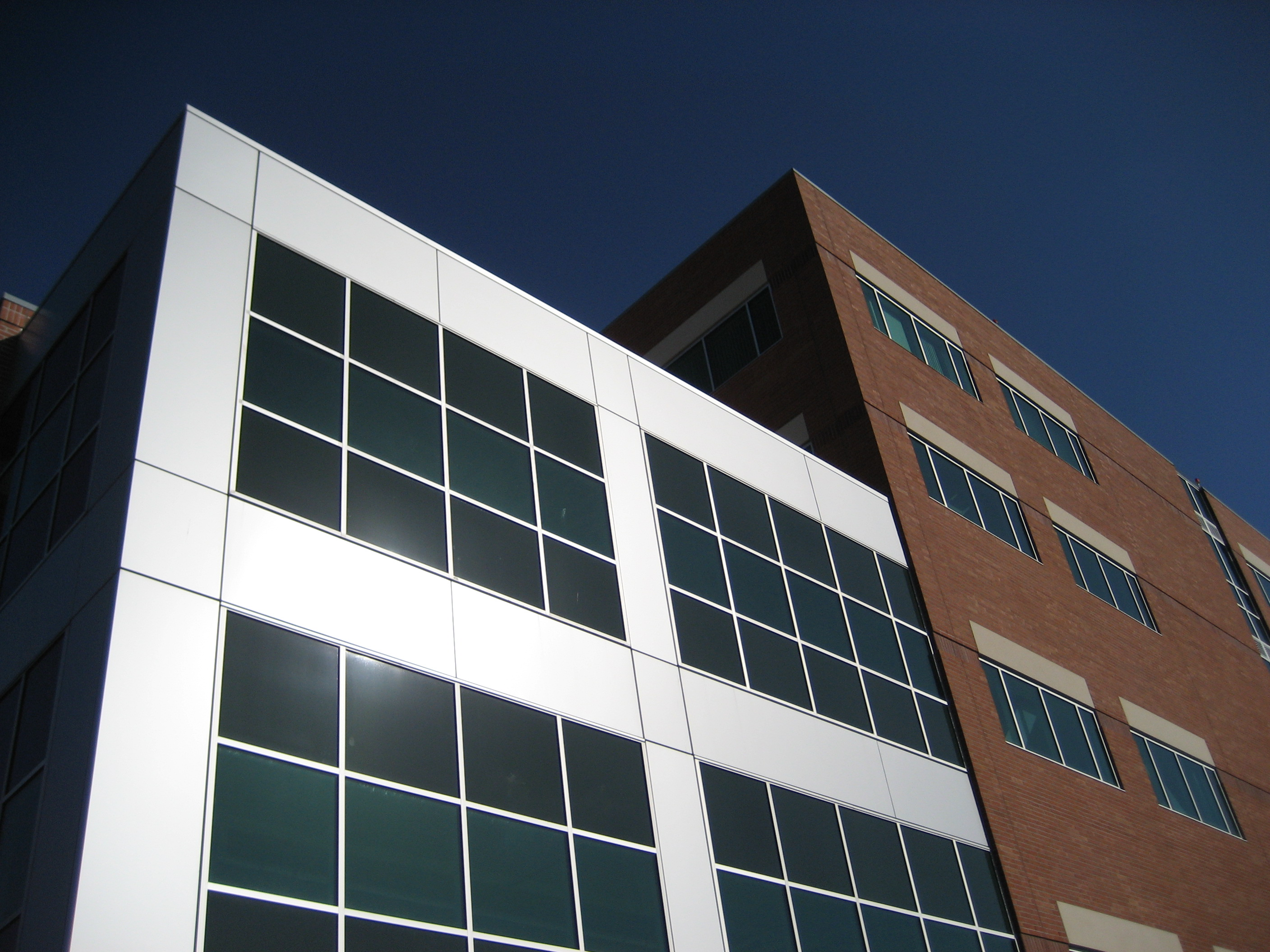
Tuality medical office building in Hillsboro.

In 1986, the group built the Tuality Health Education Center at the Hillsboro campus, followed by the Tuality Health Information Resource Center in 1988. Then in 1992 Tuality Healthcare finished a 34,000-square-foot (3,200 m^{2}) medical office building in Hillsboro. In 1994, Tuality Health Alliance is formed, and in 2000 Tuality and Oregon Health Sciences University form a partnership to expand cancer treatment in Washington County with the facility opened in 2002.

Tuality sold off its stake in the Tanasbourne Health Center in 2004 after a dispute with partner Providence Health & Services over the later's attempt to build a hospital in Hillsboro. The facility includes an urgent care clinic and doctor's offices. In both 2004 and 2005 the group was named one of the 100 Best Companies to work for in Oregon. In 2006, Tuality, in partnership with Pacific University, opened Pacific's Health Professions Campus at Tuality's downtown Hillsboro campus. Regence BlueCross BlueShield announced in May 2012 that some of its members would be moved to plans that would utilize Tuality's provider network. In October of that year an affiliation with former partner Providence Health & Services was announced that was to be a trial program.

== Groups and facilities ==
Tuality operates the following healthcare facilities: Tuality Community Hospital, Tuality Urgent Care, Tuality Forest Grove Hospital, Tuality/OHSU Cancer Center, and other medical offices in western Washington County. It also operates the Tuality Health Education Center, which includes a library that is a member of the Washington County Cooperative Library Services.

Inpatient services offered by Tuality Healthcare at these facilities include: cancer treatment, cardiac related services, a critical care center and Tuality Community Hospital, surgical services, geriatric psychiatry, and birth and maternity care. Outpatient care includes diagnostic imaging, infusion services, laboratory testing, rehabilitation, breast health care, and urgent and emergency care.

Additionally, Tuality operates the Tuality Healthcare Foundation, Tuality Health Information Resource Center, Tuality Health Alliance, and the Tuality Health Education Center. The Health Alliance is a healthcare provider network with participation mainly in the Portland, Oregon metropolitan area.

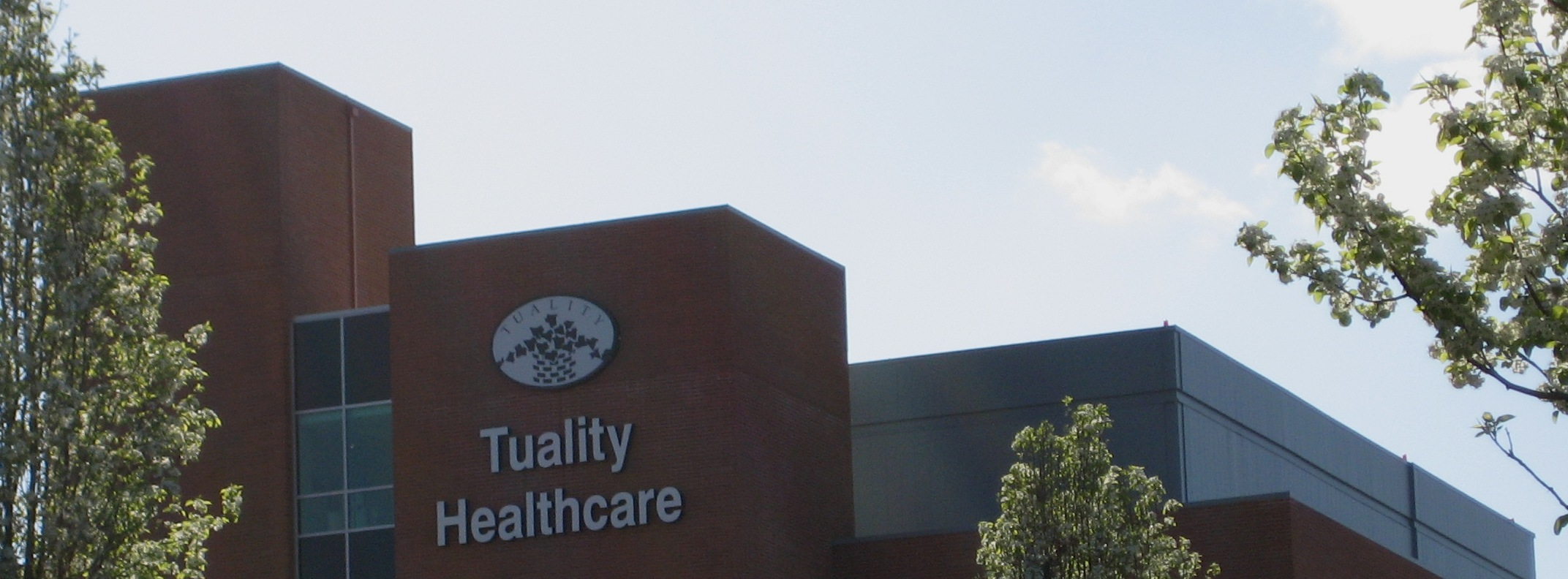

Tuality operates 215 total hospital beds with 13 full-time physicians, 123 registered nurses, 6 pharmacists, and approximately 600 other medical and non-medical personnel. All facilities generate a total annual revenue of $284.2 million. They are accredited by the Joint Commission on Accreditation of Health Care Organizations (JCAHO) and the College of American Pathologists.

== Affiliations ==
On August 18, 2015, Tuality Healthcare and Oregon Health & Science University (OHSU) signed a letter of intent (LOI) to pursue an affiliation that would integrate Tuality's clinical enterprise with OHSU's health care enterprise. An agreement was finalized in February 2016, which called for Tuality's clinical operations to be managed by OHSU, under the strategic direction of a new company called OHSU Partners.

== See also ==
- List of hospitals in Portland, Oregon
