= Miller Education Center =

Oak Street Campus
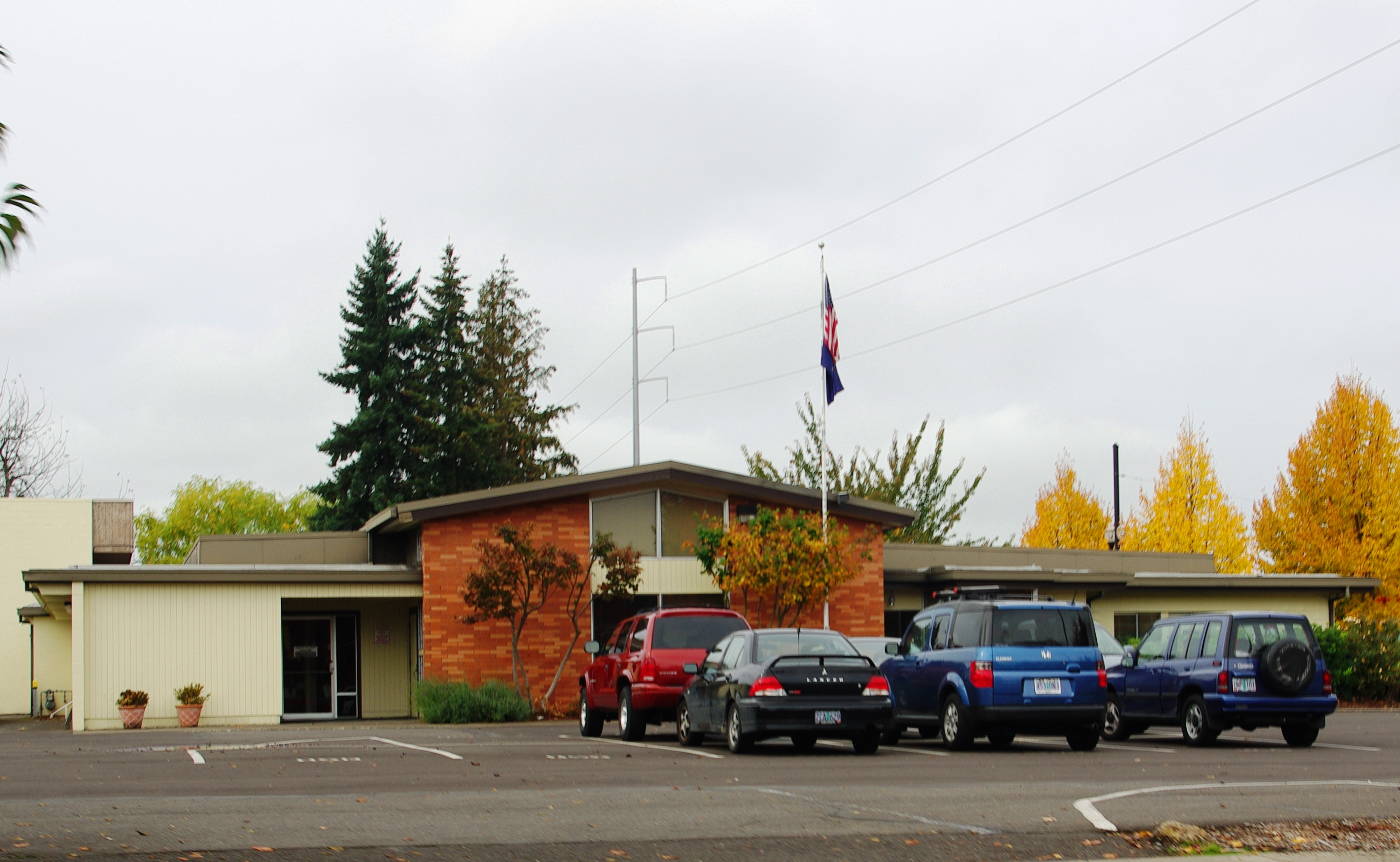
- Oak Street Campus East

Location
- 440 SE Oak St; Hillsboro, OR 97123
- Coordinates: 45.5210824°N 122.9815042°W

Information
- School type: Public, high school Public middle school
- School district: Hillsboro School District 1J
- Principal: Amy Torres
- Grades: 7-12
- Enrollment: 70 (2012-2013)
- Language: English
- Campus: Suburban
- Website: hsd.k12.or.us/miller/index.html

Oak Street Campus is an alternative school in Hillsboro, Oregon, United States. Part of the Hillsboro School District, it features programs that include two alternative high schools and a middle school. The school opened in 1987, and in 2001 moved from leased space on Enterprise Circle to the school district's former administrative buildings in downtown at Sixth and Washington and Seventh and Washington. The school currently has five locations in Hillsboro, offering nine different programs for grades 7–12. One of the programs is Food Education And Sustainability Training (FEAST), which provides vocational training in food preparation and related areas. The school adopted Hamby Park through the city's adopt-a-park program and donate time cleaning the park.
