= David Edwards (Oregon politician) =

American politician (born 1966)

Member of the Oregon House of Representatives from the 30th district
- In office 2007–2010
- Preceded by: Derrick Kitts
- Succeeded by: Shawn Lindsay

Personal details
- Born: David W. Edwards; 1966 (age 59–60) Las Vegas, Nevada
- Party: Democratic
- Spouse: Michelle
- Education: University of Southern California, University of Oregon
- Occupation: Business owner

David W. Edwards (born 1966) is a former Democratic member of the Oregon House of Representatives, representing District 30 from 2007 to 2010. He graduated Hillsboro High School and earned bachelor's and master's degrees in English literature from the University of Southern California and a master's in public affairs from the University of Oregon. Edwards attended the University of Southern California's film school and turned to filmmaking after leaving the legislature, writing, directing and producing a supernatural thriller, Nightscape. He also produced a tie-in video game, Nightscape: Phantom Fast Racing, available via iTunes and an original Nightscape novel, Nightscape: The Dreams of Devils. Edwards is also the founder and former CEO of Zanthus, a marketing research company in Portland, Oregon.

== Electoral history ==
2006 Oregon State Representative, 30th district
Party	Candidate	Votes	%
Democratic	David Edwards	12,253	56.5
Republican	Everett Curry	8,965	41.3
Constitution	Ken Cunningham	442	2.0
Write-in		38	0.2
Total votes		21,698	100%

2008 Oregon State Representative, 30th district
Party	Candidate	Votes	%
Democratic	David Edwards	15,878	55.6
Republican	Andy Duyck	11,925	41.7
Constitution	Ken Cunningham	709	2.5
Write-in		53	0.2
Total votes		28,565	100%
