= List of people from Hillsboro, Oregon =

The following is a partial list of notable residents, past and present, from Hillsboro, Oregon, United States. A separate list of people from Oregon is available.

== Mayors ==
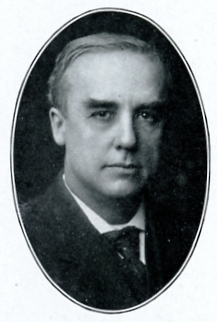
Samuel Huston

- Harry T. Bagley
- William N. Barrett
- Steve Callaway
- Benjamin P. Cornelius
- Rodolph Crandall
- Miller M. Duris
- Gordon Faber
- Joseph C. Hare
- William D. Hare
- Shirley Huffman
- Tom Hughes
- Samuel B. Huston
- Thomas H. Tongue
- Charles T. Tozier

== Athletes ==
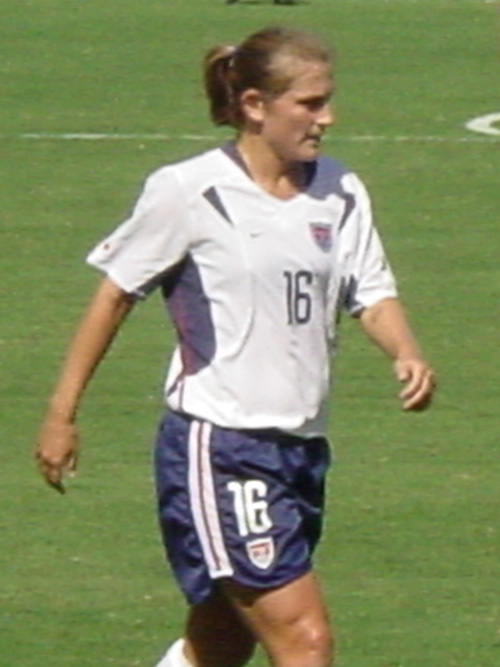
Tiffeny Milbret

- Erik Ainge, football player
- Wally Backman, World Series champion with the Mets, baseball player
- Bob Beall, baseball player
- Scott Brosius, baseball player
- Scott Brow, baseball player who won the 1993 World Series with the Toronto Blue Jays
- Jim Evenson, football player
- Thomas Garrigus, Olympic shooting athlete
- Darrall Imhoff, basketball player
- Josh Inman, Olympic rower
- Scott Kozak, football player
- Mitch Meeuwsen, football player
- Tiffeny Milbrett, soccer player
- Vern Olsen, baseball player
- Ben Petrick, baseball player
- Roddy Piper, professional wrestler
- Clifford R. Robinson, basketball player
- Scott Rueck, women's basketball coach
- Ad Rutschman, Hall of Fame football coach
- Wes Schulmerich, baseball player

== Politicians ==
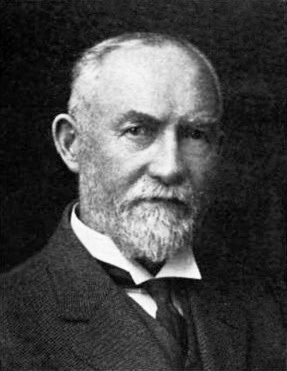
James Withycombe

- George R. Bagley, lawyer and judge
- Rick Dancer, politician and news anchor
- Leon S. Davis, politician
- George W. Ebbert, pioneer
- David Edwards, politician who served in the Oregon House
- Daniel Gault, educator, newspaperman, and state legislator
- William G. Hare, politician
- H. T. Hesse, politician
- David Hill, pioneer and city namesake
- Derrick Kitts, politician who served in the Oregon House
- Shawn Lindsay, attorney and politician
- George W. Patterson, politician
- Paul L. Patterson, former Oregon governor
- D. O. Quick, state legislator
- Edward Schulmerich, banker and politician
- Samuel Thurston, first Congressional delegate from Oregon
- Thomas Tongue, former Oregon Supreme Court justice
- William H. Wehrung, politician and businessman
- James Withycombe, former Oregon governor

== Others ==
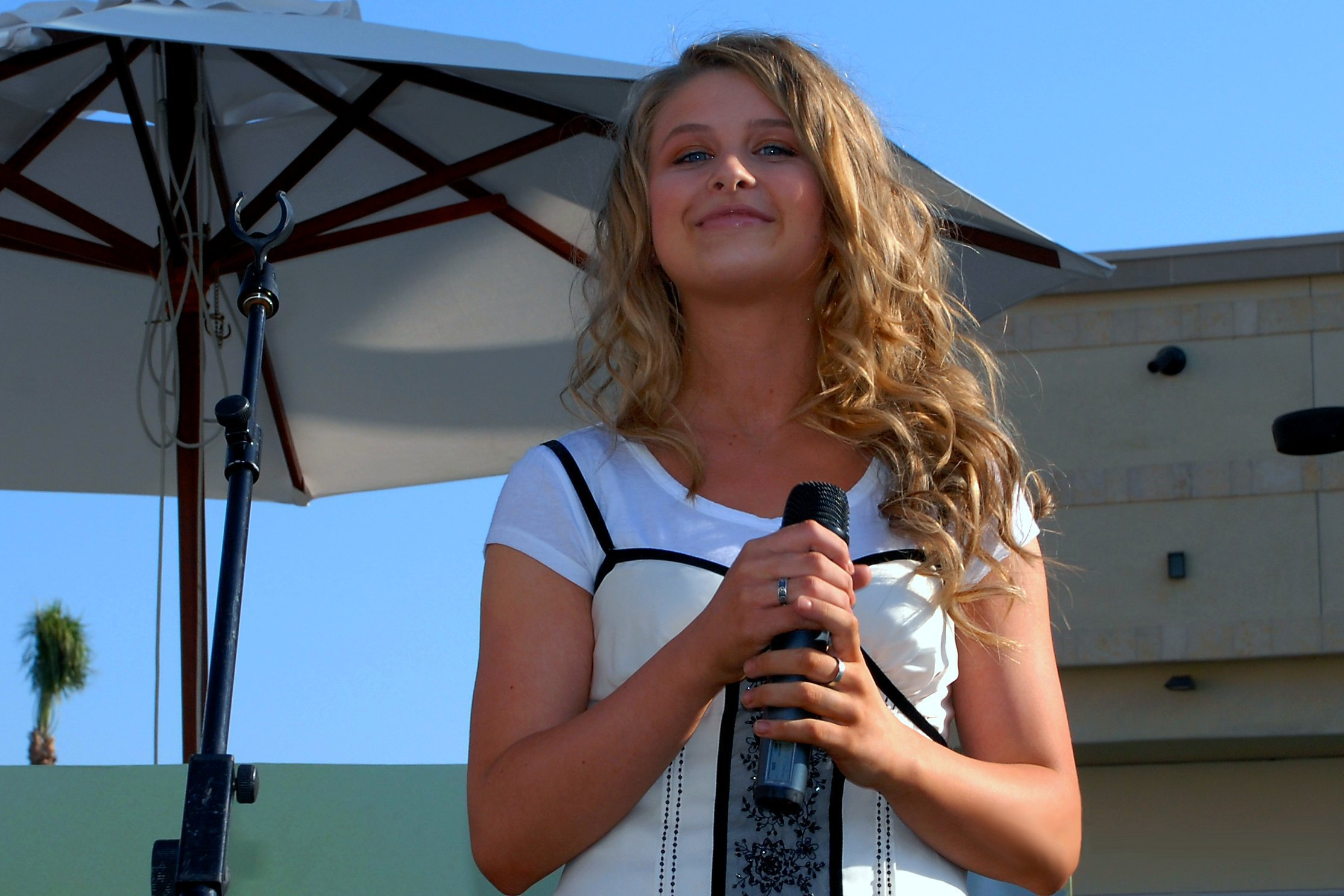
Savannah Outen

- Kelly AuCoin, actor
- Cesar Barone, serial killer
- Genevieve Bell, anthropologist for Intel
- Peggy Y. Fowler, CEO of Portland General Electric
- Judi Hofer, businessperson
- David Larsen, actor
- Savannah Outen, singer
- Tommy Overstreet, country music singer
- Norman Ralston, aviator
- John W. Shute, banker
- Albert E. Tozier, journalist
- Mary Ramsey Wood, "Mother Queen of Oregon"
- Bryce Zabel, writer/producer, former chairman of the Academy of Television Arts & Sciences

== See also ==
- Lists of Oregon-related topics
