= Hillsboro Transit Center =

Light rail station in Hillsboro, US

Hillsboro Central/SE 3rd Ave TC
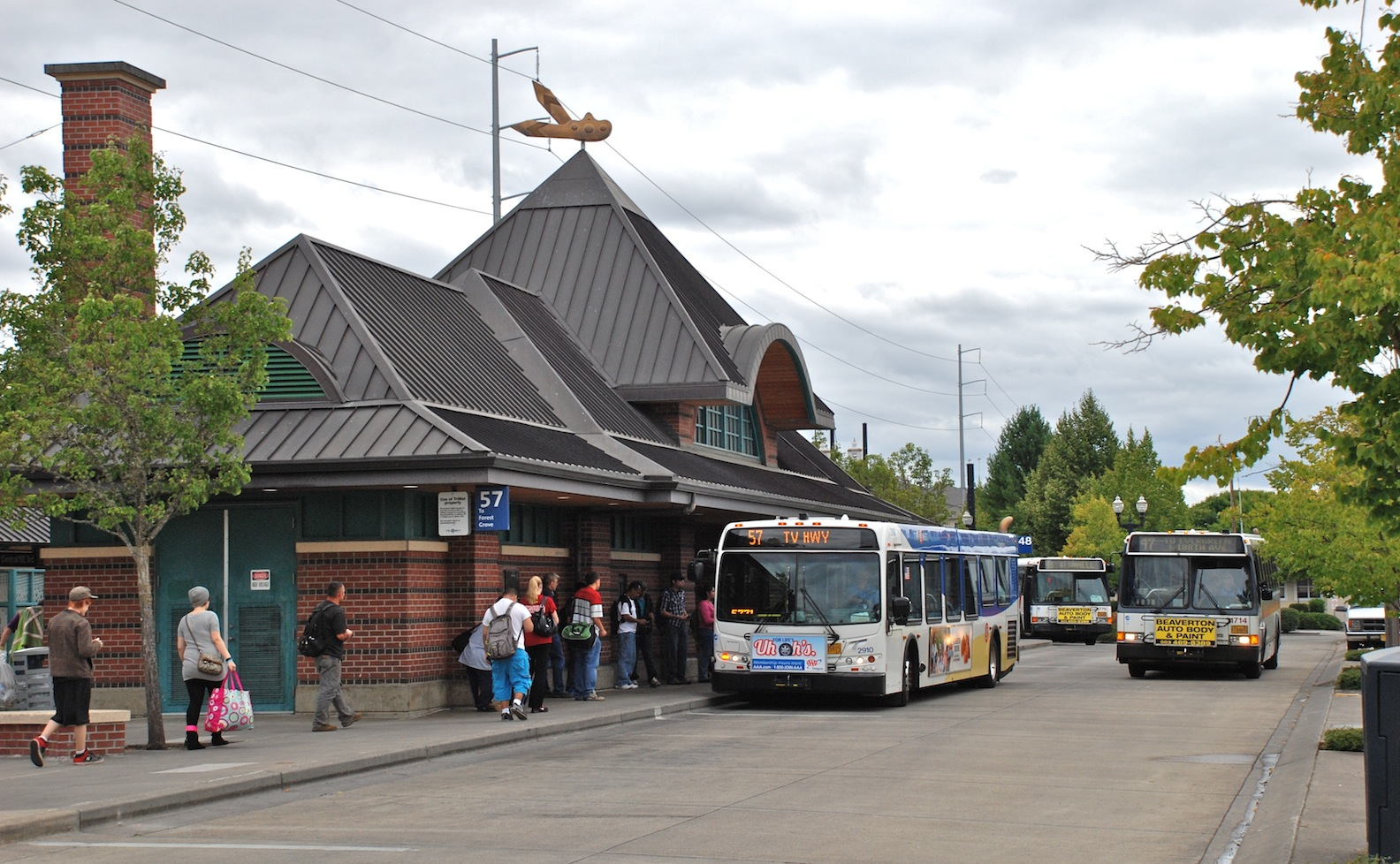

General information
- Location: 333 SE Washington St; Hillsboro, Oregon; USA
- Coordinates: 45°31′17″N 122°59′07″W
- Owner: TriMet
- Platforms: 1 island platform
- Tracks: 2
- Bus routes: TriMet: 46, 47, 48, 57; Yamhill County Transit: 33
- Bus operators: TriMet and Yamhill County Transit

Construction
- Parking: None
- Cycle facilities: bicycle lockers

History
- Opened: September 12, 1998

Services
Preceding station	TriMet	Following station
Hatfield Government Center Terminus	Blue Line	Hillsboro Health District toward Cleveland Ave
Location

Hillsboro Central/Southeast 3rd Avenue Transit Center, also known as Hillsboro Transit Center, is a light rail station and transit center on the MAX Blue Line in Hillsboro, Oregon. Opened in 1998, the red-brick station is the 19th stop westbound on the Westside MAX, one stop from the western terminus of the line. Physically the largest station on the line, it is located at a former stop of the Oregon Electric Railway and includes artwork honoring the history of the community.

== History ==
Construction of the Westside MAX project began in 1994, while construction on the Hillsboro Central station was completed in August 1998, with a ceremony held on August 13. On September 12, 1998, Hillsboro Central opened along with the Westside MAX line. By 1999, the station was the third busiest on the westside line.

In 2000, a plaque honoring former Hillsboro mayor Shirley Huffman's work getting the westside MAX extended from 185th Avenue to downtown Hillsboro was added to the station. Huffman lobbied federal officials to extend the line into downtown Hillsboro, including lecturing the Federal Transit Administration's leader. When Hillsboro Central opened, the Hillsboro Public Library operated a small branch at the station called Books by Rail, which was the only library on the West Coast located at a mass transit station. Because of budget cuts in the library system, the branch was closed in June 2003; in October 2003 TriMet began letting the Hillsboro Police Department use the space for its bicycle patrol. In March 2011, TriMet received a federal grant to pay for the installation of security cameras at the station.

== Details ==
Located on Southeast Washington Street between Third and Fourth avenues in downtown Hillsboro, the station is decorated with dark red bricks. Overhead is a steep-pitched roof, with the station's floor in the vestibule built of concrete planks in homage to the cedar-planked roads that formerly existed in the town. Designed by the architectural firm OTAK Inc., the station is the largest of the MAX stations on the westside line as it extends most of the length of the block between Third and Fourth avenues. Hillsboro Central sits on the same site of the old Oregon Electric Railway station for the Hillsboro area and has a station building that is designed to look like an old railroad station with features similar to those at a Grand Central Station type of facility.

Other features include false chimneys and copper roofing on the main building that serves as the passenger shelter for people waiting for buses or westbound MAX trains. There is also a passenger cover on the single island platform between the two tracks and an additional cover for waiting bus passengers. Hillsboro Central has bike lockers and is handicapped-accessible, but does not have a park-and-ride lot. The station is a hub for bus services in Hillsboro and connections to Cornelius and Forest Grove to the west. This station is served by the following bus lines: 46-North Hillsboro, 47-Main/Baseline, 48-Cornell, and 57-TV Hwy/Forest Grove.

=== Art ===
"I seen more drunk men on the grounds than all the rest put together"

— Albert E. Tozier quote etched on glass

A variety of public artwork adorns the brick station. The collective works, entitled Niches, are a montage of the everyday lives of residents. Inspiration and materials for the artwork were collected from the Washington County Museum, the Washington County Fair, and the Oregon Historical Society. Bill Will, Fernanda D'Agostino, Valerie Otani, and Jerry Mayer were the artists responsible for the theme at the station.

Items include granite pavers that have memories of past Hillsboro citizens carved into the stone and photographs etched onto glass. Photographs range from pioneer times to life in the 1990s. There are also letters etched in glass from people such as Albert E. Tozier, Robert Summer, Chavela Mendoza, Lester C. Mooberry, Mary Ramsey Wood, George Iwasaki, and Howard Vollum. Gunfights, hangings, funerals, the internment of Japanese Americans during World War II, the Great Depression, and an outbreak of diphtheria in the 1890s are among the events represented. More recent photographs show the defunct Oregon Electric Railway, which the westside line often uses the old right-of-way of the former line, and employees at Intel dressed in cleanroom suits.

Also on display is a burden basket created by basketmaker Sophie George in the design of the baskets used by the Kalapuya, the Native American tribe that formerly inhabited the Tualatin Valley. As few members of the Kalapuya remain and none had the knowledge of how to make the basket, George visited the British Museum to find an example of a basket in order to design the replica. A bronze cast was created and is displayed at Hillsboro Central. The station also includes a weather vane, one of a series of eight on the Westside MAX. Designed by Keith Jellum and located on the roof of the station building, the vane resembles old train signals. Constructed of bronze, the semaphore signals stop and approach.

== Bus lines ==
The transit center is served by the following bus lines:

- 46-North Hillsboro
- 47-Main/Baseline
- 48-Cornell
- 57-TV Hwy/Forest Grove
- Yamhill County Transit (33 McMinnville–Hillsboro)

== See also ==
- List of TriMet transit centers
