= Tozier =

Tozier is a surname. Notable people with the surname include:

- Albert E. Tozier (1860–1937), American newspaper editor and local historian
- Andrew J. Tozier (1838–1910), American Civil War veteran
- Charles T. Tozier (1832–1899), American politician
- Rachel Tozier (born 1992), American sport shooter
