= Senator Hare =

Senator Hare may refer to:

- William D. Hare (1834–1910), Oregon State Senate
- William G. Hare (1882–1971), Oregon State Senate
