= William Hare =

William Hare may refer to:

- William Hare (murderer) (1792 or 1804 - after 1829), Irish criminal, member of the infamous Edinburgh duo of Burke and Hare
- William D. Hare (1834–1910), Oregon politician
- William Hobart Hare (1838–1909), Episcopal bishop in America
- William G. Hare (1882–1971), Oregon politician
- William Hare (philosopher) (born 1944), English academic, professor of education and philosophy in Halifax, Nova Scotia since 1970
- William Hare (sport shooter) (1935–2005), Canadian Olympic sports shooter
- William Hare, 1st Earl of Listowel (1751–1837), Irish peer and Member of Parliament
- William Hare, 2nd Earl of Listowel (1801–1856), grandson of the 1st Earl, peer and Member of Parliament
- William Hare, 3rd Earl of Listowel (1833–1924), son of the 2nd Earl, Baron Hare, Liberal politician
- William Hare, 5th Earl of Listowel (1906–1997), grandson of the 3rd Earl, Labour politician
- William Hare Group, a UK based structural steel contractor

== See also ==
- Will Hare (1916–1997), actor
- Bill Hare, engineer
- Earl of Listowel
