= Rodolph Crandall =

American mayor (1832–1922)

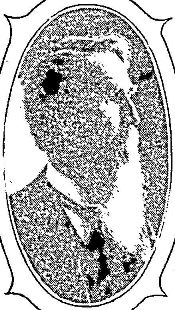

Mayor of Hillsboro, Oregon
- In office January 2, 1882 – December 13, 1882
- Preceded by: P. M. Dennis
- Succeeded by: Thomas H. Tongue

Mayor of Hillsboro, Oregon
- In office December 7, 1884 – December 14, 1885
- Preceded by: A. M. Collins
- Succeeded by: William D. Hare

Personal details
- Born: February 19, 1832 Watson, New York, US
- Died: October 23, 1922 (aged 90) Hillsboro, Oregon, US
- Spouse: Elizabeth Shannon
- Children: Four

Rodolph Crandall (February 19, 1832 – October 23, 1922) was an American politician and soldier. A native of New York, he served in the American Civil War before settling in the state of Oregon. There he held several offices in Washington County, as well as serving twice as mayor of Hillsboro.

== Early life ==
Rodolph Crandall was born on February 19, 1832, in Watson of Lewis County, New York. The family moved to Ohio, and Crandall later moved to Minnesota where he married Elizabeth Shannon (born 1847) in December 1862 in South Bend. In Minnesota, he joined the United States Army as the Civil War broke, and was transferred to the Fifth Iowa Cavalry where he rose to the rank of captain of L company before he was mustered out of service in January 1865.

== Oregon ==
In 1876, Crandall moved his family that then included four children – Max, Robert, Jesse, and Avery – to Oregon. The family settled in Washington County at the county seat of Hillsboro where Rodolph served as the county's treasurer for four years, as county assessor for four years, and as the county judge for eight years. He was one of the original members of the Hillsboro Fire Department when it was founded in 1881. In 1891, the cornerstone to the Washington County Courthouse was laid, which included a time capsule that had a picture of then judge Crandall inside.

On January 2, 1882, he was elected to the Hillsboro Board of Trustees (now City Council) to replace A. Finney, and was then also elected as president of the board to become mayor. He served as mayor until December 13 of that year when Thomas H. Tongue was elected as mayor. Crandall served a second time as mayor from 1884 to 1885, replacing A. M. Collins, who was his brother-in-law. William D. Hare replaced Crandall as mayor on December 14, 1885. His son Max also later served as the county's assessor and on the Hillsboro City Council.

== Later life ==
In civic affairs, Crandall was a member of the Free Masons, even serving time as the secretary of the local Tuality Lodge in Hillsboro. He was also an active member of the Washington County Veteran Association, serving in a leadership role for the group. Rodolph Crandall died on October 23, 1922, in Hillsboro at the age of 90 and was buried at the Hillsboro Pioneer Cemetery.
