= George W. Patterson (Oregon politician) =

American politician

Member of the Oregon Senate from the 6th district
- In office 1897–1900
- Preceded by: J. W. Maxwell
- Succeeded by: William H. Wehrung

Personal details
- Born: December 16, 1857 Belmont County, Ohio
- Died: February 7, 1932 (aged 74) Everett, Washington
- Party: Republican
- Spouse: Charlotte Wehrung
- Occupation: Businessman

George W. Patterson (December 16, 1857 – February 7, 1932) was an American businessman and politician in the U.S. state of Oregon. A native of Ohio, he was a Republican member of the Oregon State Senate in the 1890s.

== Early life ==
George W. Patterson was born on December 16, 1857, in Belmont County, Ohio, to David Patterson and Eunice Starbuck. About 1879 he moved to Oregon, settling in Washington County at Hillsboro. In Hillsboro, he established himself as an undertaker, contractor, carpenter, and furniture dealer. Patterson also served as president of the Hillsboro Club.

In 1879, Patterson married Charlotte Wehrung, daughter of Henry Wehrung on November 19, and they had two children. He purchased a lot at Fifth and Southeast Washington Street in downtown Hillsboro from his new father-in-law in 1880 and built a new home. In time, Patterson became president of the Hillsboro Furniture and Hardware Company.

== Political career ==
On December 5, 1881, he started his political career when he was elected to the Hillsboro Board of Trustees (now city council). He was re-elected the next year, but the following year he was not re-elected during the city's main election. Instead, there was a vacant seat after the December 8, 1883, election, so Patterson was elected on December 10 to fill the seat, although he resigned on April 4, 1884, and was replaced by Charles T. Tozier.

Patterson then served six years as the treasurer for Hillsboro, and five year as a school director. A Republican, he won election to the Oregon State Senate in 1896 representing District 6 that included Columbia, Tillamook, and Washington counties. In the Senate, he served on the Horticulture Committee, Railroads Committee, and in 1899 was chair of the committee on enrolled bills. Patterson remained in the Senate through the 1899 Legislature. In January 1899, he sponsored a bill to incorporate what was then the Town of Hillsboro, which was signed into law on February 7.

== Later life and death ==
He also owned land near Yamhill, Oregon, and Terrebonne, Oregon. Wife Charlotte died on October 24, 1926. George Patterson died on February 7, 1932, in Everett, Washington, at the age of 74.
