= Hares Canyon =

Valley in Oregon, United States

Coordinates: 45.701110°N 123.191110°W

Hares Canyon or Hare's Canyon is a short valley in the Northern Oregon Coast Range south of Vernonia, Oregon, United States. Located in Washington County the canyon is named after local timber businessman Joseph C. Hare and much of the canyon is now part of a state park.

== Details ==
The entrance of the canyon is near Oregon Route 47 north of the Sunset Highway. The elevation of the canyon at this point is 315 feet (96 m) above sea level. Hares Canyon is drained by Williams Creek which then drains to the West Fork of Dairy Creek and on to the Tualatin River. A Port of Tillamook Bay Railroad line runs through the canyon, while a former rail line through the canyon became part of the Banks–Vernonia State Trail. Other portions of Hare's Canyon are within L.L. "Stub" Stewart Memorial State Park which opened in 2007. The namesake of the canyon, Joseph Hare (son of Oregon Senator William D. Hare), was a local lumberman.
