= John Shute =

John Shute may refer to:

- John Shute (architect) (died 1563), English architect and miniaturist
- John Shute Barrington, 1st Viscount Barrington (1678–1734), English lawyer and theologian, born John Shute
- John W. Shute (1840–1922), American banker
- Sir John Shute (politician) (1873–1948), British politician and businessman
