= List of mayors of Hillsboro, Oregon =

List of mayors of Hillsboro, Oregon, United States, arranged chronologically by term.

== Mayors ==
#	Image	Name	Term
1		Alfred Luelling	December 8, 1876 – December 10, 1877
2		Charles T. Tozier	December 10, 1877 – December 3, 1878
3		A. M. Collins	December 3, 1878 – December 2, 1879
4		W. D. Pittenger	December 2, 1879 – December 18, 1880
5		P. M. Dennis	December 18, 1880 – January 2, 1882
6		Rodolph Crandall	January 2, 1882 – December 13, 1882
7		Thomas H. Tongue	December 13, 1882 – December 10, 1883
(3)		A. M. Collins	December 10, 1883 – December 7, 1884
(6)		Rodolph Crandall	December 7, 1884 – December 14, 1885
8		William D. Hare	December 14, 1885 – December 13, 1886
(7)		Thomas H. Tongue	December 13, 1886 – December 9, 1887
9		Francis Alonzo Bailey	December 9, 1887 – December 3, 1888
10		Samuel Towers Linklater	December 3, 1888 – December 2, 1889
11		Samuel B. Huston	December 2, 1889 – December 5, 1890
(9)		Francis Alonzo Bailey	December 5, 1890 – December 6, 1892
12		J. D. Merryman	December 6, 1892 – December 5, 1893
13		Joseph C. Hare	December 5, 1893 – December 4, 1894
(11)		Samuel B. Huston	December 4, 1894 – December 5, 1895
14		R. B. Goodin	December 5, 1895 – December 8, 1896
15		William N. Barrett	December 8, 1896 – December 5, 1899
16		George H. Wilcox	December 5, 1899 – December 4, 1900
(9)		Francis Alonzo Bailey	December 4, 1900 – December 2, 1902
(15)		William N. Barrett	December 2, 1902 – December 15, 1903
17		Benjamin P. Cornelius	December 15, 1903 – December 4, 1906
18		John Dennis	December 4, 1906 – December 1, 1908
19		J. W. Connell	December 1, 1908 – December 7, 1909
20		Augustus B. Bailey	December 7, 1909 – December 6, 1910
21		Harry T. Bagley	December 6, 1910 – January 5, 1915
(15)		William N. Barrett	January 5, 1915 – December 16, 1916
22		John M. Wall	January 2, 1917 – January 4, 1921
23		Arthur C. Shute	January 4, 1921 – February 5, 1924
24		J. B. Trullinger	February 5, 1924 – January 6, 1925
25		Mason P. Cady	January 6, 1925 – January 2, 1929
26		Orange Phelps	January 2, 1929 – January 2, 1935
27		John H. Garrett	January 2, 1935 – January 3, 1939
28		Hugh S. Rogers	January 3, 1939 – April 20, 1945
29		E. A. Griffith	April 27, 1945 – January 4, 1949
30		H. M. Seabold	January 4, 1949 – January 2, 1951
31		L. J. Alter	January 2, 1951 – January 2, 1957
32		S. Howard Davis	January 2, 1957 – January 3, 1963
33		Lloyd T. Anderson	January 3, 1963 – January 7, 1969
34		Harold R. Ruecker	January 7, 1969 – January 2, 1973
35		Miller M. Duris	January 2, 1973 – 1977
36		Larry Johnson	1977–1981
37		Jim Darr	1981 – January 1985
38		Shirley Huffman	January 1985 – January 1993
39		Gordon Faber	January 1993 – January 2, 2001
40		Tom Hughes	January 2, 2001 – January 6, 2009
41		Jerry Willey	January 6, 2009 – January 3, 2017
42		Steve Callaway	January 3, 2017 – January 7, 2025
43		Beach Pace	January 7, 2025 – present

== See also ==
- List of mayors of places in Oregon
