= Harry T. Bagley =

American mayor

Harry Taylor Bagley
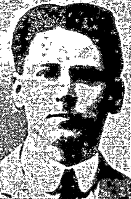

Mayor of Hillsboro, Oregon
- In office December 5, 1910 – January 4, 1915
- Preceded by: A. B. Bailey
- Succeeded by: William N. Barrett

Personal details
- Born: December 23, 1874 Canton, Ohio
- Died: January 20, 1919 (aged 44) Hillsboro, Oregon
- Party: Republican
- Spouse: Cora M. Rhea Lamkin
- Profession: Lawyer

Harry Taylor Bagley (December 23, 1874 – January 20, 1919) was an American attorney and politician in the state of Oregon. A native of Ohio, he was raised in Washington County, Oregon, where he practiced law and was a local official. He also served as a two-term mayor of Hillsboro, the county seat, and under his administration the city's public works were modernized and roads paved for the first time.

== Early life ==
Harry Bagley was born on December 23, 1874, in Canton, Ohio, to William and Sarah (née Robinson) Bagley. The couple had wed in England in 1866 before immigrating to the United States that same year. Harry was one of six children born to the English natives, which included William H., George, Nellie, and Lillie. Harry lived in Canton until 1885 when the whole family moved west to Oregon, where his father farmed. Harry continued his education at the local public schools in Washington County, and at the county seat, Hillsboro. He then attended high school in neighboring Portland beginning in 1890. In 1894, he started reading law at the law firm of Ellis and Lyons in Heppner, Oregon. William R. Ellis had served in congress and T. R. Lyons served as a judge for the Federal Court for the Alaska Territory. Bagley was admitted to practice law in Oregon in July 1897. At this time he was also a registered insurance agent in both Hillsboro and Heppner. On January 18, 1899, he married Cora M. Rhea, a native of Morrow County in Eastern Oregon, and the daughter of a banker in Heppner.

== Legal career ==
That year he began practicing law in Washington County, Oregon, and beginning in August he also served as a deputy district attorney for the county, a position he would continue to hold until August 1900 under district attorney T. J. Cleeton. Bagley served as the justice of the peace in Hillsboro, Oregon, from 1902 to 1908, and later served as the bankruptcy referee for the county.

Bagley worked for Clackamas County, Oregon, in a lawsuit in 1915 against the county over a contract with a detective hired to investigate a murder case. Meanwhile, brother George helped represent the detective suing the county, with the detective winning the lawsuit and $2,000. In 1919, he, along with Samuel B. Huston, worked for defendant Rosa Merlo on her appeal to the Oregon Supreme Court of her manslaughter conviction for killing her husband. Merlo had originally been convicted at trial in Hillsboro, where Harry's brother George served as the judge.

== Political career ==
On December 2, 1901, Bagley became the recorder for the city of Hillsboro, and held that position until December 1, 1907. A Republican, he was elected as the mayor of Hillsboro in December 1910, and served in that position from December 5, 1910, until January 4, 1915. Bagley had run unopposed on a progressive ticket with a promise to start paving streets in Hillsboro, and garnered 326 votes out of 329 votes cast in the election.

In May 1911, he signed six ordinances that ordered the paving of 12 blocks of streets in the central business district. Bagley led the official Hillsboro welcome to the arrival of the Portland, Eugene & Eastern electric railroad in January 1914. Also while mayor he appointed his brother George, and others, to a special water commission to study how to replace the city's inadequate water supply system. The commission recommended a gravity-run system that was estimated to cost $131,000 to build. Also during his tenure, the city improved their sewer system. He also served as a member of the Hillsboro school board.

== Later life and death ==
In civic affairs, he was a member of the Knights of Pythias. During World War I he was a member of the Council of National Defense. Harry T. Bagley died on January 20, 1919, of pneumonia during the 1918 flu pandemic in Hillsboro at the age of 44. He was buried at the Hillsboro Pioneer Cemetery.
