= 1886 Oregon gubernatorial election =

- June 7, 1886
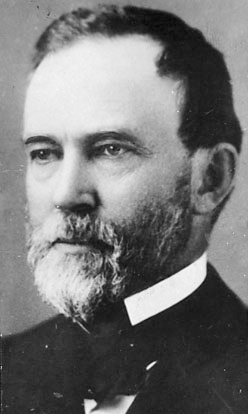

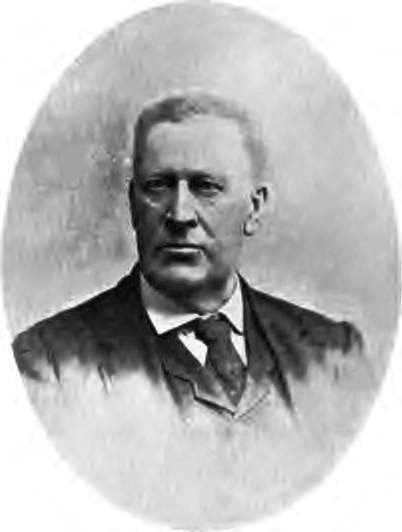
Nominee	Sylvester Pennoyer	Thomas R. Cornelius
Party	Democratic	Republican
Popular vote	27,901	24,199
Percentage	50.88%	44.13%
- County results Pennoyer: 40–50% 50–60% Cornelius: 40–50% 50–60%
Governor before election
Z. F. Moody
Republican
Elected Governor
Sylvester Pennoyer
Democratic

The 1886 Oregon gubernatorial election took place on June 7, 1886, to elect the governor of the U.S. state of Oregon. The election matched Republican former state senator Thomas R. Cornelius against Democrat Sylvester Pennoyer.

Pennoyer gained support for advocating the use of American labor over Chinese immigrants.

== Results ==
1886 Oregon gubernatorial election
Party	Candidate	Votes	%	±%
Democratic	Sylvester Pennoyer	27,901	50.88%	+2.64%
Republican	Thomas R. Cornelius	24,199	44.13%	−7.61%
Prohibition	J. E. Houston	2,727	4.97%	
Write-in	Scattering	4	0.01%	
	Blank	1	0.00%	
Total votes		54,832	100.00%	
Majority		3,702	6.75%	
Democratic gain from Republican		Swing	+10.25%	

=== Results by county ===
After this election, Columbia County would not vote Democratic again until 1922.

County	Sylvester Pennoyer Democratic		Thomas R. Cornelius Republican		J. E. Houston Prohibition		Margin		Total votes cast
County	#	%	#	%	#	%	#	%	Total votes cast
Baker	1,124	57.20%	799	40.66%	42	2.14%	325	16.54%	1,965
Benton	1,013	48.94%	905	43.72%	152	7.34%	108	5.22%	2,070
Clackamas	1,294	51.25%	1,081	42.81%	150	5.94%	213	8.44%	2,525
Clatsop	1,002	55.12%	731	40.21%	85	4.68%	271	14.91%	1,818
Columbia	359	48.91%	345	47.00%	30	4.09%	14	1.91%	734
Coos	694	44.23%	792	5.48%	83	5.29%	-98	-6.25%	1,569
Crook	529	59.84%	315	35.63%	40	4.52%	214	24.21%	884
Curry	189	46.78%	206	50.99%	9	2.23%	-17	-4.21%	404
Douglas	1,095	44.57%	1,088	44.28%	274	11.15%	7	0.28%	2,457
Gilliam	533	51.40%	476	45.90%	27	2.60%	57	5.50%	1,037 (Note: Includes 1 Scattering vote)
Grant	863	53.74%	715	44.52%	28	1.74%	148	9.22%	1,606
Jackson	1,275	57.54%	838	37.82%	103	4.65%	437	19.72%	2,216
Josephine	500	53.25%	429	45.69%	10	1.06%	71	7.56%	939
Klamath	326	54.88%	267	44.95%	1	0.17%	59	9.93%	594
Lake	289	58.86%	185	37.68%	17	3.46%	104	21.18%	491
Lane	1,349	49.45%	1,290	47.29%	89	3.26%	59	2.16%	2,728
Linn	1,712	53.38%	1,331	41.50%	164	5.11%	381	11.88%	3,207
Marion	1,622	41.10%	1,938	49.11%	386	9.78%	-316	-8.01%	3,946
Morrow	769	55.77%	529	38.36%	81	5.87%	240	17.40%	1,379
Multnomah	4,261	53.96%	3,281	41.55%	351	4.45%	980	12.41%	7,896 (Note: Includes 3 Scattering votes)
Polk	818	47.48%	767	44.52%	138	8.01%	51	2.96%	1,723
Tillamook	177	39.69%	246	55.16%	23	5.16%	-69	-15.47%	446
Umatilla	1,518	54.29%	1,154	41.27%	124	4.43%	364	13.02%	2,796
Union	1,578	53.64%	1,356	46.09%	8	0.27%	222	7.55%	2,942
Wasco	1,105	49.60%	989	44.39%	134	6.01%	116	5.21%	2,228
Washington	825	42.95%	1,002	52.16%	93	4.84%	-177	-9.21%	1,921 (Note: Includes 1 Blank vote)
Yamhill	1,082	46.82%	1,144	49.50%	85	3.68%	-62	-2.68%	2,311
Total	27,901	50.88%	24,199	44.13%	2,727	4.97%	3,702	6.75%	54,832

==== Counties that flipped from Republican to Democratic ====
- Benton
- Clackamas
- Clatsop
- Columbia
- Douglas
- Grant
- Multnomah
- Polk
