= Thomas R. Cornelius =

American politician (1827–1899)

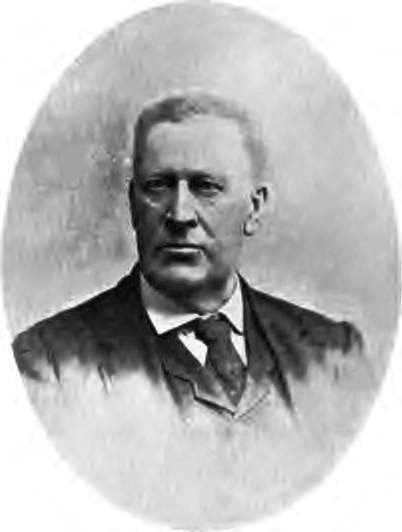

Member of the Oregon Territory Council
- In office 1856–1858
- Preceded by: A. P. Dennison
- Succeeded by: Position abolished
- Constituency: Washington, Multnomah, & Columbia counties

Member of the Oregon State Senate
- In office 1859 – 1876 (except 1862)
- Preceded by: Position established
- Succeeded by: A. B. Wait
- Constituency: Washington, Clatsop, Columbia, Tillamook

President of the Oregon State Senate
- In office 1866–1867
- Preceded by: John H. Mitchell
- Succeeded by: Benjamin Franklin Burch
- Constituency: Oregon

Personal details
- Born: Thomas Ramsey Cornelius; November 16, 1827 Missouri, U.S.
- Died: June 24, 1899 (aged 71) Oregon
- Party: Whig; Republican
- Spouses: Florentine Wilkes (m. 1849; died 1864) Missouri Smith (m. 1866)

Thomas Ramsey Cornelius (November 16, 1827 – June 24, 1899) was a prominent American politician and soldier in the early history of Oregon. Born in Missouri, he moved to the Oregon Country with his family as a young man, where he fought in the Cayuse War and Yakima Indian War against the Native Americans. He settled in Washington County near what later became Cornelius, named in his honor.

A Whig and later a Republican, he served in the Oregon Territorial Legislature where following statehood, he served in the Oregon State Senate. In the Senate, he served one term as the president of that chamber. He also built the Cornelius Pass Road that bears his name. He was the father of Benjamin P. Cornelius, who was also prominent in state politics.

== Early life ==
Cornelius was born in Missouri, on November 16, 1827, to Elizabeth and Benjamin Cornelius. In 1845, Thomas and his family traveled over the Oregon Trail to the Oregon Country and set up a farm on the Tualatin Plains, north of what would become the community of Cornelius. After the Whitman Massacre in late 1847, Thomas volunteered for the militia of the Oregon Provisional Government in 1848. The militia prosecuted the Cayuse War in an attempt to punish those responsible for the killings at the Whitman Mission.

After gold was discovered in California, Cornelius journeyed there for a brief time, returning to the Oregon Territory in 1849. The next year, he married Florentine Wilkes, and they had six children together before she died in 1864, including son Benjamin. The family would settle on 640 acres (2.6 km^{2}) of their Donation Land Claim near Cornelius. In 1855, a second war against the Native Americans started east of the Cascade Mountains against the Yakama tribe. Cornelius volunteered again for the militia. For three months, he led a company with the rank of captain before being elected as colonel after James W. Nesmith resigned his commission. Cornelius continued as colonel until the end of the war in 1856. During this campaign, his troops waged war indiscriminately against any natives found in the area. In one case, a Nez Perce native was accused of being a spy and summarily hanged, which alarmed members of the U.S. military.

== Political career ==
In 1856, Cornelius was elected to upper chamber of the Oregon Territorial Legislature, called the council. Serving as a Whig, he represented Washington, Columbia, and Multnomah counties in District 8. He won re-election to the Council in 1857 and again in 1858 to the final session of the territorial legislature. In 1859, he continued holding office in the newly formed Oregon State Senate after Oregon entered the Union on February 14, 1859, as the 33rd state.

In the Oregon Senate, Cornelius continued as a Republican, representing Washington County and several other counties through the 1874 legislature. His service was interrupted by the American Civil War during 1862 session, when he was authorized by President Abraham Lincoln to raise a regiment of cavalry for federal service. He was chosen as colonel of the troops and they deployed to a military post at Walla Walla, Washington, where he assumed command. He resigned during the summer of 1862 and returned home.

During the 1866 legislature, Cornelius was selected as President of the Oregon Senate. In 1886, he won the Republican nomination for Governor of Oregon, but lost the general election to Sylvester Pennoyer.

== Later life and family ==
After his first wife died in 1864, Cornelius remarried in 1866 to Missouri A. Smith. In 1872, he moved to Cornelius, which would be renamed after him, and opened a store. In addition to the store, Cornelius owned a total of 1,500 acres (6.1 km^{2}), including covering three farms, a warehouse, and a sawmill. He built the Cornelius Pass Road that linked the Tualatin Valley to the Columbia River. Cornelius died on June 24, 1899, at the age of 71. He was buried at the Cornelius Methodist Church Cemetery.

Party political offices
Preceded by Zenas Ferry Moody	Republican nominee for Governor of Oregon; 1886	Succeeded by David P. Thompson
