= John W. Shute =

John Wright Shute
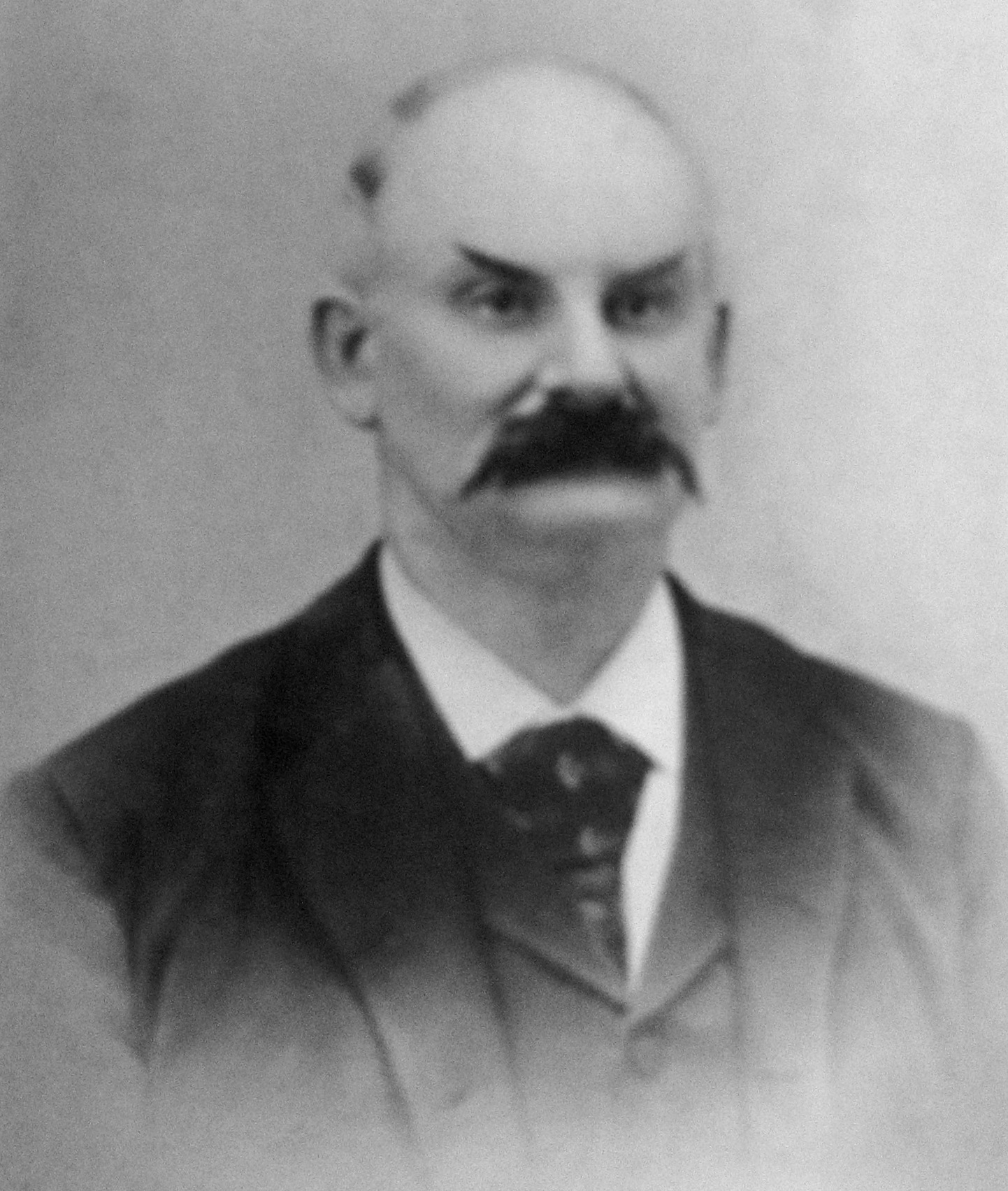
- Shute in 1903
- Born: February 17, 1840; Montgomery County, New York
- Died: March 19, 1922 (aged 82); Hillsboro, Oregon
- Resting place: Hillsboro Pioneer Cemetery; 45.520012°N 123.00743°W
- Occupation: Banker
- Spouses: Elizabeth Constable; Mary E. Smith

John Wright Shute (February 17, 1840 – March 19, 1922) was an American banker in the state of Oregon. He was the founder of the first bank in Washington County, Oregon, and both Shute Park and Shute Road in Hillsboro, Oregon, are his namesakes.

== Early life ==
John Shute was born in Montgomery County, New York, to Lewis P. Shute and the former Eliza Jane Wright on February 17, 1840. Of Dutch heritage, he grew up on the family farm and received a limited education in the family of eight children. In 1857, Shute moved to Kankakee, Illinois, and then later that year began the journey to the Oregon Territory.

== Oregon ==
In January 1858, he arrived in Oregon after traveling by ship from New York City to the Isthmus of Panama and then by steamer to San Francisco and Portland. After arriving he worked on a farm in Washington County and in Eastern Oregon in the Walla Walla Valley. Shute then moved to Multnomah County where he ran a warehouse and mercantile with several partners. After a year he sold his stake in the business and purchased an 80-acre (320,000 m^{2}) farm near Hillsboro, the county seat of Washington County. Shute married Elizabeth Constable in November 1867 in Washington County, and the couple had three children. From 1889 to 1890 he served on the Hillsboro city council.

Over time he increased the size of his farm to 800 acres (3.2 km^{2}) and in 1888 founded the First National Bank in Hillsboro. Starting with $50,000, he operated the bank as president until 1897 when he closed it. This bank was the first in Washington County. In 1893, the bank survived the Panic of 1893 and a run on the bank. After closing First National, he opened a private bank and was a major land holder in Hillsboro and the surrounding area.

He married a second time, to Mary E. Smith (1877 - 1968), and they had three children. After marrying his significantly younger second wife, local perception was that she married him for his money and that he only married her for her looks. In 1901, Shute donated land within the city limits for the creation of the first Catholic Church in Hillsboro. The following year the church was opened and named after St. Matthew. On December 21, 1906, the City of Hillsboro purchased a 15-acre (61,000 m^{2}) tract of land from Shute for $1,622, with the condition that the land be used as a park and named in his honor. The city passed a levy to finance the purchase of its first park at 1.8 mills per assessed valuation. At the time the total assessed value in the city was just over $600,000.

In 1910, Shute was involved in a legal dispute over ownership of some land with John Foote, on old friend and former partner with Shute in a bank, and a third party. The third party claimed Shute and a brother of Foote were dominating Foote's life and exercising undue influence on his financial decisions. This third party, represented by Samuel B. Huston, was the children of a family that allowed Foote to stay on their farm rent free for many years, and to which Foote deeded land to. The issue in the legal case was if Foote had retained control and the property was only to pass at his death, or if the land passed immediately to the children. The dispute made headlines as Foote was worth about $100,000 and Shute about $250,000 at the time.

== Later life and family ==
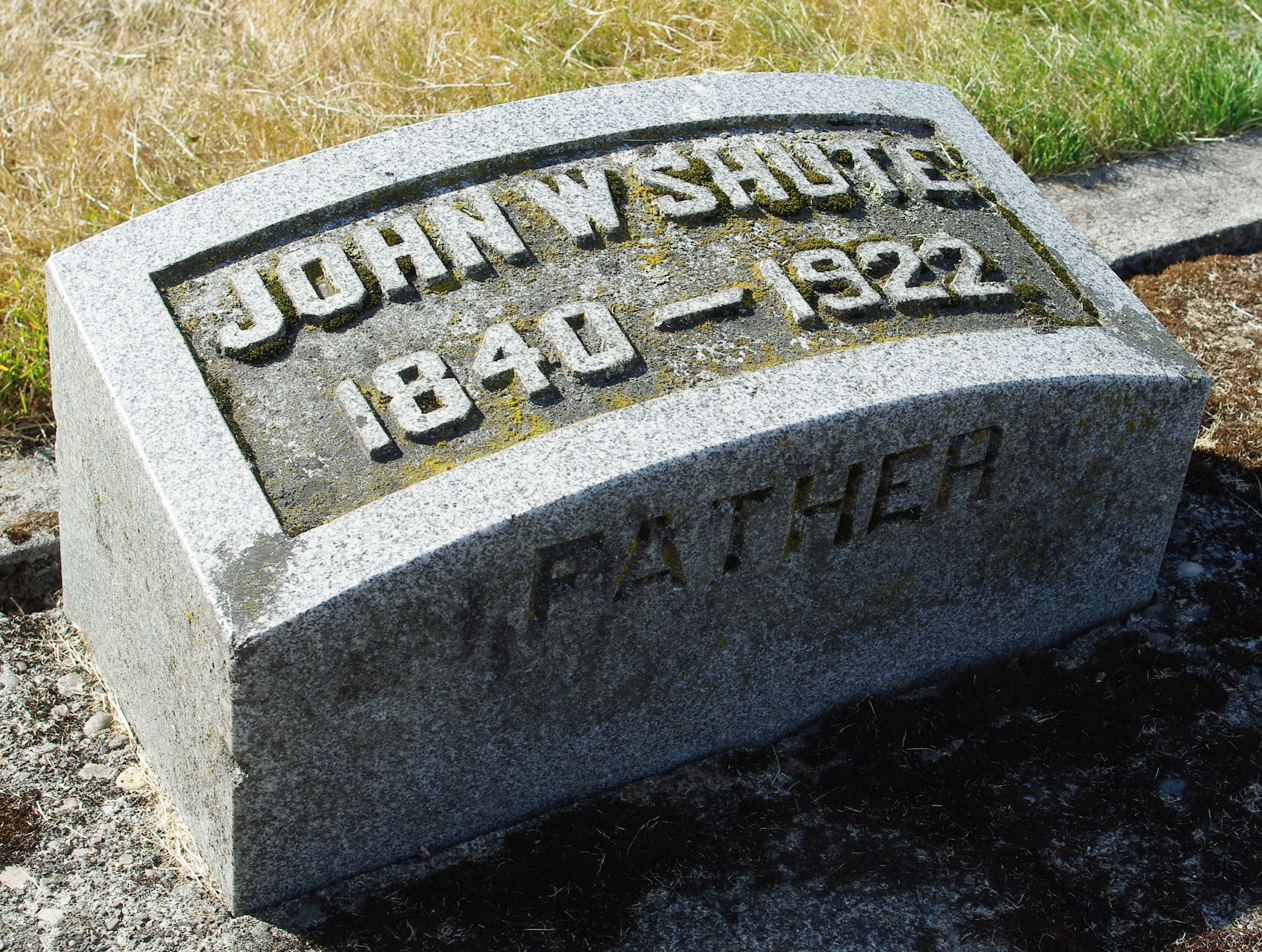
Shute's headstone

A Republican, Shute served as a county commissioner on several occasions. John Wright Shute died on March 19, 1922, at his home in Hillsboro at the age of 82 and was buried at Hillsboro Pioneer Cemetery. Politician William G. Hare served as one of the pallbearers at the funeral. Shute's son, Arthur C. Shute, was also in the banking business and was president of the Shute Savings Bank after his father's death. Other children included sons Edward A. and Tracy H., twin daughters Marian and Mary.
