= Robert M. Veatch =

American politician

Robert M. Veatch, Oregon politician and business leader as he appeared during his 1904 campaign for U.S. Congress.

Robert M. Veatch (1843–1925), commonly known in his later years as "Uncle Bob", was a teacher, farmer, mercantile owner, and politician in the U.S. state of Oregon. Veatch is best remembered for having served two terms in each the Oregon House of Representatives and Oregon State Senate and for having served as the long-time mayor of Cottage Grove, Oregon.

Veatch was twice an unsuccessful candidate for United States Congress, losing to incumbents as a fusion Democrat in November 1898 and as a Democrat in November 1904.

== Biography ==
=== Early years ===
Robert M. Veatch was born June 5, 1843, in White County, Illinois. He was the son of Isaac Veatch, a blacksmith and cabinet maker who originally hailed from the state of North Carolina, and the former Mary Miller, a woman born in Georgia.

The Veatch family moved to Iowa when Robert was young and he remained in that state until the age of 16. Veatch then left home for Missouri, where he farmed for four years.

In 1864 Veatch crossed the plains from Missouri to California, moving north to join three brothers in Oregon after just three months there. He settled in the southern Willamette Valley town of Creswell, located in Lane County.

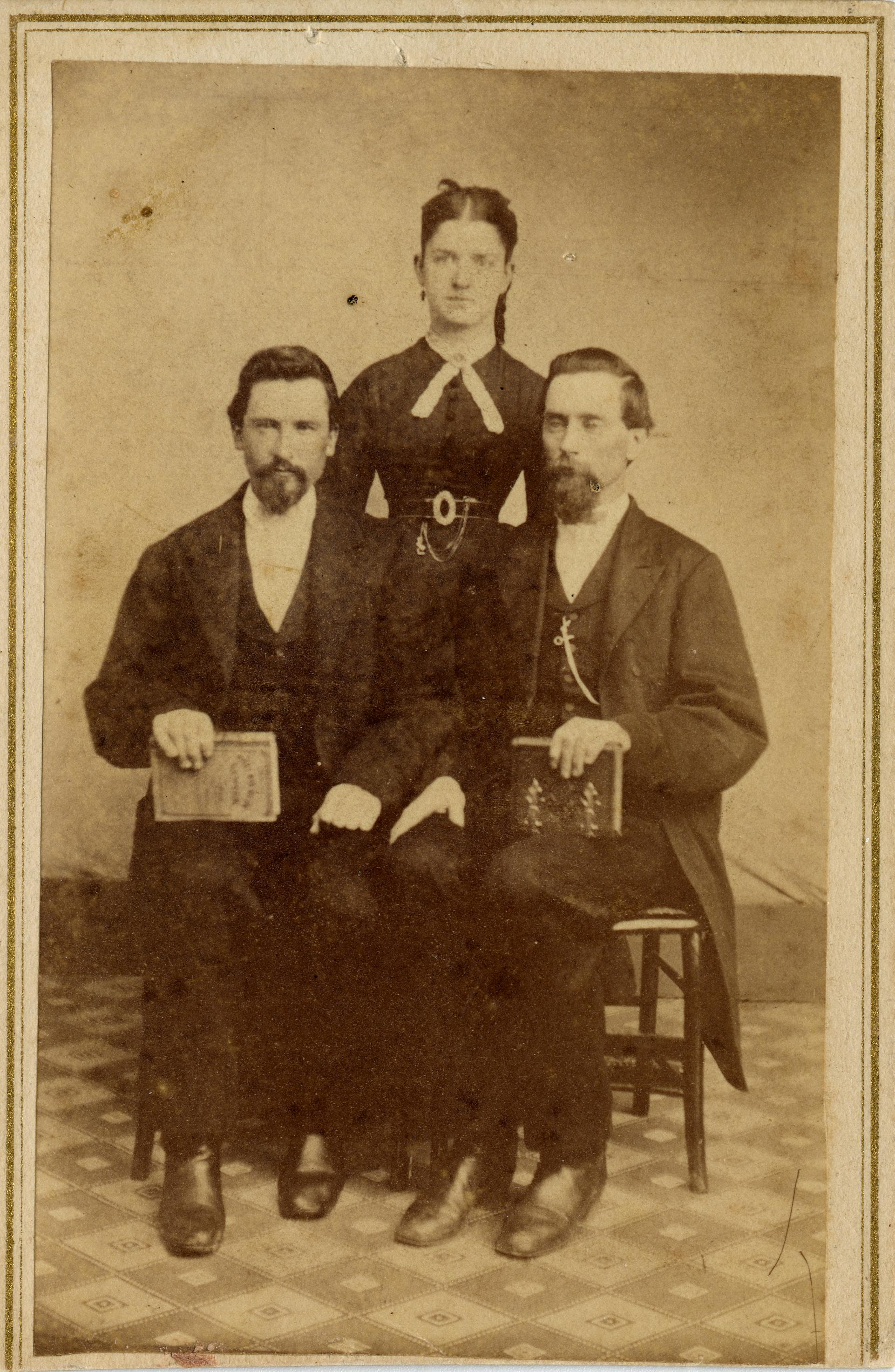
First Class of Oregon Agricultural College to graduate in 1870: Robert M. Veatch, Alice E. Biddle, James K. P. Currin.

Veatch attended Willamette University for one year before transferring to the new Oregon Agricultural College (OAC), today's Oregon State University, in 1868. He graduated from OAC with a Bachelor's degree in 1871, a member of the second graduating class from that institution.

Veatch was married in March 1872 to the former Seraphina Currin. The couple would raise three children together, a girl and two boys, before Mrs. Veatch's death in February 1884 following a short period of illness. One son, John C. Veatch, would later gain some measure of prominence as an Assistant United States Attorney in Portland.

Following graduation Veatch initially worked as a school teacher, remaining in that profession for a total of seven years. Veatch managed to earn enough money to pay off his $300 student debt and to save enough money, borrowing an additional $3,000 at 12 percent interest, to purchase a farm six miles east of Cottage Grove. Veatch worked as a farmer for the next decade, improving the farm and paying off its mortgage.

=== Political career ===
Veatch was a committed member of the Democratic Party and while still working as a farmer was selected as that party's nominee for the Oregon House of Representatives in 1882. Veatch won election in November 1882 and was returned to the state house by his constituents in 1884.

In 1886 Veatch made the jump to the Oregon State Senate, winning a four-year term in November of that year. In 1890 Veatch stood for re-election and won again, remaining in the position until being replaced in the election of 1894.

In 1898 Veatch ran for the United States Congress as a fusion candidate of the Democrats and the Populists against incumbent Republican Thomas H. Tongue, losing by 2,037 votes.

Veatch was elected as a delegate to the 1900 Democratic National Convention, held in Kansas City, Missouri, where he helped nominate William Jennings Bryan for President of the United States.

A second run for Congress came in 1904, when Veatch was nominated by the Democratic Party in Oregon's 1st Congressional District to take on incumbent Republican Binger Hermann. Veatch was once again unsuccessful in his effort to win election to Washington from the voters in his heavily Republican state.

Veatch was subsequently elected mayor of Cottage Grove, remaining in that position for several terms of office.

=== Griffin & Veatch Company ===
From 1896 Veatch was a principal in the Griffin & Veatch Company, a wholesale and retail hardware and plumbing store located in Cottage Grove. The firm catered to the mining industry and was a leading supplier of gunpowder for blasting and other supplies necessary for metal mining. In addition Griffin & Veatch sold farm implements and sporting goods such as rifles, ammunition, tents, and fishing tackle. During the first decade of the 20th century, Griffin & Veatch was reckoned to be one of the leading mercantile firms in the state of Oregon outside of the Portland metropolitan area.

Veatch remained with the firm until 1917, when he sold his interest in the company and entered retirement.

=== Death and legacy ===
Robert M. Veatch died May 8, 192,5 in Cottage Grove at the home of his son. He was 81 years old at the time of his death.
