= Miller M. Duris =

American politician

Miller Duris

Mayor of Hillsboro, Oregon
- In office 1973–1977
- Preceded by: Harold R. Ruecker
- Succeeded by: Larry Johnson

Washington County Commissioner
- In office 1977–1981

Member of the Hillsboro City Council
- In office 1969–1973

Personal details
- Born: March 2, 1928 Rainier, Oregon
- Died: March 23, 2014 (aged 86)
- Party: Democrat
- Spouse: Sally Duris
- Children: 6

Miller M. Duris (March 2, 1928 – March 23, 2014) was an American politician in the state of Oregon. A native Oregonian, he served as mayor of Hillsboro, Oregon, and as chairman of the Washington County Board of Commissioners in the 1970s and 1980s. He served in the United States Navy and worked for nearly 30 years at Tektronix.

== Early life ==
Miller Michael Duris was born on March 2, 1928, in Rainier, Oregon, along the Columbia River to John and Mary (née Duhon) Duris, who emigrated from what is now Slovakia. After growing up in Rainier, he joined the United States Navy in October 1945 at the age of 17. While in the Navy he took classes on electronics that eventually led to a job at Tektronix and served on the USS LSM 323 and the USS Achernar before leaving the Navy in 1949.

During his naval service he began sending letters to Celestine Sally Weverka of Hillsboro, and the two married on October 11, 1948. The couple had six daughters, Cheryl, Carin, Cynthia, Carol, Colleen, and Cathy. Duris began working for Hillsboro's Meltebeke's Furniture after leaving the Navy, and then starting working for Tektronix in 1951 where he would work as a technical writer. Duris began managing Tektronix’s Washington, D.C., office and the family moved to Virginia in 1959, but returned to Hillsboro in 1967. He started the Pigtail-Ponytail softball group for girls in 1969, which is now the Hillsboro Girls Softball Association. Duris remained involved in the group until 1988, and himself played in softball leagues until 2009.

== Political career ==
In 1969, he entered politics and was appointed to the Hillsboro City Council. He won re-election to the council in November 1970, running unopposed for the position. Duris then ran for mayor in 1972, defeating Kenneth Stuart in the November election and taking office on January 2, 1973. During this time he owned Miller's Sweet Shop from 1971 to 1974, and left Tektronix in 1977. In November 1974, he won re-election over A. T. Antonelli to a second two-year term as mayor. He along with the other members of the council, and PayLess Drug, were sued over a land use decision, with the case reaching the Oregon Court of Appeals in 1975, where he and the other defendants prevailed. Also while he was mayor, he officiated at the dedication of Bicentennial Park on October 19, 1976.

A Democrat, he decided to run for the at-large commissioner position on the Washington County Commission in 1976. He won the Democratic nomination over Deneice Won in the May primary, and then defeated Republican Allan Paterson in the general election in November. While serving on the commission he became a member of the Columbia Region Association of Governments as the county’s representative to the multi-state organization.

On January 4, 1978, Duris was elected as chairman of the county commission. That year voters approved changes to the county charter, with the commission converting to a three-member, full-time commission in 1979. In November 1978, Duris announced he would run for the new county commission, and then won election to the reconstituted commission in January, which had a special two-year term. Duris then ran for the new at-large commissioner position in 1980 in order to be chair.

By November 1980 he was no longer the chairperson of the commission, and in 1981 the commission was to change back to five positions, though only the chairperson would be a full-time position. Duris lost the race to be chair to Virginia Dagg, and left office in January 1981. He declined to run again for the commission in 1982. Duris tried to re-enter politics when he ran for a spot on the school board of the Hillsboro Union High School District (now part of the Hillsboro School District) in March 1986. He did not win, and in March 1988 he lost a second attempt to join the same school board.

== Later life and death ==
After leaving politics he began working as facilities manager for Tuality Community Hospital in Hillsboro, before retiring in 1991. Duris died on March 23, 2014, at the age of 86 after battling Parkinson's disease. His wife Sally survived him, as did five of his six daughters. He was a member of the local Elks Lodge, an Optimist, First Catholic Slovak Union, and a member of the Hillsboro Veterans of Foreign Wars post.
