= D. O. Quick =

American politician

David O. Quick
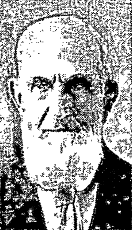

Member of the Oregon House of Representatives
- In office 1864–1866
- Constituency: Washington County

Personal details
- Born: August 27, 1829 Indiana
- Died: December 1910 (age 81) Oregon
- Party: Republican
- Spouse(s): Sarah Updyke; Amelia E. Young

David O. Quick (August 27, 1829 – December 1910) was an American educator and politician in the state of Oregon. A native of Indiana and a trained lawyer, he crossed the Oregon Trail where he was a school teacher and later farmer. He served one term as a Republican in the Oregon House of Representatives.

== Early years ==
David Quick was born on August 27, 1829, in the state of Indiana. He later moved to Illinois where was a teacher and he read law under the direction of James Davis, and was admitted to the Illinois bar in 1850. He married Sarah Updyke and had son child, Emerson, before she died in 1857. In 1858, he married Amelia E. Young, and they had seven children together; Elmer, Emerson O., William D., Anna May, Warren, Frederick, and Ada Gertrude.

In 1859, Quick and his family crossed the Great Plains on the Oregon Trail to reach Oregon. Along the way, the family suffered hardships and had to sell most of their possession before Quick worked as a miner and earned enough to continue the journey. After arriving, he was admitted to the Oregon bar in 1864. The family settled in Washington County where Quick owned a hotel in Hillsboro along with a saw mill, as well as taught school.

== Political career ==
Quick was elected to the Oregon Legislative Assembly in 1864. He served as a Republican in the House of Representatives for District 36 in Washington County. He served one, two-year term in the legislature, present for both the 1864 regular session and the 1865 special session.

== Later years ==
Quick lived in Washington County until 1888, and then moved to the community of Suver in Polk County. There he owned a nursery and a farm, living in that county for 12 years before later living in Linn and Benton counties. David O. Quick died in December 1910 in Grants Pass in Southern Oregon at the age of 81.
