= Hillsboro Pioneer Cemetery =

Cemetery in Hillsboro, Oregon, U.S.

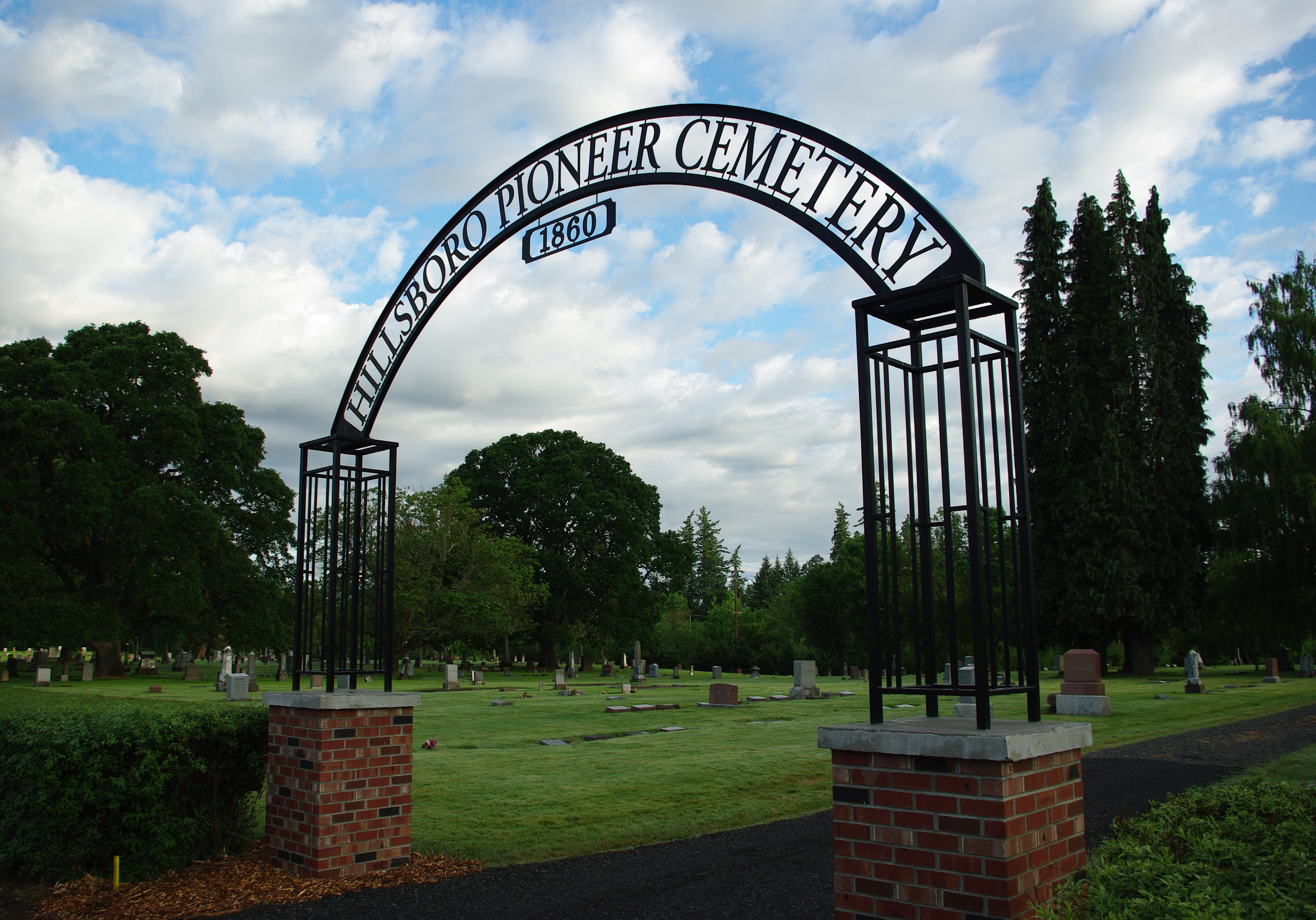
- Entrance to the cemetery
- Interactive map of Hillsboro Pioneer Cemetery

Details
- Established: 1860
- Location: Hillsboro, Oregon
- Country: United States
- Coordinates: 45°31′14″N 123°00′22″W
- Type: Public
- Owned by: City of Hillsboro
- Size: 8.42 acres (3.41 ha)

The Hillsboro Pioneer Cemetery is a pioneer cemetery in Hillsboro, Oregon, United States. It is located at the west end of the city along the Tualatin Valley Highway and adjacent to Dairy Creek. The 8.42-acre (3.41 ha) cemetery comprises three formerly private cemeteries. In 1973, the city of Hillsboro gained title to what is the oldest cemetery in Washington County.

== History ==
The cemetery is situated on what was previously part of the David Hill land claim that was recorded on July 4, 1847. Hill died in 1850, and in 1860 the Masonic Order and the Independent Order of Odd Fellows (IOOF) established a cemetery on the current site. The IOOF portion of the cemetery was to the east of the Masons' part. Around 1915 another section owned by IOOF was added west of the Masons' section. On August 7, 1973, the city of Hillsboro received the deeds to the cemeteries and took over maintenance and operations.

In 1995, 155 grave sites were vandalized, causing over $75,000 in damage. The city made improvements in 2012 with the addition of an arched, wrought-iron entry and information kiosk. Paid for in part by a state grant, the project cost $13,000 to complete. In 2014, the city completed a master plan to make $1.7 million in improvements, including sidewalks, parking, and fencing.

== Details ==
Hillsboro Pioneer Cemetery is an irreducible fund cemetery organized under Oregon Revised Statutes 65.860 where all funds received go into a fund that is not reduced and only interest is used for maintenance. Hillsboro's city recorder manages all records of the facility. The Hillsboro Historical Society holds a semi-annual event at the cemetery that includes re-enactments by actors demonstrating the lives of some of those buried at the cemetery.

== Notable burials ==
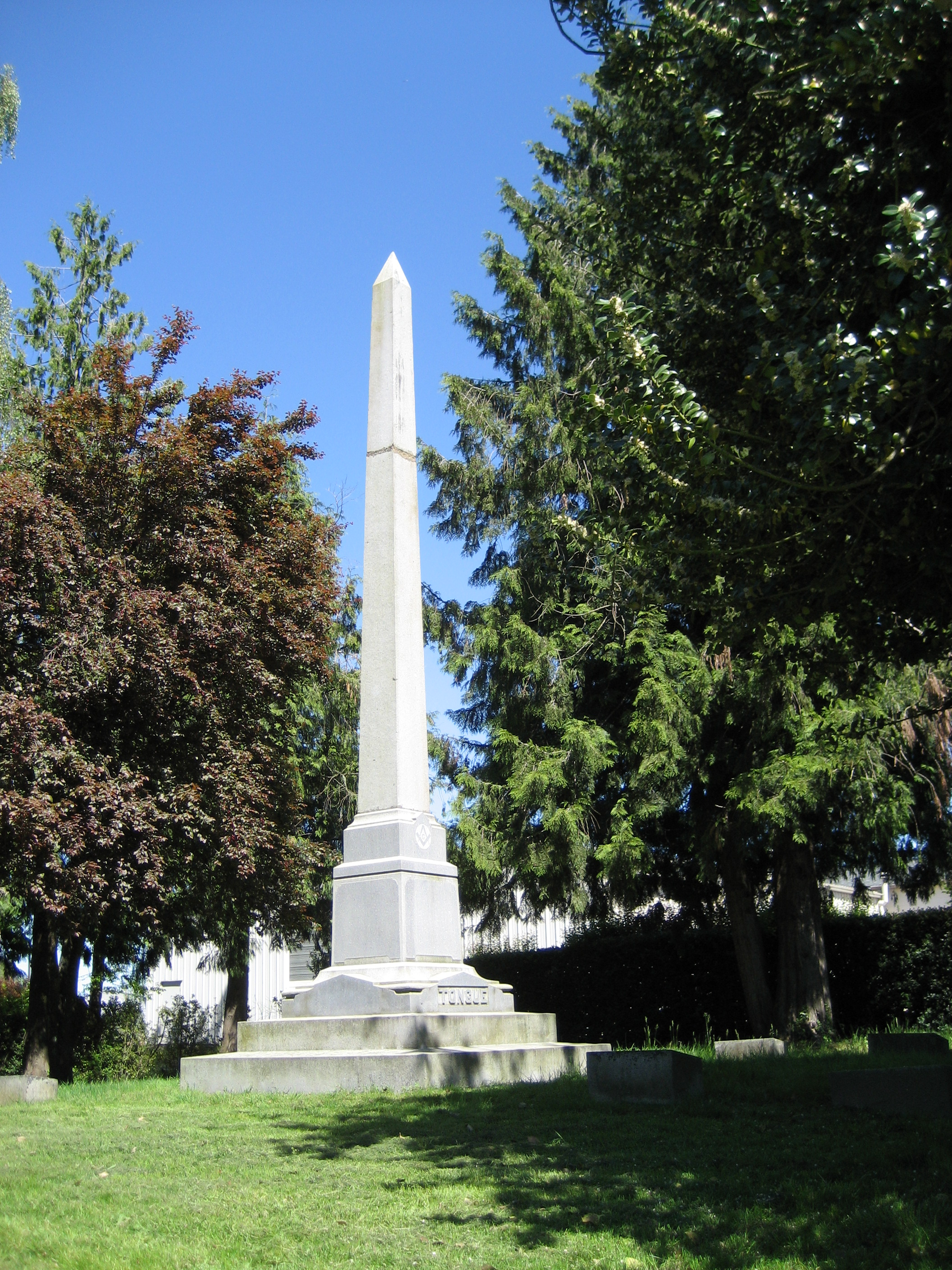
Tongue family obelisk at the cemetery.

- William N. Barrett (1855-1916), state legislator and Hillsboro mayor.
- Rodolph Crandall (1832-1922), Hillsboro mayor and county judge
- John Smith Griffin (1807-1899), missionary and Champoeg Meetings participant.
- William D. Hare (1834-1910), state legislator and Hillsboro mayor.
- David Hill (1809-1850), legislator in the provisional government.
- Fern Hobbs (1883-1964), secretary to Oregon Governor Oswald West and involved in incident in Copperfield.
- John W. Shute (1840-1922), banker and namesake for Shute Park
- Thomas Tongue (1912-1994), Oregon Supreme Court justice.
- Thomas H. Tongue (1844-1903), Congressman, state legislator, and Hillsboro mayor.
- Albert E. Tozier (1860-1937), journalist and historian.
- Charles T. Tozier (1832-1899), mayor and state legislator
- William H. Wehrung (1861-1934), state legislator and city councilor
- Mary Ramsey Wood (1787-1908), "First Mother Queen of Oregon Pioneers"

== See also ==
- List of cemeteries in Oregon
