= Joseph C. Hare =

American mayor (1863–1937)

13th Mayor of Hillsboro, Oregon
- In office December 5, 1893 - December 4, 1894
- Preceded by: J. D. Merryman
- Succeeded by: Samuel B. Huston

Personal details
- Born: June 15, 1863 Hillsboro, Oregon
- Died: May 11, 1937 (aged 73) Portland, Oregon
- Party: Republican
- Spouse: Elinor Grace Bothwell
- Relations: William D. Hare; William G. Hare
- Children: 1
- Education: Pacific University
- Profession: Lumberman

Joseph Coulson Hare (June 15, 1863 – May 11, 1937) was an American politician and lumberman in Oregon. A native of Hillsboro, he was the son of William D. Hare; both were mayors of Hillsboro. Hares Canyon in Washington County is named in his honor.

== Early life ==
Hare was born in Hillsboro, Oregon, to William D. Hare and Henrietta Hare (née Schofield) on June 15, 1863. One of seven children, including William G. Hare, he was educated in the schools of Hillsboro. After his primary education Hare attended Pacific University in nearby Forest Grove. In 1883, he married the former Elinor Grace Bothwell; they had one son, William B., who became a doctor and naval surgeon.

== Career ==
After college Hare started in the lumber business, acquiring holdings in mills in the northwest part of Oregon. He was also involved in civic affairs in Hillsboro, serving on the city council from 1890 to 1894. In 1893, Hare was elected as the 13th mayor of Hillsboro, serving in office from December 5, 1893, until December 4, 1894, a position previously held by his father. He also had a dairy farm of 350 acres (1.4 km^{2}) near the city along the Tualatin River, named Holyrood in honor of his wife's ancestors from Scotland.

In 1897, he built a sawmill near what is now Beaverton followed by a mill near Buxton in 1912. Here his company logged parts of the Northern Oregon Coast Range, including a valley that was later named after him. A member of the Republican Party and a Mason, Hare retired from the logging business in 1917 and moved to Portland, but remained active in the Ancient Order of United Workmen forestry fraternal organization.

== Legacy ==
A railroad station near Manning, west of Buxton, and another stop in Aloha between Beaverton and Hillsboro, were both named for Hare. Hares Canyon near Buxton was also named for him. In August 2003, a new state park in the Hares Canyon was to be named Hares Canyon State Park, but the name was later changed to L. L. "Stub" Stewart State Park.
