= Benjamin P. Cornelius =

American politician

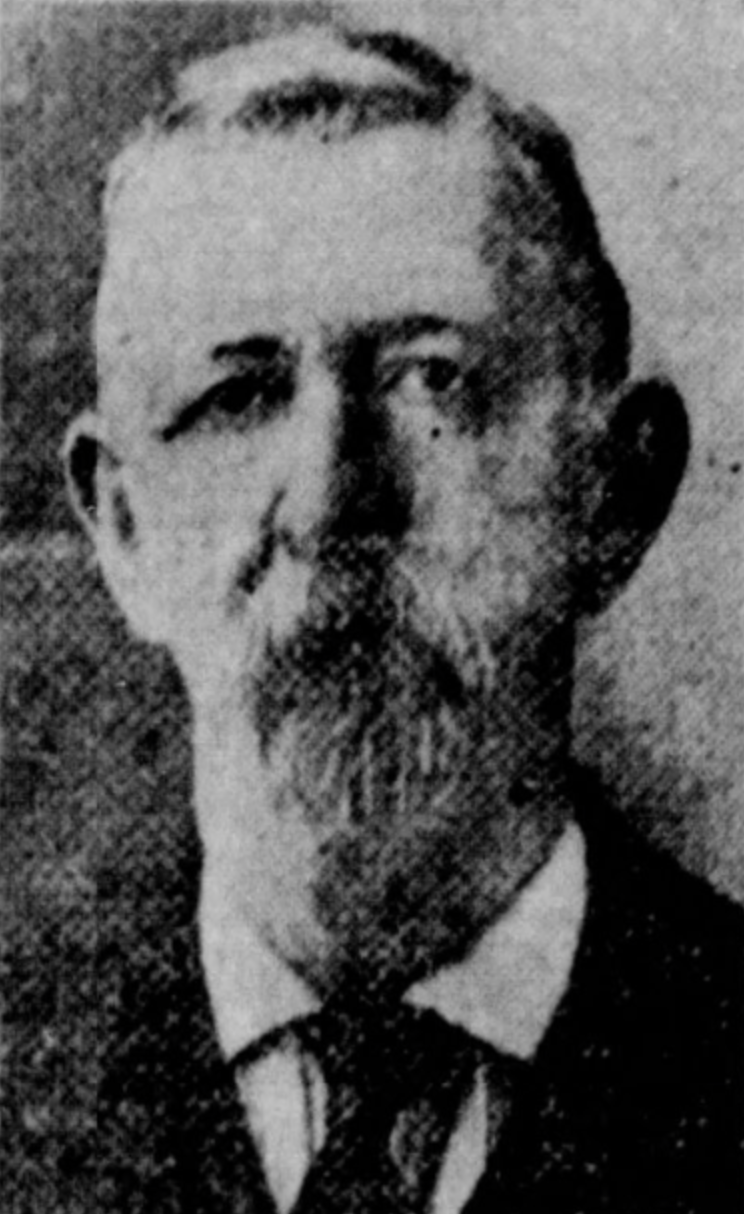

Member of the Oregon House of Representatives
- In office 1893—1894
- Constituency: Washington County

Member of the Oregon House of Representatives
- In office 1917—1918
- Constituency: Washington County

17th Mayor of Hillsboro, Oregon
- In office 1903—1906
- Preceded by: William N. Barrett
- Succeeded by: John Dennis

Personal details
- Born: November 9, 1850 Hillsboro, Oregon, US
- Died: December 24, 1930 (aged 80) Hillsboro, Oregon, US
- Party: Republican
- Spouse: Esther A. Barrett
- Profession: Farmer

Benjamin Peyton Cornelius (November 9, 1850 – December 24, 1930) was an American politician and judge in Oregon. A Republican, he served in the Oregon House of Representatives and as the mayor of Hillsboro, Oregon. The son of Thomas R. Cornelius, he was also the sheriff of Washington County and a judge in that county.

== Early life ==
Cornelius was born to Thomas Cornelius and Florentine Wilks on November 9, 1850, in Hillsboro, Washington County, Oregon. He was raised in that county and was engaged in agriculture before marrying Esther A. Barrett on November 11, 1871, in neighboring Glencoe.

Cornelius became involved in politics as a Republican and served as a delegate to the county's party convention and state conventions starting in the 1880s.

== Political career ==
In 1884, Cornelius won his first election when he was elected as the sheriff of Washington County. He was elected again in 1888, and in 1894 was elected as a county judge. In 1892, Cornelius entered state politics and was elected to a two-year term in the Oregon House of Representatives as a Republican representing Washington County.

Following his term as county judge he returned to farming before winning election as mayor of Hillsboro in 1903. The seventeenth person to serve as mayor of Washington County's seat, he was in office from December 15, 1903, until December 4, 1906. Cornelius returned to the Oregon House in 1917 after winning election in 1916, again representing Washington County. Benjamin P. Cornelius died on December 24, 1930, at the age of 80.
