= William N. Barrett =

American politician and lawyer

William Nathan Barrett
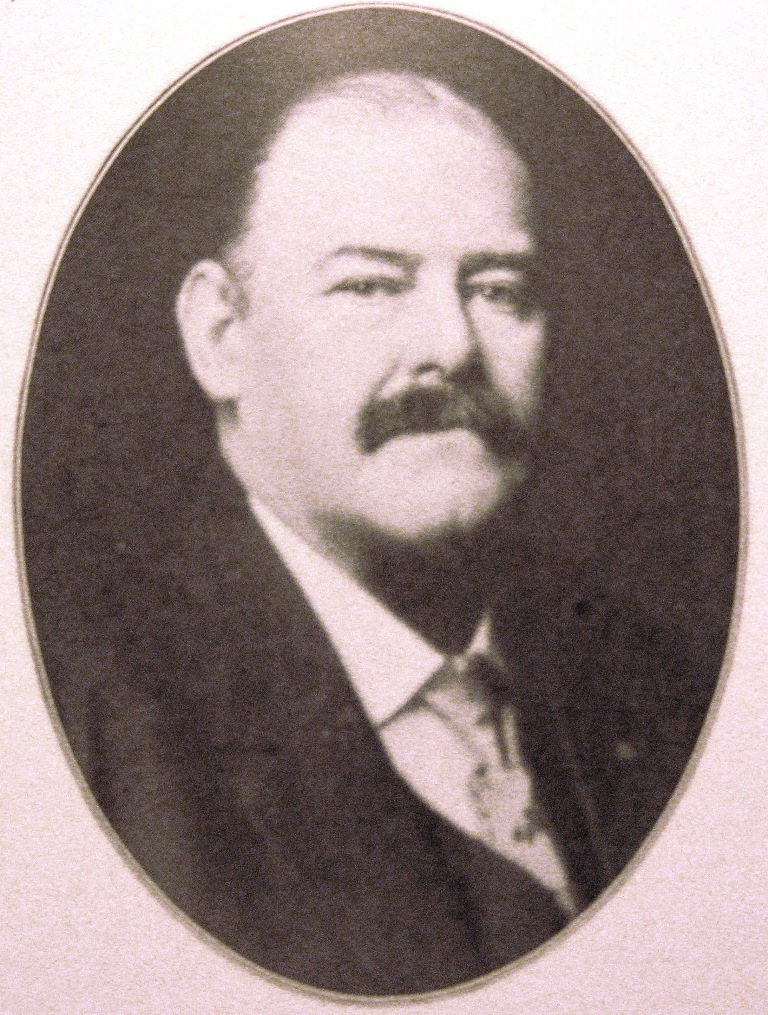
- Barrett circa 1910

Oregon State Senator
- In office 1909-1913
- Preceded by: E. W. Haines
- Succeeded by: W. D. Wood
- Constituency: Washington County

Member of the Oregon House of Representatives
- In office 1880-1881; 1891-1892; 1907-1908
- Constituency: Washington County

8th Mayor of Hillsboro, Oregon
- In office 1896-1899; 1902-1903; 1915-1916

Personal details
- Born: November 24, 1855 Washington County, Oregon
- Died: December 16, 1916 (aged 61) Hillsboro, Oregon
- Resting place: Hillsboro Pioneer Cemetery
- Party: Republican
- Spouse: Lucretia H. Parrish
- Education: Pacific University
- Occupation: Attorney

William Nathan Barrett (November 24, 1855 – December 16, 1916) was an American politician and lawyer in Oregon. A native of Washington County, he served in both chambers of the Oregon Legislative Assembly, including three different times in the Oregon House. A Republican, he was also a three time mayor of Hillsboro, Oregon.

== Early life ==
William Barrett was born in Washington County, Oregon, to Eliza Jane Barrett (née Purdin) and William R. Barrett on November 24, 1855. There he attended the local public schools before attending Tualatin Academy in Forest Grove, Oregon, for his secondary education. Barrett then attended the affiliated Pacific University and earned a Bachelor of Science degree in June 1879.

Following college he read law at the office of attorney and politician Thomas H. Tongue in Hillsboro. On November 18, 1882, he married Lucretia H. Parrish. After studying law he passed the bar in October 1884 and began practicing law. Barrett partnered with William D. Hare in a Hillsboro firm until 1886 when he opened his own office. In 1892, he created a partnership with Loring K. Adams, lasting until 1897 when he returned to a solo practice.

== Political career ==
Barrett would serve as a deputy district attorney for Washington County and later as district attorney for Oregon's fifth judicial district. In 1880, he served as a Republican in the Oregon House of Representatives serving Washington County. He returned to the House in 1891.

In 1896, he was elected as the 15th different person to be mayor of Hillsboro. Barrett was also the first to serve consecutive terms, holding office from December 8, 1896, until December 5, 1899. He then served on the city council from 1901 to 1902. After a few years away from the mayor's office, he returned as mayor and served from December 2, 1902, to December 15, 1903, when he was succeeded by Benjamin P. Cornelius.

Barrett returned to state politics in 1906 and was elected to the Oregon House to represent Washington County. The Republican was then elected to the Oregon State Senate in 1908 and served in the regular and special sessions of 1909. He continued his four-year term at the 1911 secession when his district included Washington, Yamhill, Lincoln, and Tillamook counties.

== Later years ==
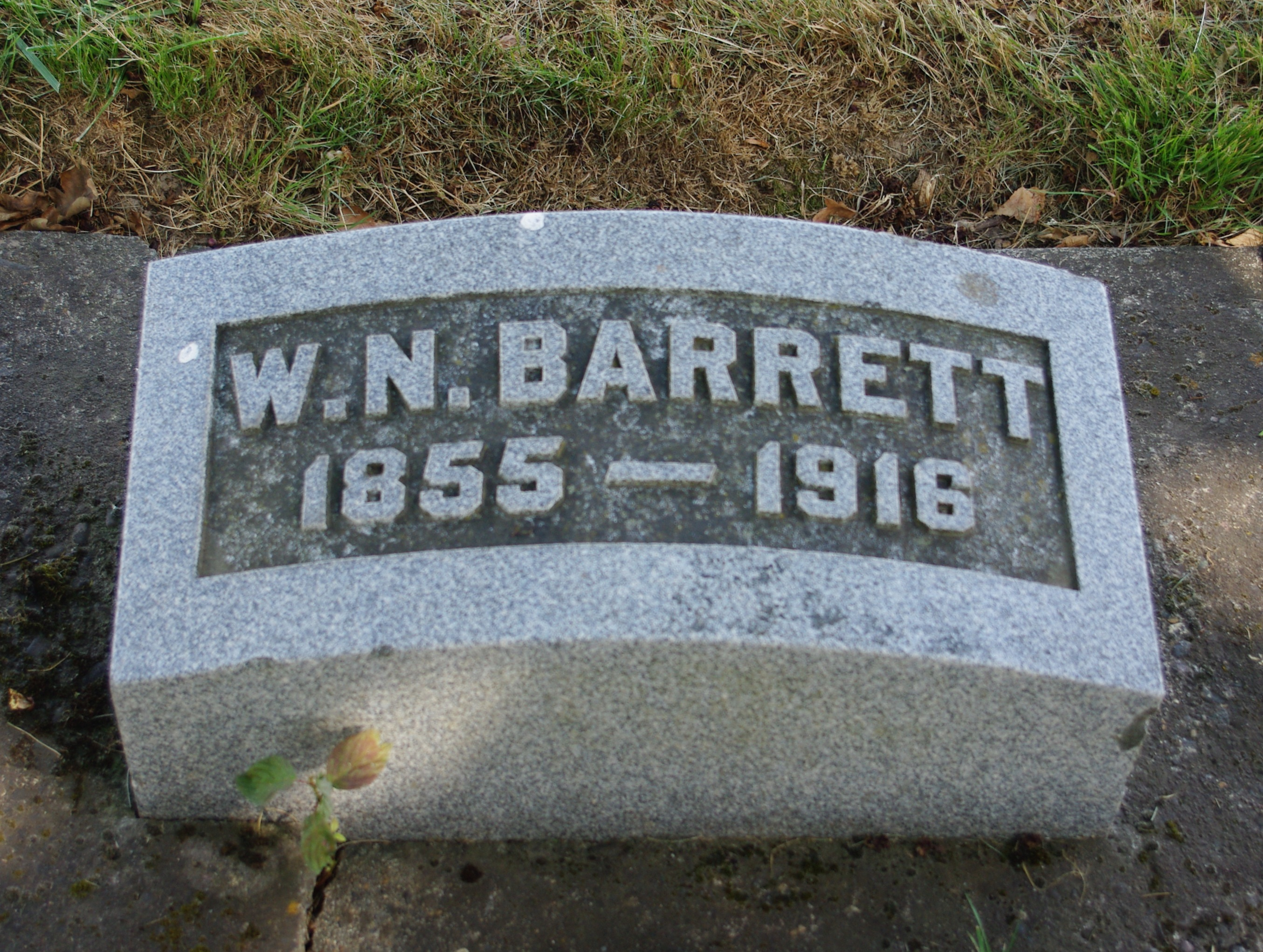
Barrett's headstone

In 1915, he returned to the office of mayor for Hillsboro, assuming the position on January 5 and serving until his death. He was a member of the Masonic Order and of the Knights of Pythias. William Nathan Barrett died on December 16, 1916, while in office, and was buried at the family's plot in the Hillsboro Pioneer Cemetery.
