= Thomas Tongue =

American judge

Thomas H. Tongue III

75th Justice of the Oregon Supreme Court
- In office 1969–1982
- Appointed by: Tom McCall
- Preceded by: Alfred T. Goodwin
- Succeeded by: Betty Roberts

Personal details
- Born: February 12, 1912 Hillsboro, Oregon, U.S.
- Died: May 31, 1994 (aged 82) Hillsboro, Oregon, U.S.
- Resting place: Hillsboro Pioneer Cemetery; 45.52012°N 123.00390°W
- Spouse: Bernice Healy Tongue

Thomas H. Tongue III (February 12, 1912 – May 31, 1994) was an American jurist in the state of Oregon. A native of the state, he served as the 75th justice of the Oregon Supreme Court, serving 13 years on the state's highest court. Tongue was the grandson of U.S. Representative Thomas H. Tongue, who was an emigrant from England in the early days of the state of Oregon.

== Early life ==
Justice Tongue was born in Hillsboro, Oregon, on February 12, 1912, to the Tongue legal family. He began college in 1930 and graduated with his undergraduate degree from the University of Oregon in 1934. He then attended the School of Law at the University of Oregon, graduating with a J.D. in 1937. While at Oregon he served as class president as an undergrad, and finished first in his class in law school. Also as an undergraduate he was a member of the Chi Psi fraternity. After the University of Oregon he went on to earn an advanced degree from Yale Law School. At Yale he earned a Doctor of the Science of Law while on the Yale Sterling Fellowship that he had obtained with the assistance of Dean Wayne Morse of Oregon’s law school.

== Legal career ==
Tongue began his career working in the New Deal government for the Labor Department, including arguing cases in front of the U.S. Supreme Court. Later he worked for the National War Labor Board and the University of Oregon before entering private practice in 1943 in Portland, Oregon. During his time in private practice, Tongue taught at the Northwestern College of Law. Additionally, he served on the Oregon State Bar’s board of governors, Oregon Labor Management Relations Board, and was chairperson of the Oregon Judicial Fitness Commission. In 1961, he received the State Bar's Award of Merit.

Tongue was appointed to the Oregon Supreme Court by Governor Tom McCall in 1969 to replace Alfred Goodwin who had resigned. Tongue was then elected to a full six-year term in 1970 and re-elected in 1976. Justice Tongue then resigned from the bench February 7, 1982. After retiring from the Oregon Supreme Court, Tongue continued to work as a senior judge for the state and as an arbitrator. In 1992, the Oregon State Bar Association granted him their President's Award. Tongue was president of the Multnomah Bar Association from 1976 to 1977.

=== Decisions authored ===
- Ruble Forest Products, Inc. v. Lancer Mobile Homes of Oregon, 269 Or. 315, 524 P.2d 1204 (1974) (contract law)
- Southworth v. Oliver, 284 Or. 361, 587 P.2d 994 (1978) (contract law)
- Oregon Bus. Planning Cncl. v. Dept. of Land Conservation and Development, 290 Or. 741, 626 P.2d 350 (1981) (land use)

== Later life and family ==
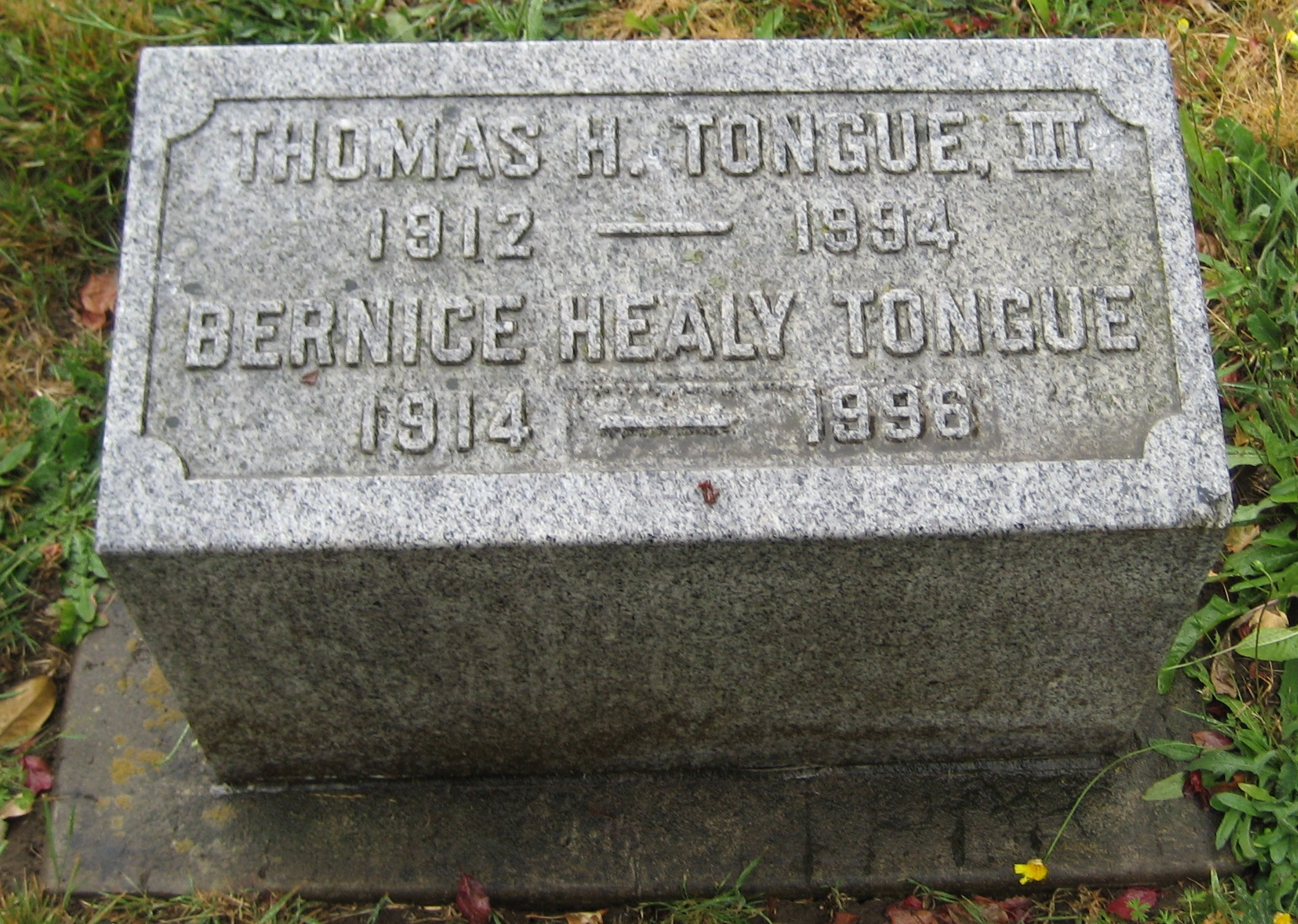
Tongue's grave marker

Justice Tongue was married to Bernice Healy. They had three sons: John Richard, James Cadwell, and Thomas Healy. Thomas H. Tongue III died May 31, 1994, in Hillsboro, Oregon and is buried at Hillsboro’s Pioneer Cemetery.
