= Yamhill County Transit =

Transport network in Oregon

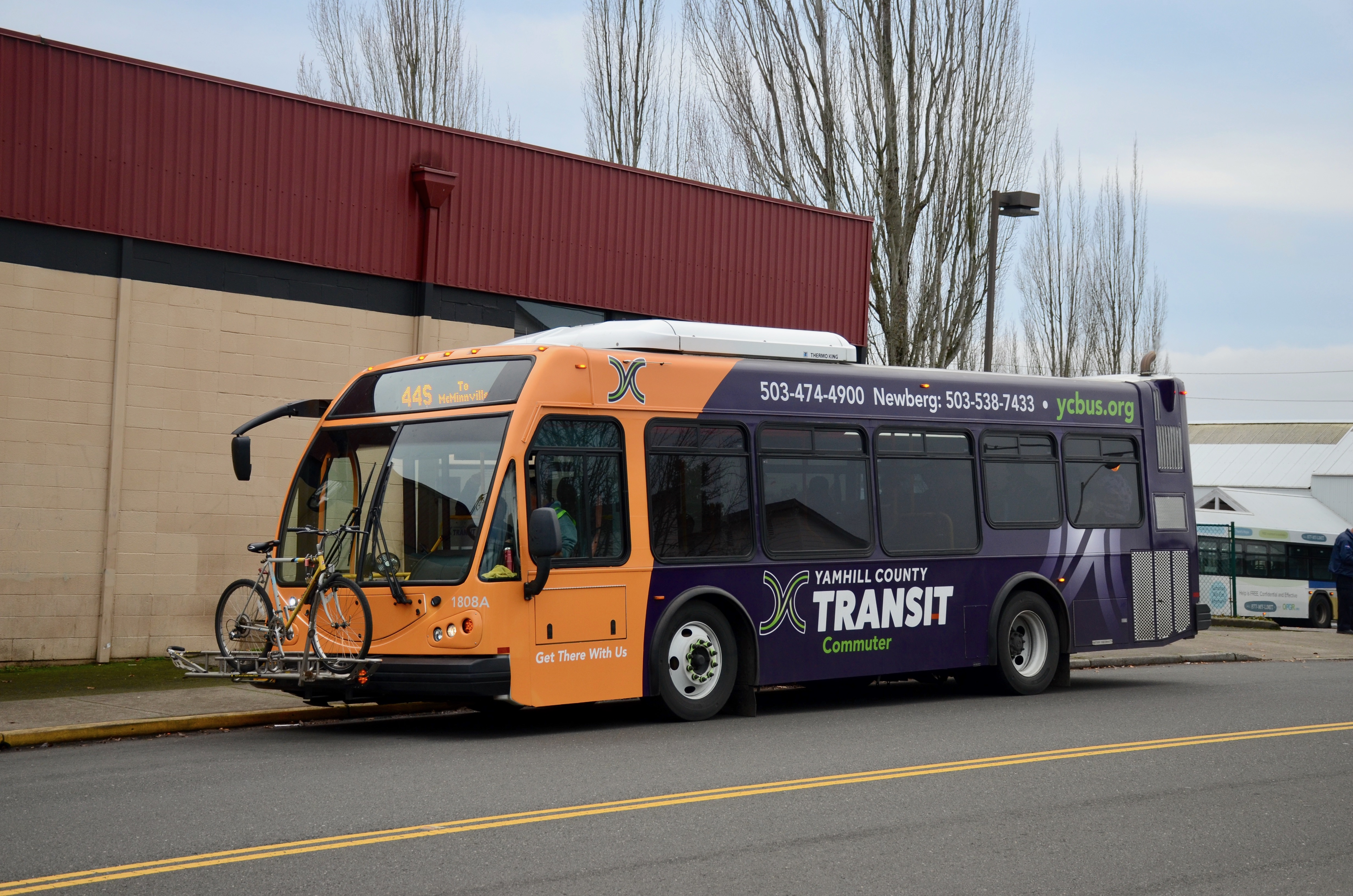
- A Yamhill County Transit bus in 2019
- Founded: March 14, 2007
- Locale: Yamhill County, Oregon, U.S.
- Service type: Bus service
- Routes: 11
- Website: ycbus.org

Yamhill County Transit, officially the Yamhill County Transit Area (YCTA), is the public transit authority of Yamhill County, Oregon, United States. It operates local bus routes in the cities of McMinnville, Sheridan and Newberg, as well as commuter bus routes to Hillsboro and Tigard in the Portland metropolitan area, Salem, and Grand Ronde.
