= William H. Wehrung =

American politician

William Henry Wehrung
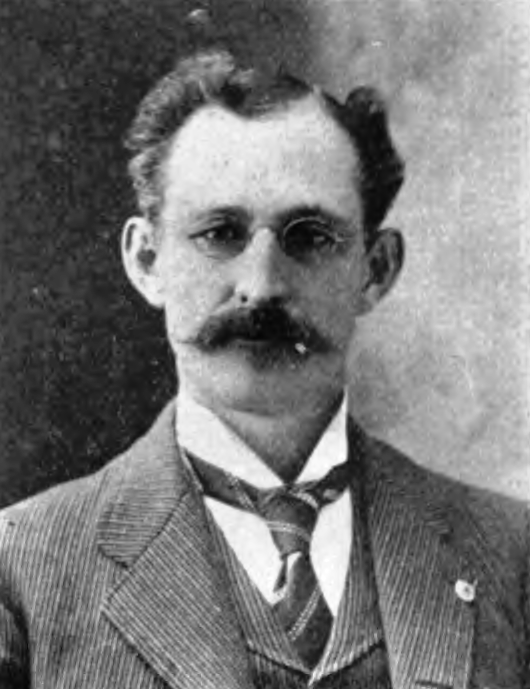
- Wehrung circa 1900

Oregon State Senator
- In office 1901–1905
- Succeeded by: E. W. Hines
- Constituency: Washington County

Member of the Hillsboro City Council
- In office 1885 – 1886; 1888 – 1889; 1895 – 1899

Personal details
- Born: March 22, 1861 Hillsboro, Oregon
- Died: September 30, 1934 (aged 73) Portland, Oregon
- Resting place: Hillsboro Pioneer Cemetery
- Party: Democrat
- Spouse: Mary Boscow

William Henry Wehrung (March 22, 1861 – September 30, 1934) was an American businessman and politician in the state of Oregon. A native Oregonian, he was a cabinetmaker, banker, and merchant in Hillsboro, Oregon. A member of the Democratic Party, he served in the Oregon State Senate and was a longtime member of the Hillsboro city council.

== Early life ==
William Wehrung was born on March 22, 1861, in Washington County, Oregon, at Hillsboro. His father Henry was a cabinet builder and merchant who immigrated to Oregon in 1852 from France, and his mother was Mary Catherine (née Emerick) Wehrung who moved to Oregon in 1848. Henry helped build the first courthouse in Hillsboro, and also built the Tualatin Hotel, the first hotel in Hillsboro, where William was born. William, one of four children in the family, was raised in Hillsboro on the family farm and attended the public schools in that city.

Wehrung also learned to build cabinets from his father, and worked in that profession from 1879 until 1882. He also worked with his father at his furniture store. Later the father operated the largest mercantile in the county, with William and his brother Gus later becoming partners with their father under the firm name of H. Wehrung & Sons. On June 25, 1885, William married Mary Boscow, daughter of Peter Boscow. The couple had two daughters, Ethel Gertrude and Alice Catherine.

== Political career ==
Wehrung entered politics when he was elected to the Hillsboro City Council (then known as the Board of Trustees) in 1885. He served on the council for a total of six terms from 1885 to 1886, 1888 to 1889, and 1895 to 1899. His father had served on the council in 1879 to 1880. The younger Wehrung also served at times as the president of the council, and was the clerk for the school district. Wehrung was also the chairman of the Democrat's central committee in Washington County.

On March 14, 1899, Wehrung was appointed to the state board of agriculture by Oregon Governor T. T. Geer. After four years on the board, Governor George Earle Chamberlain re-appointed Wehrung to the board in 1903. Wehrung also served as president of the board, and was responsible for holding the Oregon State Fair in Salem. He served a total of seven years on the board, and also traveled to St. Louis in 1904 to represent the state at the Louisiana Purchase Exposition. Additionally, he was the superintendent of agriculture and forestry at the Lewis and Clark Centennial Exposition in 1905 in Portland, Oregon, and a member of the commission that put on the Alaska–Yukon–Pacific Exposition in Seattle, Washington.

Politically a member of the Democratic Party, he was elected to the Oregon State Senate in June 1900 to a four-year term on the Union platform to represent Washington County, even though the county was predominately Republican. Wehrung served during the 1901 and 1903 legislative sessions representing District 15 and Hillsboro. He did not return to the senate and in 1905 E. W. Hines of Forest Grove took over the district.

== Later years ==
Wehrung organized the Hillsboro National Bank and served as president of the bank, which became the biggest in Washington County. In October 1910, he left the family business. In 1922, he was arrested after being indicted on charges of embezzlement by the United States Attorney over several transactions at his bank. A member of the Congregational Church, he was also a member civic groups including the Masons, the Benevolent and Protective Order of Elks, the Ancient Order of United Workmen, the Native Sons of Oregon, as well as the horticultural society in Oregon. He briefly served in the Oregon National Guard in the first regiment, and later was the president of the Hillsboro Board of Trade (chamber of commerce). William Henry Wehrung died in Portland on September 30, 1934, at the age of 73, and was buried at the Hillsboro Pioneer Cemetery.
