= Mary Ramsey Wood =

American pioneer and alleged supercentenarian

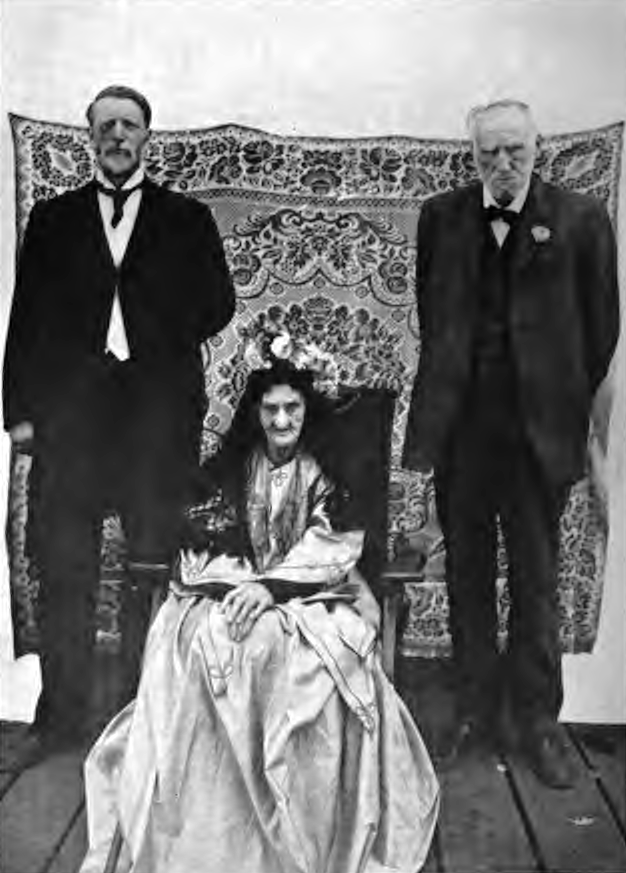
- Wood on July 26, 1907
- Born: May 20, 1787/circa 1810; Knoxville, Tennessee, US
- Died: January 1, 1908 (aged 120, disputed); Hillsboro, Oregon, US
- Resting place: Hillsboro Pioneer Cemetery; 45.52045°N 123.00599°W
- Known for: Supposed oldest living person
- Spouse(s): Jacob Lemons (died in 1839); John Wood (died in 1867)
- Children: 4

Mary Ramsey Wood, also known as Mary Ramsey Lemons Wood (May 20, 1787/circa 1810 (disputed) – January 1, 1908), was an American pioneer known as the "Mother Queen of Oregon". She was reported to be the oldest living person in the United States when she died, supposedly aged 120. It is said she traveled to the Oregon Territory across the Oregon Trail aged 66. There is evidence this age claim was inaccurate or exaggerated, however, and she may have been between 96 and 98 when she died.

== Biography ==
According to obituaries published in 1908, (Note: This section is based mainly on two 1908 obituaries for Mary Ramsey Wood and a 1906 story on the occasion of her birthday. These sources were likely mistaken about her being born in 1787, as described at #Longevity claim, thus, many of the age-related facts may be inaccurate.) Mary Ramsey was born on May 20, 1787, on a farm near Knoxville, Tennessee. The child of brickmaker Richard Ramsey and his wife, Catherine (née Gann), Mary Ramsey grew up in Tennessee. Her parents were born in England and immigrated to North America after they were married. In the American Colonies, they settled in Tennessee and raised ten children. Mary was the sixth child. Ramsey's mother was reported to have lived to the age of 110, and her father had died just a few years before his wife. Richard Ramsey built the first brick home in Knoxville, and the family was wealthy and owned slaves. In her early years Mary Ramsey danced with General Andrew Jackson, for whom her father fought in the War of 1812.

Aged 12, Ramsey joined the Methodist church, and in 1804 she married Jacob Lemons in Tennessee. The couple would raise four children on their farm in that state. The children were Mary Jane Lemons (1806–1904), Isaac Lemons (1809–1866), Nancy Ellen Lemons Bullock (1816–1868), and Catherine Bridgette Lemons Southworth Smith Reynolds (1830–1909). In 1837, the family moved to Alabama followed by Georgia the next year. In 1839, Jacob died, and in 1849 Mary Lemons moved to Missouri.

Lemons moved to the Oregon Territory with her daughters Nancy and Catherine and their families in 1852. The family brought 12 slaves with them to Oregon. Wood rode her horse Martha Washington Pioneer the entire journey along the Oregon Trail aged 66, and as a midwife she delivered at least one baby during the trip. The family arrived in Oregon in 1853, and settled in Washington County at Hillsboro in the Tualatin Valley. She married John Wood on May 28, 1854, in Hillsboro. He built the first frame hotel in Hillsboro, the Commercial Hotel, in which Mary tended bar at the in-house saloon.

Around 1865, the couple sold the hotel to Mary's daughter Catherine. John Wood died in 1867. Mary Wood then served as postmaster of Hillsboro before retiring to her daughter's residence. In 1879, she suffered from typhoid fever and lost the sight in her left eye. In 1904, she testified in a trial concerning a 40-year-old land deed, where she was noted for having a "keen" memory. In 1907, Wood was crowned as the first "Mother Queen" of Oregon by former Oregon Senator George Henry Williams and the president of the Oregon Pioneer Association, Joseph D. Lee. Henry L. Pittock presided over the ceremony on July 4, 1907, at which Wood was represented by a large photograph by Frederick H. Kiser due to her frailty; the story was reported nationally.

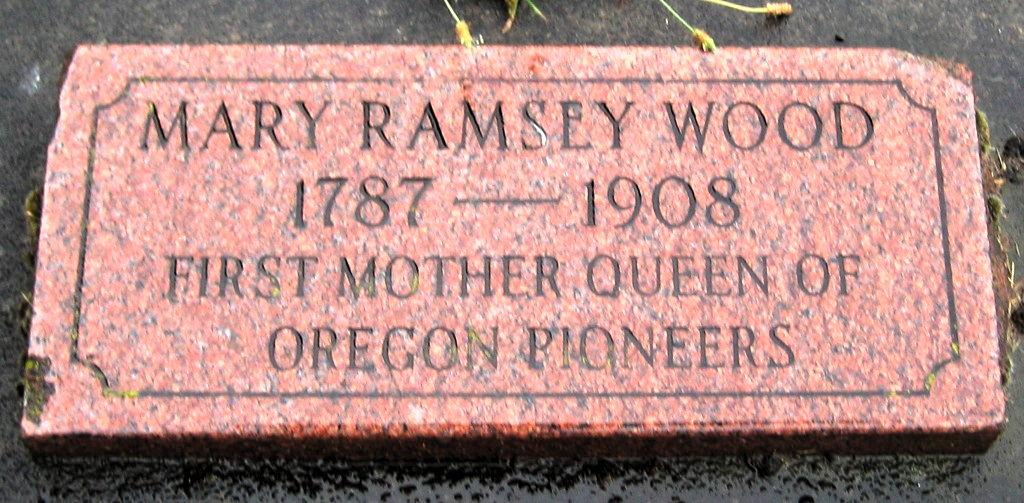
Wood's gravestone

According to obituaries of the time, "Grandma" Mary Ramsey Wood died aged 120 on January 1, 1908, at five o'clock in the morning. At the time of her death she was thought to be the oldest living person in the United States. She was also referred to as the "oldest Methodist in the world". Wood was buried at the Hillsboro Pioneer Cemetery. Her death and her supposed age were widely reported across the country at the time.

A 1908 Oregonian story, which claimed her age was authentic, stated that Wood's daughter had written to relatives in Missouri for a record of the family Bible. The reply, which the Oregonian claims was viewed by their reporter, excerpted the bible record that showed Wood's age would have been 120 the previous May. The letter, however, was lost and the relatives moved, making it "impossible" to contact the letter writer again. At the time of Wood's death, George Putnam, editor of the Capital Journal, republished a 1905 interview with Wood conducted when he worked for The Oregon Journal. He believed that she may have been the oldest woman in the world.

== Longevity claim ==
Although both historic and contemporary sources repeat the claim that Wood was 120 years old at the time of her death, according to United States Census records and modern longevity research, this longevity claim is highly likely to be false.

If Mary Ramsey Wood had lived to be 120, as claimed, she would have been the world's oldest person at that time, and would be the oldest American on record even today. That distinction, however, according to Guinness World Records, belongs to Sarah Knauss, who died at age 119.

=== Census data ===
In addition to the longevity records, census data may show a discrepancy between Mary Wood's claimed age at death and her actual age. Three U.S. census records for Hillsboro list a Mary Wood with data that match parts of Mary Ramsey Wood's biography. The 1860 Census lists a Mary Wood, aged 50, and a John Wood, aged 71, living in Hillsboro, alongside Charles and Nancy Bullock, aged 38 and 27 respectively. John's occupation is "landlord".

There is a Mary Wood listed in the 1880 Census for Hillsboro, with a stated age of 69. The Mary Wood listed in the census data was born in Tennessee and lived with her daughter, Catherine Smith. Her parents were from England.

The 1900 Census lists a Mary Wood with a birthdate of May 1809 (age 91) living with her daughter Catherine Reynolds, whose birthdate was October 1832 (age 67), in Hillsboro. The Mary Wood in the 1900 census was born in Tennessee with parents born in England. Although Mary Ramsey Wood was called a "great reader", the Mary Wood in the 1900 census could not read or write.

If the Mary Wood listed in the 1860, 1880, and 1900 censuses is the same person as Mary Ramsey Wood, then, owing to a slight discrepancy in the stated ages, she would have been between 96 and 98 years old at the time of her death.

== Legacy ==
Wood's hotel, at the northwest corner of 2nd and Washington streets, burned down in 1912. Today the HART Theatre is located on the site. The nearby Hillsboro Civic Center has an informational plaque in its plaza about Wood. In 2005, it was proposed that a fountain at the civic center be named for Wood.

January 1, 2008, was named Mary Ramsey Wood Day by the City of Hillsboro. Local historian James Andrew Long advocated for this recognition of Wood.

Modern news stories about Wood, published as recently as 2014, mention that there is some dispute about her age at death but continue to state her age of 120 years at her death as fact.
