= Albert E. Tozier =

- Born: March 7, 1860; Nebraska
- Died: June 27, 1937 (aged 77); Portland, Oregon, United States
- Resting place: Hillsboro Pioneer Cemetery; 45.52030°N 123.00542°W
- Occupation(s): Newspaper publisher Historian
- Notable credit: Chehalis Nugget
- Family: Charles T. Tozier

Albert E. Tozier (March 7, 1860 – June 27, 1937) was an American newspaper editor and local historian in Oregon. A native of Nebraska, he moved to Oregon as a child with his parents, settling in Hillsboro. His father, Charles T. Tozier, served as mayor of the town and in the Oregon Legislative Assembly. Albert worked as editor of The Hillsboro Argus and curator of the museum at Champoeg.

== Early life ==
Albert Tozier was born in Cass County, Nebraska, to Charles and Zerilda Tozier on March 7, 1860. Of French descent, the Tozier family immigrated to North America and settled in Nova Scotia before moving to the United States. The family traveled overland with a team of oxen to Oregon via the Oregon Trail in 1863, settling in Washington County near Hillsboro. There Tozier attended Tualatin Academy preparatory school in neighboring Forest Grove where he graduated in 1881. In 1872, he rang the bell at the Hillsboro Methodist Church on New Year's Eve to announce the new year. He returned to do this for 64 consecutive years, traveling from as far away as New York City and South America to keep his streak alive.

== Newspapers and historian ==
In 1883, he founded the Lewis County Nugget newspaper with his cousin. Based in Lewis County, Washington, in the town of Chehalis, the paper was later known as the Chehalis Nugget. In 1885, Tozier became the editor and part owner of the Hillsboro Independent newspaper (now The Hillsboro Argus) and remained until 1887. Also in 1885, he helped to found the National Editorial Association, and later served one year as the organization's president.

Tozier served as secretary of the Oregon Press Association for 15 years. By 1906, he was working for the Farmer paper based in Portland. He also collected many artifacts concerning Oregon's history in association with his sister Edith, and served as keeper of the historical artifacts at what became Champoeg State Park when it was a museum of the Oregon Historical Society.

== Later years ==
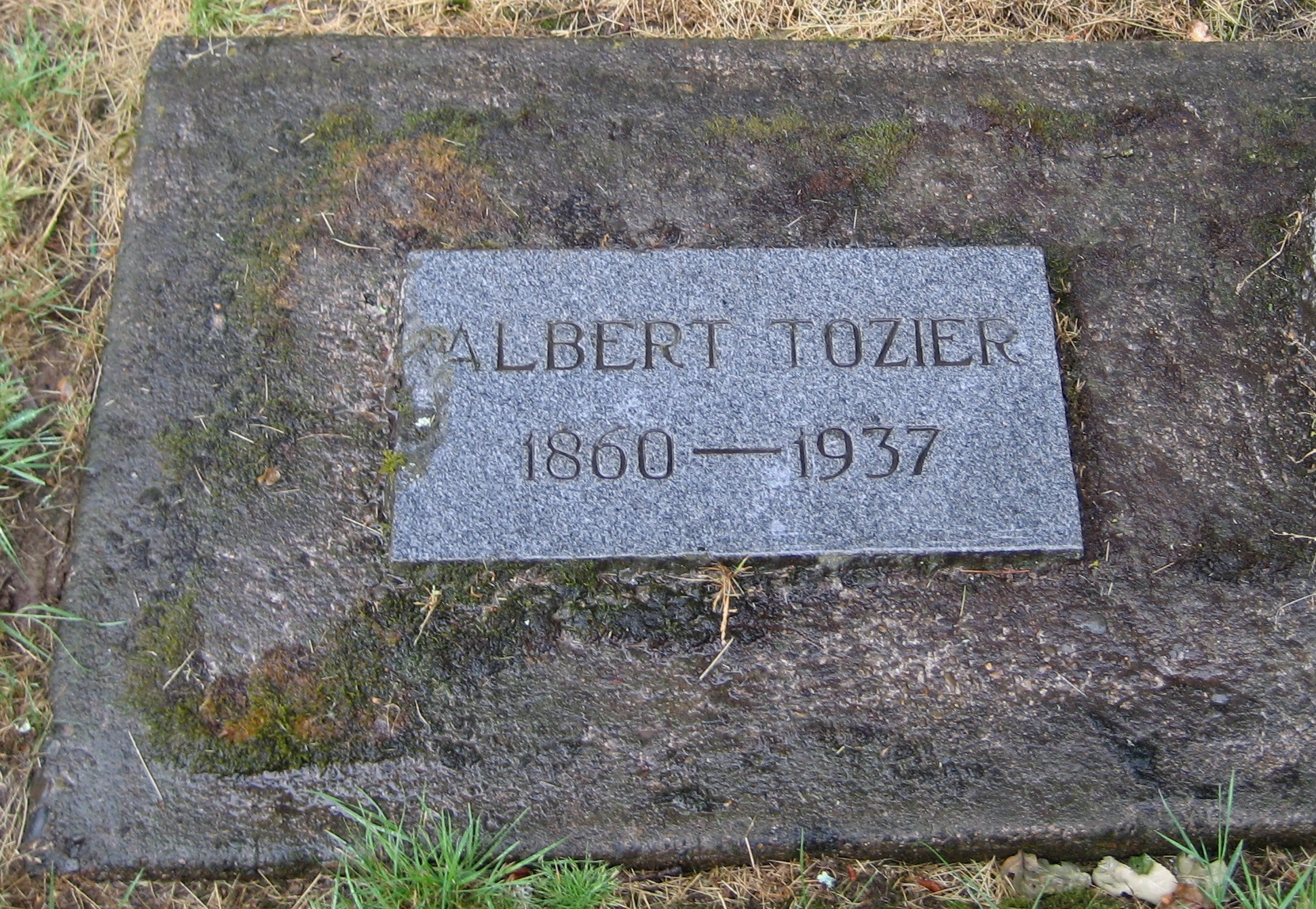
Tozier's grave marker

In the early 1930s, Tozier donated his collection of historical items, which included books, pictures, maps, and other items to the county historical society. The collection was this basis for what became the Washington County Museum. In 1936, poor health kept him from ringing the bell at the Methodist Church, ending the 64-year tradition. Tozier died on June 27, 1937, at the age of 77 and was buried at Hillsboro Pioneer Cemetery.
