= Samuel B. Huston =

American politician

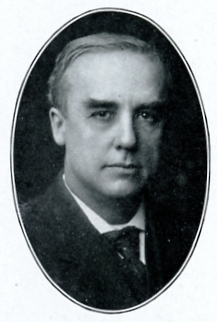

Oregon State Senator
- In office 1893–1897; 1917–1921
- Constituency: Washington County; Multnomah County

Member of the Oregon House of Representatives
- In office 1915–1917
- Constituency: Multnomah County

11th Mayor of Hillsboro, Oregon
- In office 1889–1890; 1894–1895
- Preceded by: S. T. Linklater; Joseph C. Hare
- Succeeded by: F. A. Bailey; R. B. Goodin

Personal details
- Born: March 16, 1858 New Philadelphia, Indiana
- Died: November 30, 1920 (aged 62)
- Party: Democrat, then Republican
- Spouse: Ella Geiger
- Education: Northern Indiana University
- Profession: Attorney

Samuel Bruce Huston (March 16, 1858 – November 30, 1920) was an American politician and lawyer in Oregon. Originally a Democrat and later a Republican, he served in both chambers of the Oregon Legislative Assembly and was twice the mayor of Hillsboro, Oregon. A native of Indiana, he served in the state senate as a Democrat from one county his first term, but moved and changed parties by his second term 20 years later.

== Early life ==
Samuel Huston was born in New Philadelphia, Washington County, Indiana on March 16, 1858, to Oliver Wolcott Huston and Lucretia Pearson Huston (née Naugle). His father died while Samuel was young, with his mother remarrying in 1866. The family moved from the southern Indiana town to Illinois, where Samuel received his education at a private school and the public schools in Grand Glade.

Huston earned his college education at Northern Indiana University (now Valparaiso University) in Valparaiso. Afterwards he moved to Chicago where he attended a law school before reading law with George M. Parker in Robinson, Illinois, and at the law offices of Heffron & Zaring in Salem, Indiana. He was admitted to the Indiana bar in December 1879 before entering private legal practice in that state. Huston then briefly practiced law in Illinois before working for the Santa Fe Railroad Company in New Mexico, remaining until the Spring of 1883. He then moved to Oregon, arriving on May 7, 1883, in Portland.

Settling for a short time in Forest Grove where he worked in a flour mill and on a farm, he moved to neighboring Hillsboro in January 1884 and set up a law practice. On June 28, 1884, in Forest Grove, he married Ella Geiger, the daughter of Dr. William Geiger Jr. of pioneer stock. He was admitted to Oregon's bar in October 1884. In 1894, they had a son, Grover Clay, who died five months after birth. Another son, Oliver, attended the University of Oregon and Yale University. The couple had two other children, Samuel Carl and Blanche. In Hillsboro he served for 12 years as a school director.

In 1906, he moved to Portland, where he continued to practice law and served as a member of the city's commercial club. In 1906, Huston and Martin L. Pipes represented a defendant in the Oregon land fraud scandal with Francis J. Heney as the prosecutor and Charles E. Wolverton presiding in Oregon's federal court. Huston was involved with other cases of the land fraud as well as more than ten murder trials, primarily as a defense attorney.

== Political career ==
Huston entered politics in 1887 when he was elected to the Hillsboro city council, serving until 1888. In 1889, he won the election for mayor of the city, the eleventh person to serve as mayor of Washington County's seat, he was in office from December 2, 1889, until December 5, 1890. In 1892, Huston was elected to a four-year term in the Oregon State Senate. A Democrat at the time, he represented District 29 and Washington County, serving through the 1895 session. During this time he also served as mayor of Hillsboro a second term from December 4, 1894, until December 5, 1895. He then served on the city council from 1901 to 1902.

In 1914, he was elected to the Oregon House, representing Multnomah County, now as a Republican. He left the Democratic Party due to the party's views on the silver question and how U.S. currency was backed. Huston then returned to the Oregon Senate after election in 1916. He represented District 13 and Multnomah County, and served in the 1919 regular session and 1920 special session as a Republican.

== Later years ==
During his later life, Huston served as a director at the Oregon Historical Society. On November 30, 1920, Samuel Huston died of a heart attack while in the Federal Courthouse in Portland in Judge Charles E. Wolverton's courtroom while waiting for a trial to resume from the lunch recess. Age 62 when he died, Huston was buried at River View Cemetery in Portland.
