= Charles T. Tozier =

American politician

Member of the Oregon House of Representatives
- In office 1876-1878
- Constituency: Washington County

2nd Mayor of Hillsboro, Oregon
- In office 1877-1878
- Preceded by: A. Luelling
- Succeeded by: A. M. Collins

Personal details
- Born: November 7, 1832 Manchester, Indiana
- Died: July 6, 1899 (aged 66) Idaho
- Party: Republican
- Spouse(s): Caroline Miner; Zerilda Mayfield

Charles True Tozier (November 7, 1832 – July 6, 1899) was an American politician in the state of Oregon. A native of Indiana, he moved to Oregon in 1863 and served as the second mayor of the city of Hillsboro and in the Oregon House of Representatives.

== Early years ==
Charles Tozier was born on November 7, 1832, in Manchester, Indiana. He was married to Caroline Miner, who died in 1857; he then married Zerilda Mayfield (December 22, 1841 – March 31, 1912) on August 1, 1858, in Nebraska. Tozier had one child by his first wife, and five with his second wife. The children were Edith, Nellie, LeRoy, Rozella, and Albert E. Tozier, the latter a newspaper editor and historian.

== Oregon ==
In 1863, the family, which consisted of Charles, Zerilda, Rozella, and Albert, immigrated overland to Oregon via the Oregon Trail. The family settled in Washington County. From July 1872, to July 1876 he was the sheriff of the county. In 1876, Tozier was elected to a two-year term in the Oregon House of Representatives as a Republican representing the county during the 1876 legislative session. He also was on Hillsboro's first city council that year, serving from 1876 to 1877. In 1877, he was elected as the second mayor of the city, which is the county seat and incorporated in 1876. Tozier was mayor from December 10, 1877, to December 3, 1878. Charles T. Tozier died in Wallace, Idaho, on July 6, 1899, and is buried at Hillsboro Pioneer Cemetery.
