= Thomas H. Tongue =

American politician (1844–1903)

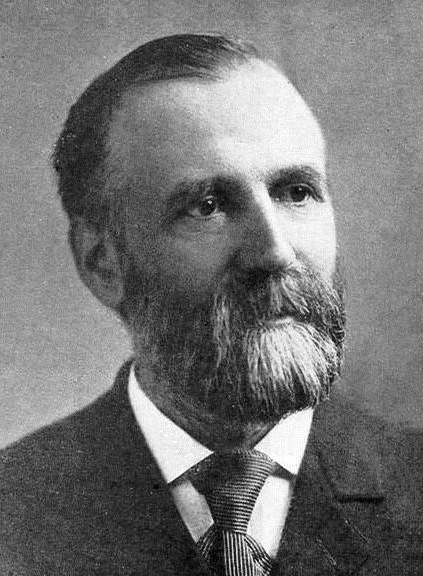

Member of the U.S. House of Representatives from Oregon's 1st district
- In office March 4, 1897 – January 11, 1903
- Preceded by: Binger Hermann
- Succeeded by: Binger Hermann

7th Mayor of Hillsboro, Oregon
- In office December 13, 1882 – December 10, 1883; December 13, 1886 – December 9, 1887

Personal details
- Born: June 23, 1844 Lincolnshire, England, U.K.
- Died: January 11, 1903 (aged 58) Washington, D.C., U.S.
- Resting place: Hillsboro Pioneer Cemetery; 45.52015°N 123.00382°W
- Party: Republican
- Spouse: Emily Margaret Eagleton

Thomas H. Tongue (June 23, 1844 – January 11, 1903) was an American politician and attorney in the state of Oregon. Born in England, his family immigrated to Washington County, Oregon, in 1859. In Oregon, he would serve in the State Senate from 1889 to 1893 and was the seventh mayor of Hillsboro. A Republican, he was chairman of the state party, and national convention delegate in 1892. Tongue served as Congressman from 1897 to 1903 representing Oregon's 1st congressional district.

== Early life ==
Thomas H. Tongue was born in Lincolnshire, England, on June 23, 1844. He attended the public schools of England before immigrating to the United States with his parents. The family settled in Washington County, Oregon, in the Tualatin Valley on November 23, 1859. His parents Rebecca and Anthony Tongue had a house west of North Plains.

In Oregon, Tongue attended the Tualatin Academy preparatory school in nearby Forest Grove. He then enrolled at Pacific University, a college affiliated with Tualatin Academy, and graduated from the school in June 1868. After graduating he moved to Hillsboro, the county seat of Washington County, where he studied law. On December 25, 1869, he married Emily Margaret Eagleton, daughter of George Eagleton.

== Career ==
Tongue was admitted to the Oregon State Bar in 1870 and began private legal practice in Hillsboro. While practicing law he was also a farmer and raised livestock while a member of the Knights of Pythias and Odd Fellows. Also a member of the Masonic Order, he served as a grand master in that organization. Tongue started his political career as mayor of Hillsboro, serving two terms. He was elected in 1882 as the seventh person to hold that office, serving from December 13, 1882, to December 10, 1883. He would serve a second term three years later from December 13, 1886, to December 9, 1887.

In 1884, he purchased the former fairgrounds where the Washington County Fair had been held for approximately 15 years. The 50 acres (200,000 m^{2}) were south of First Avenue and Baseline in present-day downtown Hillsboro, with Tongue using the land for his hobby farm. In 1888, Tongue was elected to a four-year term in the Oregon State Senate. Serving in both the 1889 and 1891 sessions, the Republican represented District 27 and Washington County. While in the State Senate he was selected as the chairperson of the judiciary committee. He replaced William D. Hare as both mayor and state senator.

A Republican Party official, Tongue served on the party's state central committee from 1886 to 1896. In 1890, he was elected to the post of chairman for the Republican state convention and followed that position as president of the state party from 1892 to 1894. In 1892, Oregon received a second congressional district, and Tongue served as the Republican party's chairman for the district until 1896. Also in 1892, Tongue served as a delegate to the Republican National Convention held in Minneapolis, Minnesota, and served as the vice president of the Oregon delegation to the convention in 1894.

== Congress ==
Thomas Tongue was elected in 1896 as a Republican to the 55th Congress from Oregon's 1st congressional district. Replacing Binger Hermann, Tongue won by a total of 63 votes over his opponents. He was re-elected three times and served in the 56th and 57th United States Congresses. Tongue also won re-election in 1902 to the 58th Congress, but died before that session began. In the 1898 campaign he defeated three opponents led by Fusion Party candidate Robert M. Veatch, winning by 2,037 votes over Veatch. Tongue won by 3,100 votes in 1900 and by 7,318 votes in the 1902 campaign.

On March 4, 1897, he began serving in the United States House of Representatives and remained until his death in Washington, D.C., on January 11, 1903, before the start of what would have been a fourth term. In Congress, Tongue was chairman of the Committee on Irrigation of Arid Lands during both the 56th and 57th Congresses. He served alongside William R. Ellis and Malcolm Adelbert Moody as Oregon's House delegates. While in Congress, Tongue advocated for the creation of a national park for Crater Lake in Southern Oregon. He introduced bills to create the park in 1898, 1899, and finally in 1901 when the bill was passed by Congress. In May 1902, Crater Lake National Park became the United States' fifth national park when President Theodore Roosevelt signed the bill into law.

Tongue's death in 1903 was unexpected, and was reported as heart failure. After Tongue's death, Binger Hermann, who Tongue succeeded in Congress, was elected to complete Tongue's term. Thomas Brackett Reed, Speaker of the House during Tongue's first two terms, considered Tongue "one of the seven ablest men in the House."

== Family ==
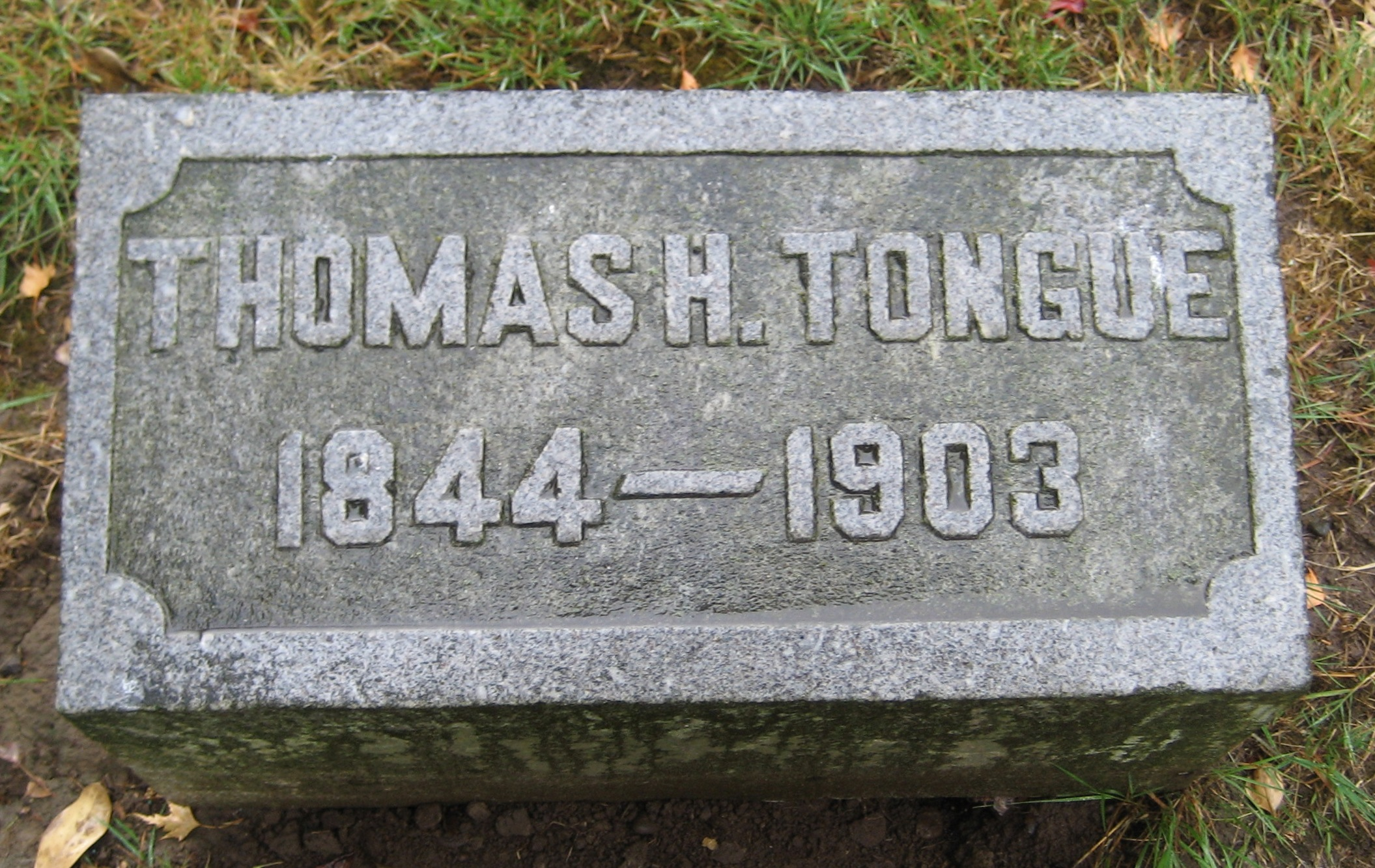
Tongue's grave marker

Tongue and his wife, the former Emily M. Eagleton, had eight children: Edmund Burke Tongue, Edwin Tongue, Mary G. Lombard, Thomas H. Tongue Jr., Elizabeth Fey, Florence Munger, Bertha Rebecca Tongue, and Edith. Edith married Alfred E. Reames, who would serve in the United States Senate. Thomas Tongue Jr. and Edmund both became lawyers, with the older Edmund forming a legal partnership with his father in 1897. Congressman Tongue was buried in Hillsboro, Oregon, at the family's private plot next to the Masonic Cemetery (now Pioneer Cemetery). Tongue was the grandfather of Thomas H. Tongue III (1912 – 1994), who served as an associate justice of the Oregon Supreme Court.

== See also ==
- List of members of the United States Congress who died in office (1900–1949)

U.S. House of Representatives
| Preceded by Binger Hermann | U.S. Representative of Oregon's 1st congressional district 1897–1903 | Succeeded by Binger Hermann |
