= William G. Hare =

American politician

William Gilman Hare
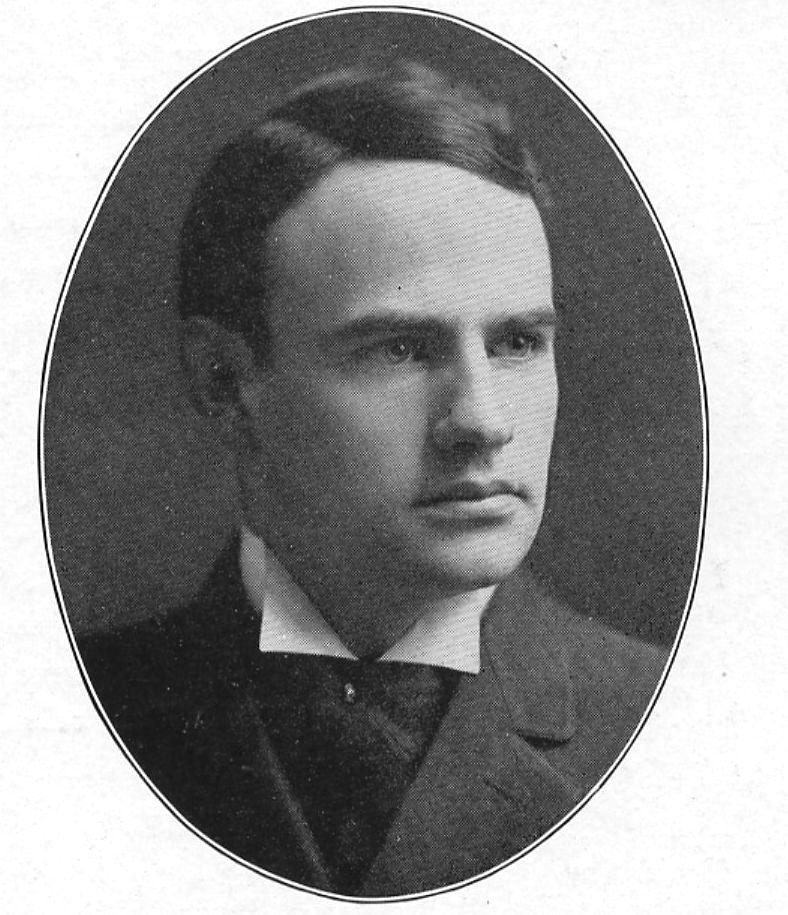
- Hare in 1910

Member of the Oregon House of Representatives
- In office 1915–1917; 1919–1921
- Constituency: Washington County

Oregon State Senator
- In office 1921–1929
- Constituency: Washington County

Personal details
- Born: April 19, 1882 Farmington, Oregon
- Died: November 25, 1971 (aged 89) Hillsboro, Oregon
- Party: Republican
- Spouse: Jane Greer
- Education: Pacific University; University of Michigan Law School

William G. Hare (April 19, 1882 – November 25, 1971) was an American lawyer and politician in the state of Oregon. A native Oregonian, he grew up in the Hillsboro area where he later practiced law. A Republican, he served in both houses of the Oregon Legislature, as had his father William D. Hare. His brother Joseph was once the mayor of Hillsboro.

== Early life ==
William Gilman Hare was born in Farmington, Oregon, south of Hillsboro on April 19, 1882. He was the son of attorney and politician William Davenport and Henrietta (née Scholfield) Hare, and brother to Joseph, Frances Ellen, Martha G., Henrietta, and Ruth. William was educated in the public schools of Hillsboro before attending preparatory school at Tualatin Academy in neighboring Forest Grove in 1900. In 1903, he graduated from Pacific University, the college division of the academy, with a bachelor's degree.

Hare then graduated from the University of Michigan Law School in Ann Arbor in 1906 with a bachelor of laws degree. Hare returned to Oregon, passed the bar, and was admitted to practice on August 21, 1907, by the state supreme court in Salem. He settled in Hillsboro where he formed a legal partnership with later judge George R. Bagley.

== Political career ==
His father, William Davenport Hare, served in both houses of the Oregon Legislative Assembly and as mayor of Hillsboro. His brother Joseph also served as mayor. William was elected as a Republican to the Oregon House of Representatives in 1914 to serve Hillsboro and Washington County in District 15. After one session off, he won election to his old seat in 1918 and served in the 1919 session. In 1920, he was elected to a four-year term in the Oregon State Senate representing District 11. Hare won re-election in 1924 to a second four-year term and remained in office through the 1927 session. A son later served in the Senate as well, representing the same district.

== Later years and family ==
Hare was a member of the Knights of Pythias, the Masons, the Benevolent and Protective Order of Elks, the Odd Fellows, and the Rotary Club. He married Jane M. Greer of Hillsboro on November 25, 1906, and they had two children; one son (John) and one daughter. After nearly 60 years in legal practice, he retired in 1965. William Gilman Hare died on November 25, 1971, at the age of 89 at Tuality Community Hospital in Hillsboro. The Hillsboro School District's athletic complex, Hare Field, was named for him.
