= William D. Hare =

American politician (1834–1910)

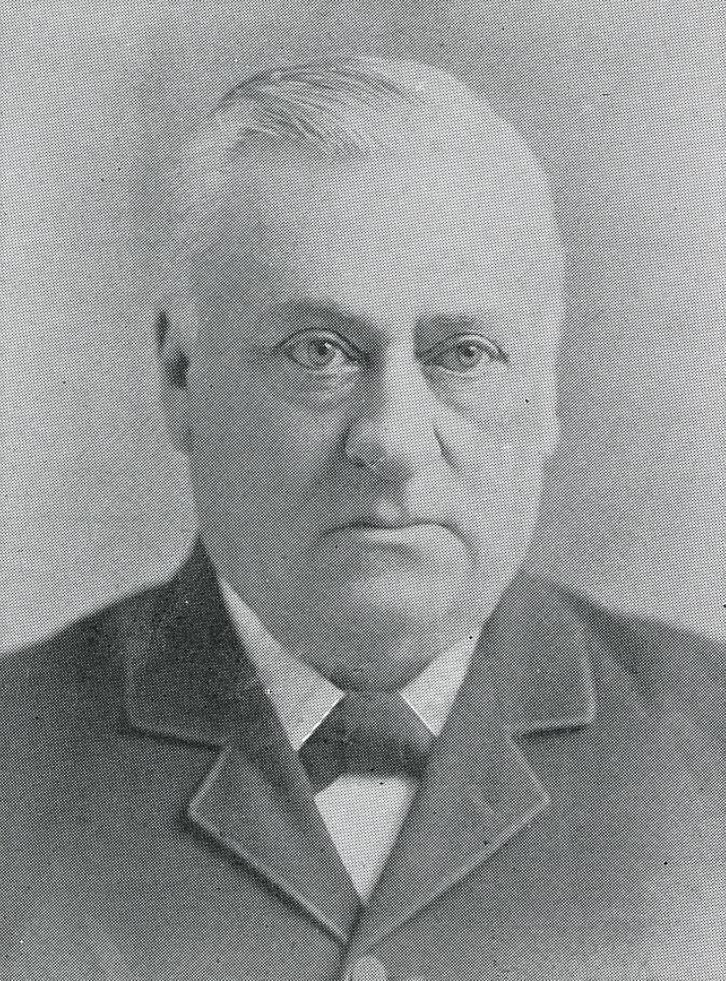

Member of the Oregon Senate from the 28th district
- In office 1885–1889
- Preceded by: R. H. Tyson
- Succeeded by: Thomas H. Tongue

8th Mayor of Hillsboro, Oregon
- In office December 14, 1885 – December 13, 1886
- Preceded by: Rodolph Crandall
- Succeeded by: Thomas H. Tongue

Personal details
- Born: September 1, 1834 Wheeling, Virginia
- Died: February 6, 1910 (aged 75) Hillsboro, Oregon
- Resting place: Hillsboro Pioneer Cemetery; 45.52032°N 123.005922°W
- Party: Republican
- Spouse(s): Henrietta Scholfield; Mary A. Anthony
- Relations: John Davenport
- Children: Joseph C. Hare; Frances Ellen Hare; Martha G. Hare; Henrietta Hare; Ruth Hare; William G. Hare

William Davenport Hare (September 1, 1834 – February 6, 1910) was an American politician in Oregon. He served as a Republican member of the Oregon Legislature and the 8th mayor of Hillsboro, Oregon. His other duties included those of customs collector and presidential elector. A native of what was Virginia, his grandfather was a member of the United States Congress, while several of his descendants would also serve in the Oregon Legislature.

== Early life ==
A native of Wheeling, Virginia (after 1863, West Virginia), William Hare was born September 1, 1834, the eldest of nine children of the Reverend Joseph Hare and his wife, the former Frances Ellen Davenport. Hare's paternal grandfather emigrated from England and settled in Ohio. His maternal grandfather was Congressman John Davenport. In 1853, as he was turning 19, William embarked upon the transcontinental journey to the Oregon Territory across the Oregon Trail with Jesse Edwards, who would settle in Benton County.

Hare first settled in Portland, Oregon, where he worked as a purser on the steamship Fashion for three years. In that position he also spent time as the captain and pilot of the boat. In 1857, he moved to Hillsboro to take a job copying records for the county. The records were copied for parts of the county that were split-off from Washington County and added to Multnomah County. Hare completed the job in under a year and was subsequently made county auditor.

== Politics ==
In 1858, Hare started a long political career when he was elected county clerk for Washington County and won re-election in 1860 and 1862. During his time in office, he studied law, passed the bar in 1864, and began private practice in his own office in Hillsboro. In 1870, he served in the Oregon House of Representatives as a Republican representing Washington County, his only session in the House. Hare was a presidential elector in 1872, and received an appointment from President Grant to be the customs collector for Astoria, Oregon. He remained in that position for eight years, and when his term expired in 1881, returned to his law practice in Hillsboro.

In 1884, Hare was elected as a Republican to the Oregon State Senate to represent District 28 in Washington County—he also served in the 1885 special session of the legislature. Hare joined William N. Barrett to form a legal firm in 1884, with the two remaining partners until 1886. After serving in the 1887 session he was replaced by fellow Republican Thomas H. Tongue. Hare was also elected that year as the mayor of Hillsboro to replace Rodolph Crandall. After his one-year term ended on December 13, 1886, his successor was, once again, future Congressman and his senate replacement Thomas H. Tongue.

== Family ==
In 1859, William D. Hare married Henrietta Scholfield, and they had six children—Joseph C. Hare, Frances Ellen Hare, Martha G. Hare, Henrietta Hare, Ruth Hare, and William G. Hare who also served in the legislature. Scholfield, who died in 1890, was the sister of Illinois Supreme Court Justice John Scholfield. After her death, Hare's second marriage was to Mary A. Anthony in 1893, and she died in 1908. She was a cousin of Susan B. Anthony. He was a member of the Masonic Order and the Ancient Order of United Workmen. As a Mason, he was selected as Grand Master of the Oregon chapter in 1871. William Davenport Hare died in his home in Hillsboro on February 6, 1910, at the age of 75 and was buried at the Hillsboro Pioneer Cemetery.
