= Tom Hughes (Oregon politician) =

American politician (born 1943)

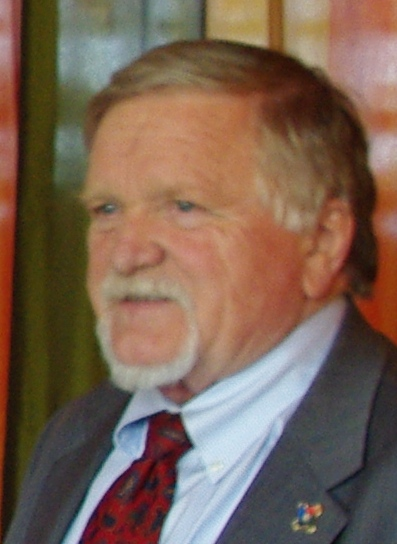
- Hughes in 2010

President of the Metro Council
- In office 2011–2019
- Preceded by: David Bragdon
- Succeeded by: Lynn Peterson
- Constituency: Metro, the Portland (Oregon) metropolitan area

Mayor of Hillsboro, Oregon
- In office 2001–2009
- Preceded by: Gordon Faber
- Succeeded by: Jerry Willey

Member of the Hillsboro City Council
- In office 1977–1980

Personal details
- Born: 1943 (age 82–83) Hillsboro, Oregon, U.S.
- Spouse: Gayle Hughes
- Education: University of Oregon; University of Arizona
- Occupation: Consultant
- Profession: Educator

Tom Hughes (born 1943) is an American politician and former educator. He was the president of Metro, a regional government in the Portland metropolitan area, from 2011 to 2019, and was the mayor of his home town of Hillsboro from 2001 to 2009. He served on the city's planning commission and city council. During his time as mayor, the city built the Hillsboro Civic Center as the new city hall, with the exterior plaza being named in his honor after he left office.

Hughes was a public school teacher for 30 years and taught in Aloha. He also briefly worked as a consultant for a law firm.

== Early life ==
Tom Hughes was born in Hillsboro, Washington County, Oregon, in 1943. He is the older brother of John Hughes, an educator in the Pacific Northwest. After spending some time in Eastern Oregon at a logging camp where his father was the bookkeeper, the family moved back to Hillsboro in 1952. He was raised in that city and attended Hillsboro High School, where he graduated in 1961. In 1965, he graduated from the University of Oregon in Eugene with a Bachelor of Science degree in history. He originally planned to become a chemistry teacher, but switched to history. Two years later he earned a Master of Arts degree in history from the University of Arizona in Tucson.

After college, he spent some time in San Francisco, California, where he sold roofing material before returning to Oregon. Back in Oregon, he began teaching first as a substitute teacher, and later as a full-time teacher in the Beaverton School District. He also received a teaching certificate from Portland State University. Hughes was married about 1969 to Gayle, and they had two daughters named Kristen and Karen.

Hughes taught at Aloha High School beginning in 1973 and taught a variety of social studies subjects. As a teacher he taught government and helped organize the Model Democratic Presidential Nominating Convention beginning in 1972. In 2003, Hughes retired from teaching at Aloha High School. Hughes is also a member of the Rotary Club and the local Chamber of Commerce.

== Political career ==
Hughes was elected to his first political office in 1976, winning a spot on the Hillsboro City Council, where he remained until 1980. After leaving the city council he worked as a lobbyist for the League of Oregon Cities from 1980 to 1982. In 1982, he ran for a seat in the Oregon Legislative Assembly and lost. Hughes then took a position on Hillsboro’s Planning and Zoning Hearings Board in 1985 and in May 1989 was appointed to the Hillsboro Planning Commission, where he remained until 2000. During this time he also served on the budget committee for Hillsboro High School (1986–1987) and was on a county committee that examined the county’s charter (1982–1984).

=== Mayor ===
In 2000, Hughes launched a campaign to become mayor of the city. He ran against John Godsey on a platform of slower growth, including opposing the addition of the South Hillsboro urban reserve to be within the urban growth boundary. Hughes also proposed televising the city council meetings during the campaign. During the campaign, Hughes raised about $8,800 compared to Godsey’s approximately $6,000. Major donors to Hughes' campaign included the firefighters' union, a teacher political action committee, and the Oregon League of Conservation Voters. In the November general election Hughes defeated Godsey to win a four-year term as mayor, winning 61% of the vote.

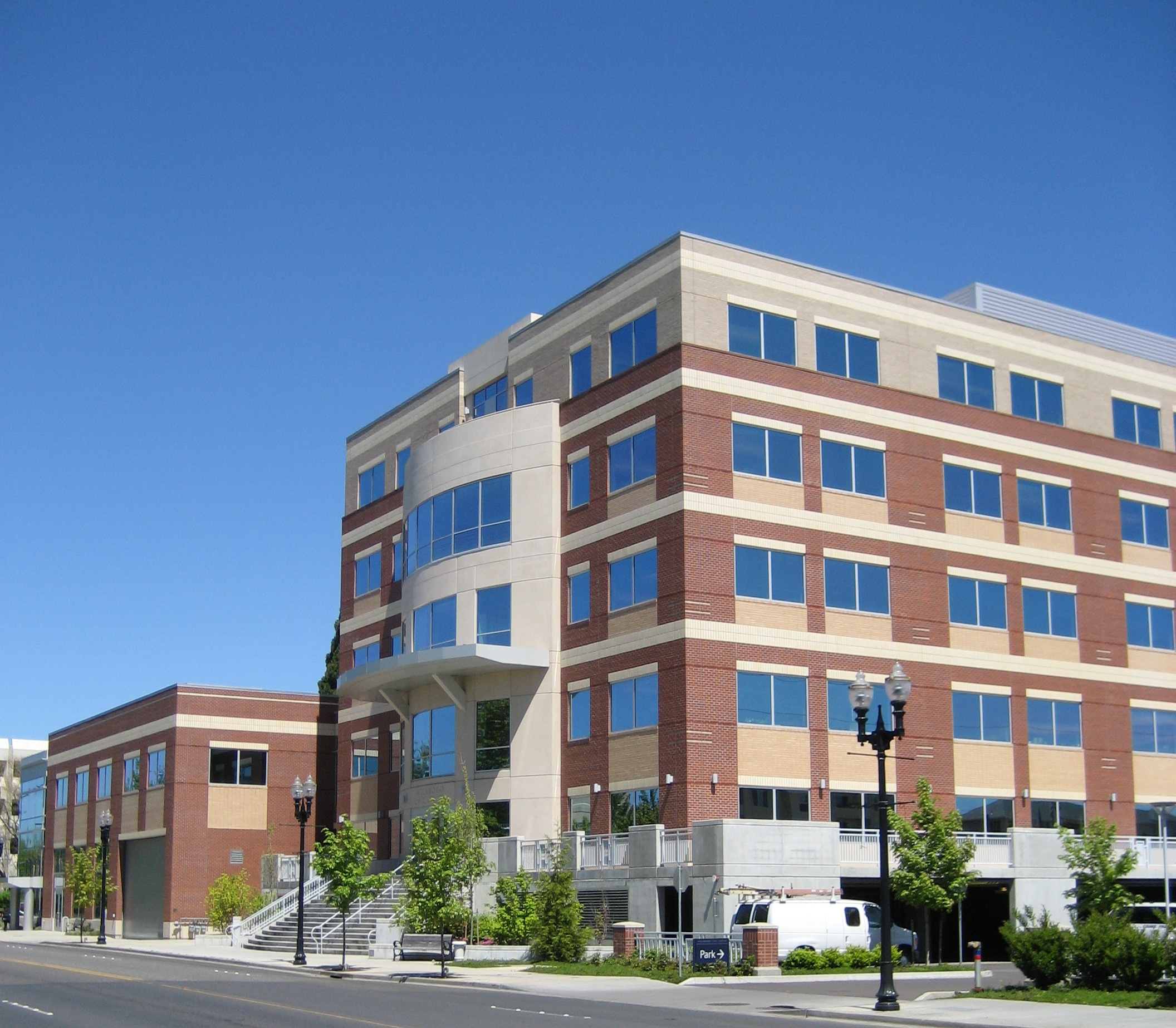
The Hillsboro Civic Center

Hughes took office on January 2, 2001, with priorities to increase the size of the Hillsboro Police Department and improve transportation. The next year, during his State of the City address, he called for more land for the city to accommodate growth and in hopes of adding a university to the area. Later that year he and other county leaders expressed dismay at Metro, the regional government, concerning the purchase of open spaces in the county using bond money approved by regional voters. Hughes complained that the county and city were not receiving as much land as they should based on the tax amounts. On May 29, 2003, he suffered a mild heart attack and had minor heart surgery at Providence St. Vincent Medical Center to undergo angioplasty and install a stent.

At the time, Providence Health System was looking to build a hospital in the city, and Hughes opposed the building of a new hospital that would compete with the only hospital in the city. Hughes would have been taken to that hospital, Tuality Community Hospital, but the emergency room was full. After three days in the hospital, Hughes was released and a week later took part in the demolition of a building. He operated a track hoe to tear down part of the building as part of a groundbreaking ceremony for the new Hillsboro Civic Center that would serve as the new city hall. During his first term as mayor, he also was the chairman of the Metro Policy Advisory Committee and worked to alleviate tensions over noise at the Hillsboro Airport.

=== Second term ===
In 2004, he ran for re-election against Bob Imbrie, grandson of the homesteader who established Imbrie Farm. Hughes won re-election to a second four-year term with 72% of the vote. During his second term he traveled to Mexico for a conference held by the Mexican government where he also hoped to find a city to partner with as sister cities. The city also worked to revise the city’s charter, but kept the two-term limit and basic role of the mayor the same. Hughes earned a Certificate of Achievement in Leadership from the National League of Cities in 2007 and served as president of the League of Oregon Cities.

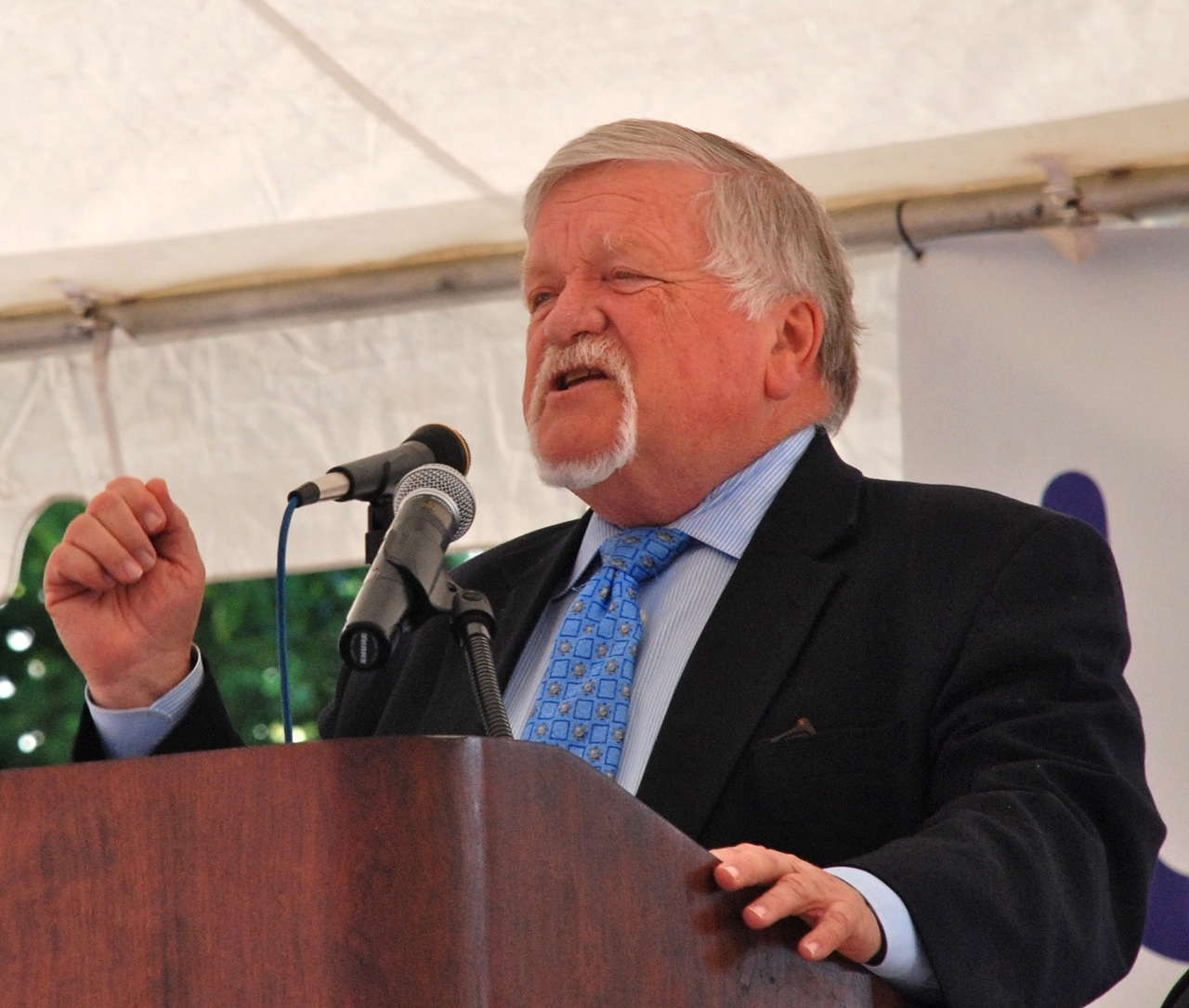
Hughes in 2012

He also was the co-chair of the Fairgrounds Revitalization Task Force that proposed changes to the Washington County Fairgrounds in Hillsboro, made city service available on the Internet, and began the broadcasting of city council meetings. In 2008, he shared an award from the League of Oregon Cities with Beaverton Mayor Rob Drake for his work in government. During his time in office the city built the Civic Center, opened the new main branch of the Hillsboro Public Library, and created the Glenn & Viola Walters Cultural Arts Center, while working to attract the Pacific University Health Professions Campus and a Genentech facility, and working to re-open the Venetian Theatre. He also fought Metro on the urban growth boundary, while residents near Turner Creek Park complained about recurring sewer overflows. On January 6, 2009, Hughes left the $3,000-per-year position and Jerry Willey was sworn in as the new mayor. In April 2009, the city renamed the plaza at city hall as the Tom Hughes Civic Center Plaza, and in May the Hillsboro Chamber of Commerce named him their distinguished citizen for 2009.

=== Metro ===
After leaving office, he took a position with Tonkon Torp LLP, in the law firm’s public affairs office as a senior policy adviser. Hughes announced in December 2009 that he would run for the office of president of the Metro Council in the 2010 election. He finished first in a three-way race in the primary, garnering 37 percent of the vote after endorsements by most of the area's newspapers and chambers of commerce. Hughes faced Bob Stacey in the November 2010 general election and won by approximately 1,000 votes out of 400,000 votes cast. Hughes was sworn into office on January 4, 2011.
