= Bag & Baggage Productions =

Bag&Baggage Productions
- Formation: 2005
- Type: Non-profit, professional theatre
- Purpose: Theatrical productions
- Location: Hillsboro, Oregon
- Staff: 5
- Volunteers: 15
- Website: www.bagnbaggage.org

Bag&Baggage Productions is a professional theatre company based in Hillsboro, in the U.S. state of Oregon. Founded in 2005, the non-profit group produces up to five fully staged plays per year and presents a variety of other acts and events. Their home venue is "The Vault", a theater located in a former bank building in downtown Hillsboro, Oregon, on East Main Street.

== History ==
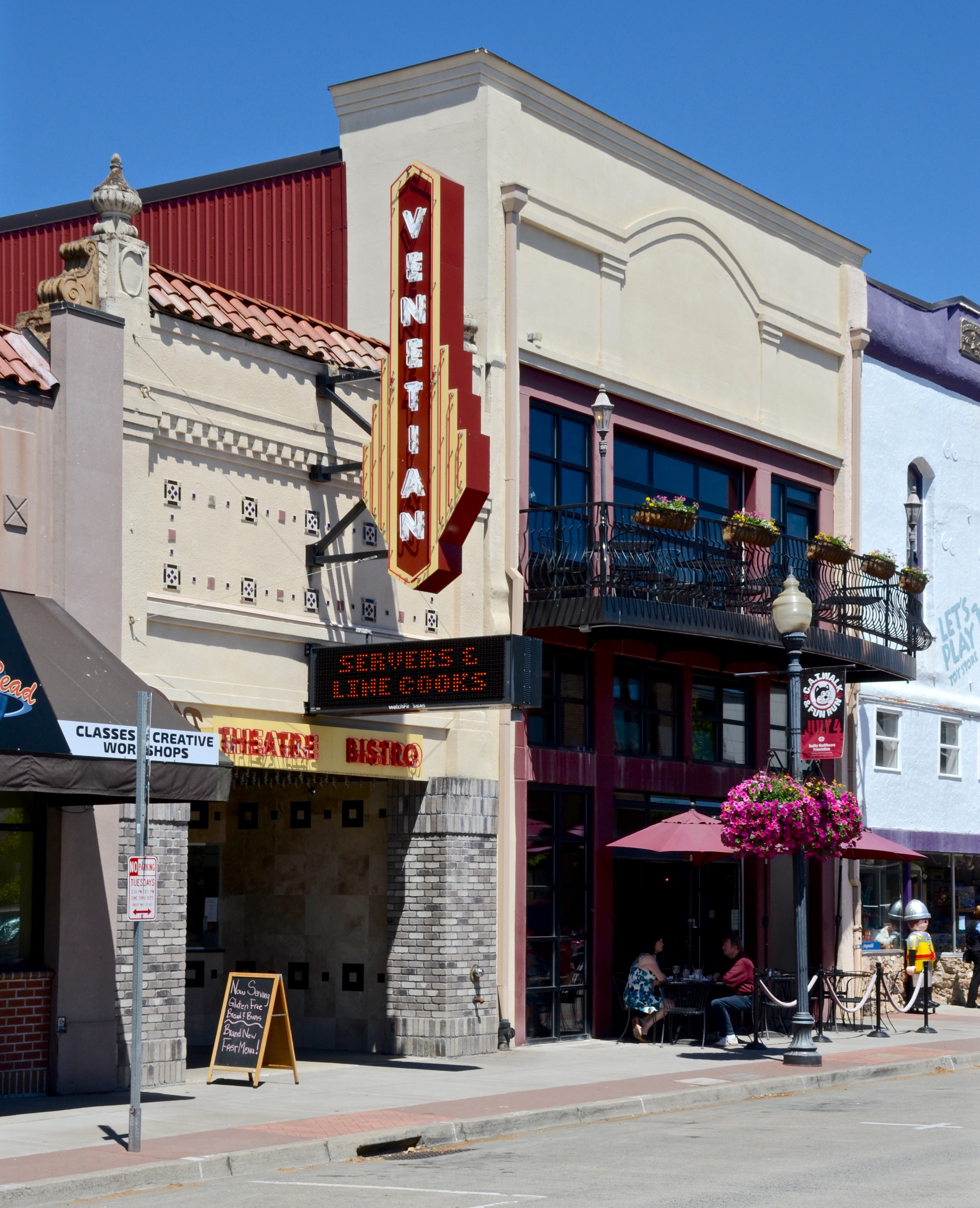
The Venetian Theatre, the organization's venue from 2008 to 2017

The company was co-founded in 2005 by several actors, including Scott Palmer, who graduated from Hillsboro High School in 1986. In the early years Bag&Baggage was a traveling theater group, making stops in communities around Oregon. Performances in Hillsboro were held at the Cornelius Pass Roadhouse and the Glenn & Viola Walters Cultural Arts Center. Other venues included the Hotel Oregon in McMinnville and the Withycombe Theatre in Corvallis, among others.

Through May 2008 the company had put on nine productions. In September 2008, Bag&Baggage became the resident theater company at the Venetian Theatre in Downtown Hillsboro. They opened their new season with Steel Magnolias. The Venetian had opened in June of that year in the space that had been a movie theater, but had sat vacant since 1996.

Season ticket sales stood at 220 for the 2007 to 2008 season, and grew to 450 for the 2008 to 2009 season. At the end of 2008 Bag&Baggage was only the second professional group for live theater in Washington County, the other being the Broadway Rose Theatre Company of Tigard. For Christmas in 2008, the theater company produced The Eight: Reindeer Monologues with four shows held at the Venetian.

In July 2009, the company put on the first outdoor Shakespeare production by professionals ever held in the city. Held at the plaza in front of the Hillsboro Civic Center, the play was Romeo and Juliet, with the production paid for in part by the city. In December 2009, they produced an adaptation of Charles Dickens' A Christmas Carol.

Bag&Baggage produced William Shakespeare's The Taming of the Shrew and John Fletcher's retort to that play, The Woman's Prize, in a combined play in February 2010. Theater critic Bob Hicks, writing about the performances for The Oregonian, said "... Bag&Baggage's doubleheader is more engaging in concept than onstage. As stimulating as the idea is, and as fun as the whole thing is in fits and starts, the carry-through can get tedious...too many balls in the air, not enough ease in the juggling...". Their version of Tennessee Williams' The Glass Menagerie later that year received a positive review by Holly Danks of The Oregonian.

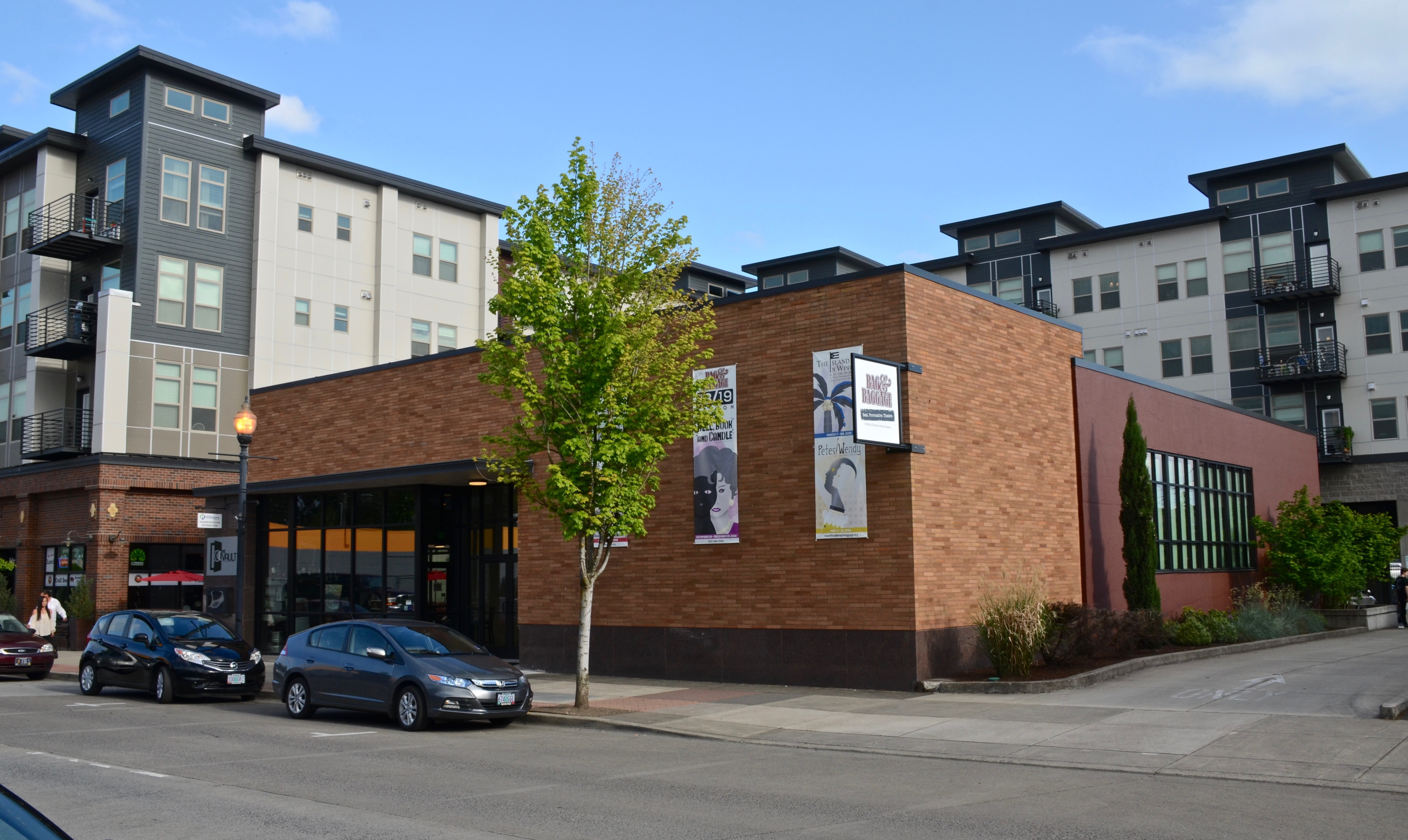
Bag & Baggage Productions' main performance venue since 2017 is this former bank building, now known as "The Vault" theater.

Bag&Baggage hosted an Oscar party in March 2010 to show the 82nd Academy Awards live at the Venetian Theatre. The company hoped to make it an annual fundraiser and become an official Oscar party sanction by the Academy of Motion Picture Arts and Sciences. Creative director Scott Palmer's adaptation of Dickens' A Christmas Carol was labeled as imaginative by Carol Wells in her review for The Oregonian in December 2011. The group was awarded $11,600 by the Regional Arts & Culture Council in July 2012, and introduced an adaptation of Shakespeare's Titus Andronicus entitled Kabuki Titus that borrowed elements from Kabuki theater. They collaborated with the Tears of Joy Theatre in December 2012 for an adaptation of The Velveteen Rabbit.

In 2015 Bag&Baggage began conversations with the city of Hillsboro about acquiring a brick and mortar space to produce out of. Under the direction of Scott Palmer and Managing Director Beth Lewis, Bag&Baggage was able to raise 1.5 million dollars to complete the renovation of a former bank building in Historic Downtown Hillsboro and cement their new creative home. The space is named "The Vault Theater & Event Space" since the bank vault from the 1950's is still in the building.

In 2018 founding artistic director Scott Palmer left the company, and associate artistic director Cassie Greer was named interim artistic director. In 2019 Cassie Greer was named Bag&Baggage's new Artistic Director by the board. Greer would serve as Artistic Director from 2019 - 2022.

Greer left the company in 2022, and Nik Whitcomb was named to the position in December 2022. Nik Whitcomb left the company in early 2025, and the theater is now led by a group of representatives from the board, the staff, and the artists: the Artistic Leadership Committee, which includes founding Artistic Director Scott Palmer.

== Productions ==
Bag&Baggage usually produces four to seven plays each season. Although their performance venue is The Vault Theater in Hillsboro, the group also performs at venues around Washington County including the fairgrounds, the Cornelius Pass Roadhouse, and the Kingstad Center (now closed), among others. Productions staged by the company have included The Importance of Being Earnest, Infinite Variety, Death of a Salesman, and others.

Bag&Baggage primarily puts on classic American and British dramas. The non-profit group is governed by a seven-member board of directors. They adopted the name of the company due to their early history as a traveling troupe. Bag and Baggage also helps educate local students about theater, including providing tickets to county high school students.

== Awards and recognition ==
In 2015, Bag&Baggage was awarded the American Theatre Wing's National Theatre Company Grant.

== See also ==
- Hillsboro Artists' Regional Theatre
