= Hillsboro Artists' Regional Theatre =

- Abbreviation: HART
- Formation: 1994
- Type: Non-profit community theatre
- Purpose: Theatrical productions
- Location(s): Hillsboro, Oregon; 45°31′17″N 122°59′17″W
- President of the Board: Aurea Taylor
- Board of directors: Marlys Carter, Paul Johnson, Kelcey Weaver, William Crawford, Cindy Wilkins, Doug Sellers
- Key people: Past President Doug Sellers
- Main organ: Board of Directors
- Website: www.hart-theatre.org

Hillsboro Artists' Regional Theatre (HART), originally the Hillsboro Actors Repertory Theater, is a community theatre group in Hillsboro, Oregon, United States. Founded in 1994, the non-profit group presents around six plays each year. Their 99-seat theater is located in downtown Hillsboro next to the Hillsboro Civic Center along Washington Street.

== History ==
The Hillsboro Actors Repertory Theater was founded in 1994 by John and Kim Sandstrom as an extension of their dinner-theater company SandStorm Productions. The married couple opened the theater in the former J. C. Penney store in downtown Hillsboro using their own money, grants, and donated time a materials. Kim Sandstrom also started the Hillsboro Actors Training studio at the same time. HART’s debut production was the comedy Light Up the Sky written by playwright Moss Hart. Directed by Nicholette Reid, the production debuted in September 1994.

By the end of their second season in 1996, the 70-seat theater had produced 11 plays. Productions in the early years included Romeo and Juliet, Barefoot in the Park, and Show Boat among others. In February 1996, the Sandstroms began looking at selling the company to a non-profit group. They sold it that year to the Friends of HART in order to focus on raising their family, though Kim remained involved as artistic director for a year. Kim Sandstrom took a hiatus from performing in 2001 after developing health problems, but returned in 2003 to start in Shirley Valentine, a one-person play by Willy Russell. Actor Bret Harrison got his first acting role at HART in a production of Our Town in these early years of HART. By 2004, Michael Hibbard had become the artistic director at HART. In June of that year, the company was required to vacate its original venue, which had 83 seats, after the rent for the space doubled. The group had also changed its name to Hillsboro Artists' Regional Theatre. Productions were then held and a variety of venues, including the Glenn & Viola Walters Cultural Arts Center.

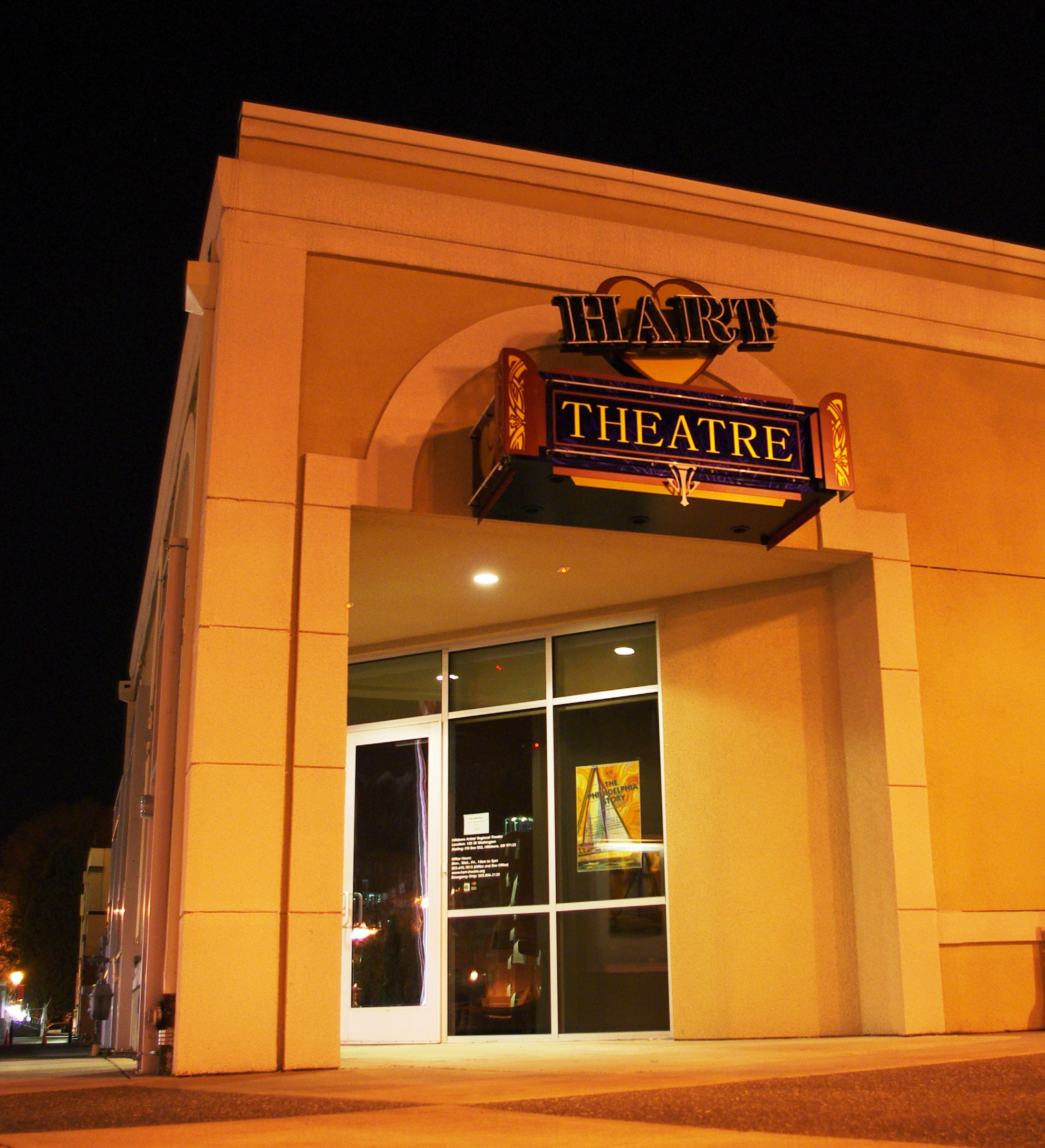
HART Theatre entrance

In February 2005, the theater company began negotiating with the city of Hillsboro to lease a building next to the new Hillsboro Civic Center. HART needed to raise more than $350,000 before late October to remodel the location along southeast Washington Street that previously housed a Pizza Schmizza restaurant and an office of Portland General Electric. Later the city gave an extension on the time HART had to raise the $600,000 needed to remodel the building. In December 2005, the theater received a $60,000 grant from the state of Oregon.

Major contributors to the fundraising campaign included Spirit Mountain Foundation, the Collins Foundation, and the Meyer Memorial Trust who had the largest donation with $100,000. By December 2006, the group had raised enough funds to sign a ten-year lease on the city-owned building at Second and Washington. The new theater opened in April 2007 with Marc Camoletti’s Don't Dress for Dinner. In September 2009, the theater added a $15,000 marquee to the building.

More recent productions have included Quilters in 2010, Woman In Black in 2011, Rumors, and Gracie for President in 2012. The theatre offers new works as well as the familiar, making an ongoing commitment to their patrons, local playwrights, directors and actors to bring a variety of entertainment and performances to the local community.

== Productions ==
Hillsboro Artists' Regional Theatre produces six to ten shows each year. The theater is a community theater, and thus actors are unpaid. Those actors involved in productions often perform other roles with the theater including making costumes, cleaning, and other behind the scenes work. Shows are held on Fridays, Saturdays, and Sundays, with Sunday shows as matinées. The theater is housed in a 3,825-square-foot (355.4 m^{2}) building owned by Hillsboro. Seating 99 people, the building includes a concession stand, a lobby, a ticket office, dressing rooms, restrooms, and an 800-square-foot (74 m^{2}) stage.

== See also ==
- Bag & Baggage Productions
