= Tears of Joy =

Tears of Joy may refer to:

== Theatre, Film and TV ==
- Tears of Joy Theatre
- Tears of Joy, Tears of Sorrow, TV movie starring John Forsythe 1986
- "Tears of Joy", TV episode Grace Under Fire, 1994
- "Tears of Joy", TV episode Mia and Me, 2012

== Music ==
=== Albums ===
- Tears of Joy (album), a 1971 album by Don Ellis, or the title song
- Tears of Joy, a 1988 album by Tuck & Patti
- Tears of Joy, a 1991 album by Jo-El Sonnier
- Tears of Joy, a 2005 album by Antonio Forcione
- Tears of Joy, a 2015 album by J. Stalin

=== Songs ===
- "Tears of Joy" (song), a song by Faith Evans
- "Tears of Joy", a 1957 song by The "5" Royales
- "Tears of Joy", a 1972 song by Eddie Floyd
- "Tears of Joy", a 1992 song by Cherrelle
- "Tears of Joy", a 1963 song by Chuck Jackson
- "Tears of Joy", a song on the soundtrack for the 2015 film Inside Out

== See also ==
- Tears
- Joy
- Face with Tears of Joy emoji
