= Glenn & Viola Walters Cultural Arts Center =

Arts center in Hillsboro, Oregon, US

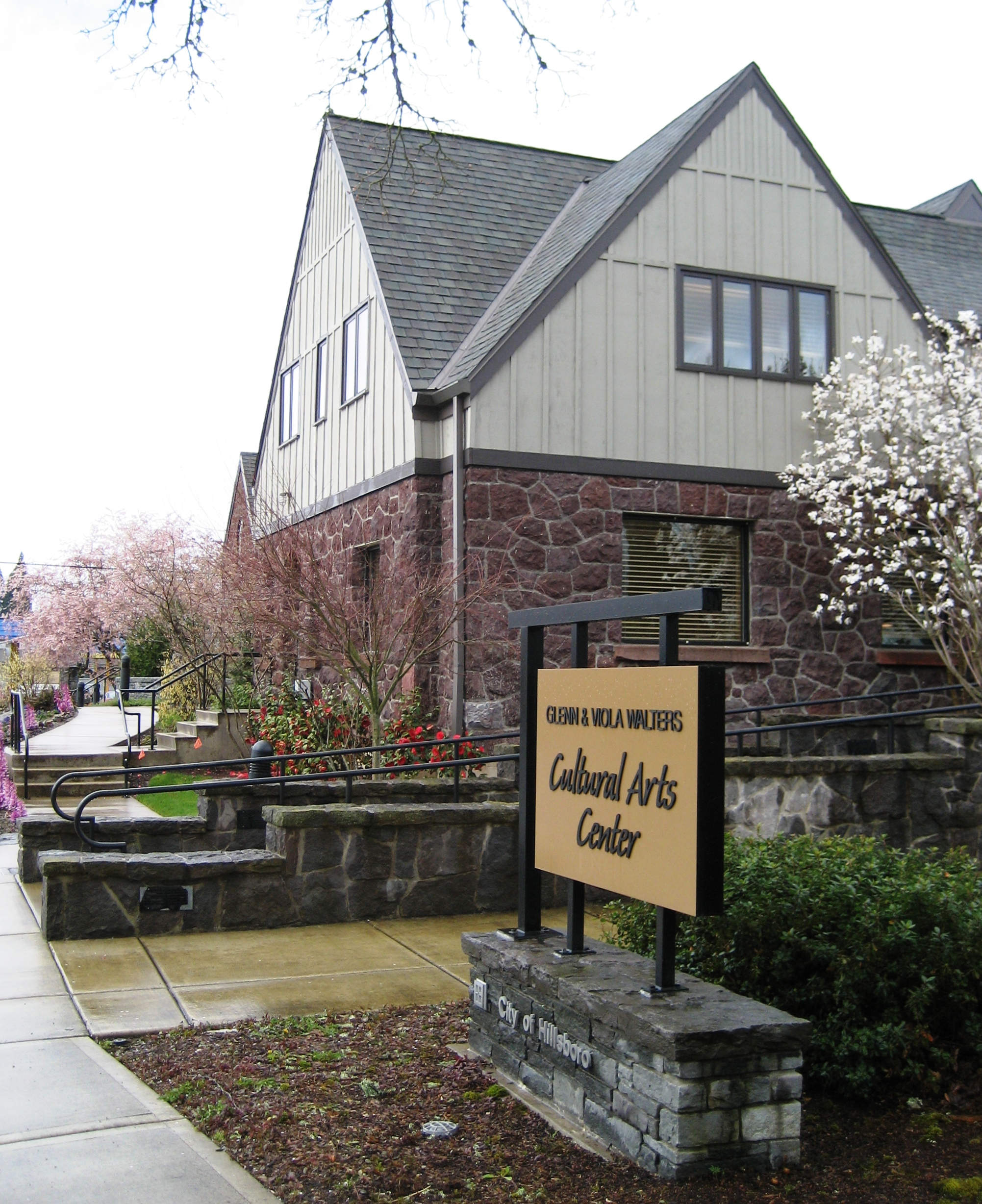
- Southeast corner
- Interactive map of the Glenn & Viola Walters Cultural Arts Center area
- Former names: Trinity Lutheran Church

General information
- Type: Arts center
- Location: Hillsboro, Oregon, United States
- Coordinates: 45°31′22″N 122°58′55″W
- Construction started: 1947
- Completed: 1949
- Owner: City of Hillsboro
- Landlord: Hillsboro Parks & Recreation Department

Technical details
- Floor count: 3
- Floor area: 15,664 square feet (1,455.2 m^{2})

The Glenn & Viola Walters Cultural Arts Center is a multi-use arts and performance venue in downtown Hillsboro, Oregon, United States. Opened in 2004, it is housed in a red-colored stone building completed in 1949 as a Lutheran church. Hillsboro, a city on the west side of Portland, owns the three-level facility and operates it through their Parks and Recreation Department.

Walters Cultural Arts Center includes gallery space, classroom space, and a 200-seat performance hall. With two above ground floors and one below ground level, the center has a total of 15,664 square feet (1,455.2 m^{2}) of space. Located on East Main Street, the Washington County Courthouse and the Hillsboro Civic Center are just to the west and the Edward Schulmerich House one block to the east on Main. The center is named in honor of a local couple who donated $1 million towards the project which included purchasing the property and US$2.4 million worth of renovations.

== History ==
The Trinity Lutheran Church congregation was founded in 1917 and acquired their first church in 1923. By the 1940s the congregation needed a larger place to worship and bought a lot on the corner of Fifth Avenue and East Main Street in downtown Hillsboro in 1941. A Camas, Washington, rock quarry offered the church an unlimited amount of red colored rock for $1,000 as a long as the church transported the rock back to Hillsboro. Construction began in 1947 and the new church was completed in 1949. By the late 1990s Trinity Lutheran had again outgrown their church and began building a new campus in the southeast part of the city.

The church did not want to sell its former home to just anyone, or for it to be torn down. At this time the city was looking for a space to use as an arts center. Plans for an arts and culture center in Hillsboro were made in the city's Hillsboro 2020 Vision. This community plan was finalized in 2000 and designed to improve the livability of the city located in the Portland metropolitan area. Hillsboro purchased the property from the church for $1.325 million in November 2000.

Most of the purchase price came from a $1 million donation by Glenn and Viola Walters to the city to help pay for an arts center in 1999. The Walterses had earned their money from operating a nursery in the surrounding community. The city had hoped to open a remodeled arts center during the winter of 2001, but this was delayed with later estimates having the center opening in late 2002. In December 2002, construction began on the work to transform the church into a culture and arts center. WaterLeaf Architecture & Interiors designed the changes to the building that sits on a 54,648 square feet (5,077.0 m^{2}) lot.

Renovations included adding a new roof, creating a new entrance, adding an elevator, among other changes. Creating a new entrance involved removing hand quarried stone from the walls to enlarge a window opening. The remodeling also brought the building up to modern seismic codes and to comply with the Americans with Disabilities Act (ADA). City officials hoped to maintain the character of the original structure despite changes and upgrades. The total cost for renovations as of opening were $2.4 million, with the city paying for 60% of those costs. Some financing for the center came from selling bricks to the public that were then used on exterior spaces.

On March 16, 2004, the Glenn & Viola Walters Cultural Arts Center opened. Total cost for the project including buying the property was around $3.5 million. The center's operating budget comes from city funds and user generated fees. A new classical music concert series was started at the center in 2009, as was a book club focusing on arts and culture titles. In April 2010, the Oregon Mandolin Orchestra held their first ever concert at the center.

== Building ==
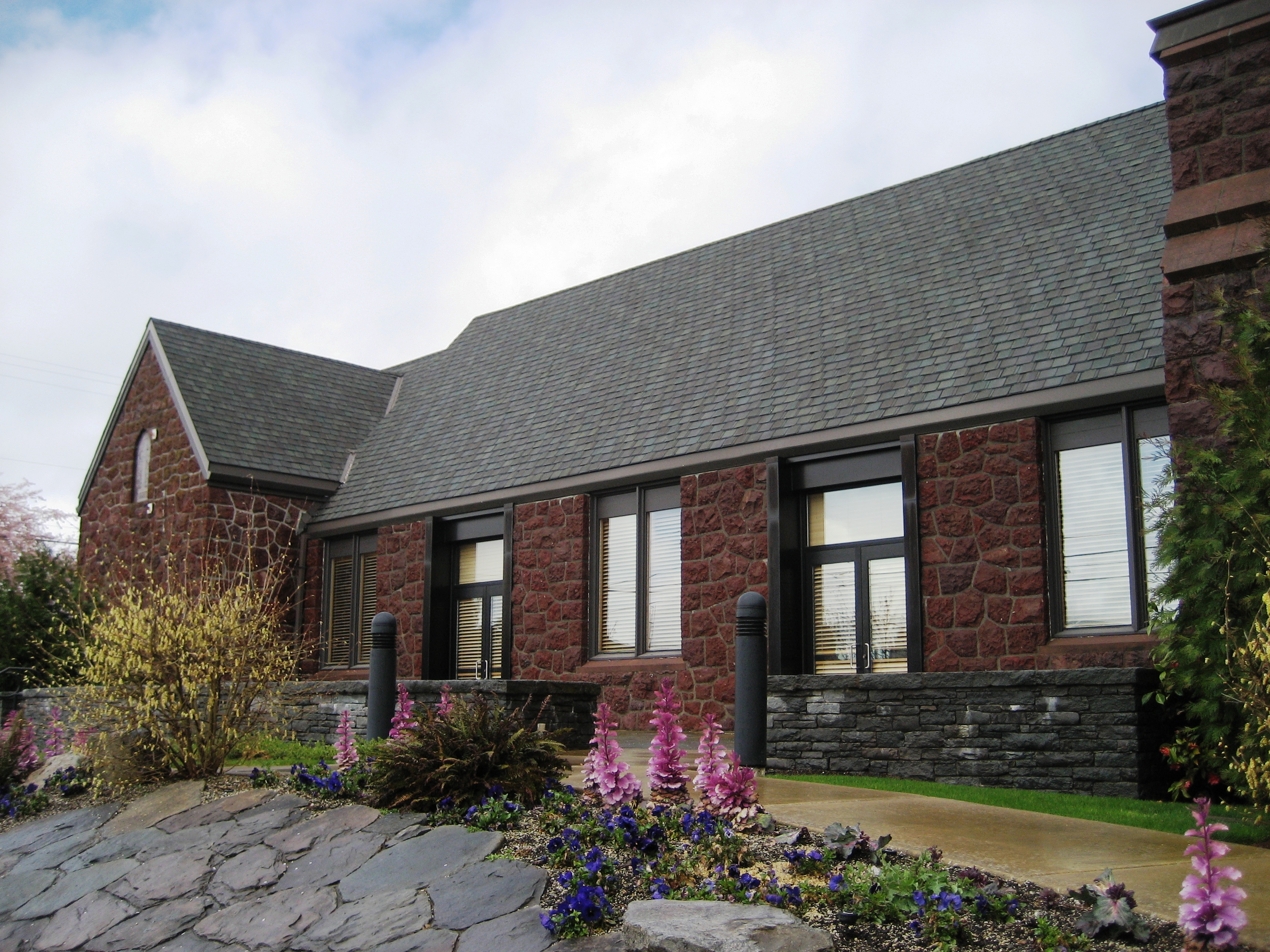
South side facing Main Street

Located on Main Street at Fifth Avenue in downtown Hillsboro, the center is two blocks from the Hillsboro Central/3rd Avenue Transit Center MAX light rail station. The building covers 15,664 square feet (1,455.2 m^{2}) of space and contains five classrooms, a lobby, meeting rooms, a box office, exhibition gallery, and an auditorium. The main part of the building has rock walls, and the auditorium contains high, arched ceilings and stained-glass windows. Once featuring a stone chimney, contractors removed the chimney during conversion to the center and inserted an elevator to comply with ADA requirements.

The T-shaped center has three levels, which includes a basement that houses classrooms used for art instruction. Instruction includes courses on creating pottery, sculptures, and ceramics. The second story contains exhibition gallery space and multipurpose rooms, with the focus on visual arts. On the main level is the 2,000-square-foot (190 m^{2}) auditorium where the church's sanctuary was located. The auditorium seats up to 200 people and is used for concerts, lectures, plays, and other events.

On the outside is a garden, and a lawn area to the east with a small stage that is used for fair weather events such as summer concerts. Also outside the building is a new wheelchair ramp that was added to the east side where a new entrance was added. There are two terraces on the exterior of the building and the inside also has a kitchen area.

== Operations ==
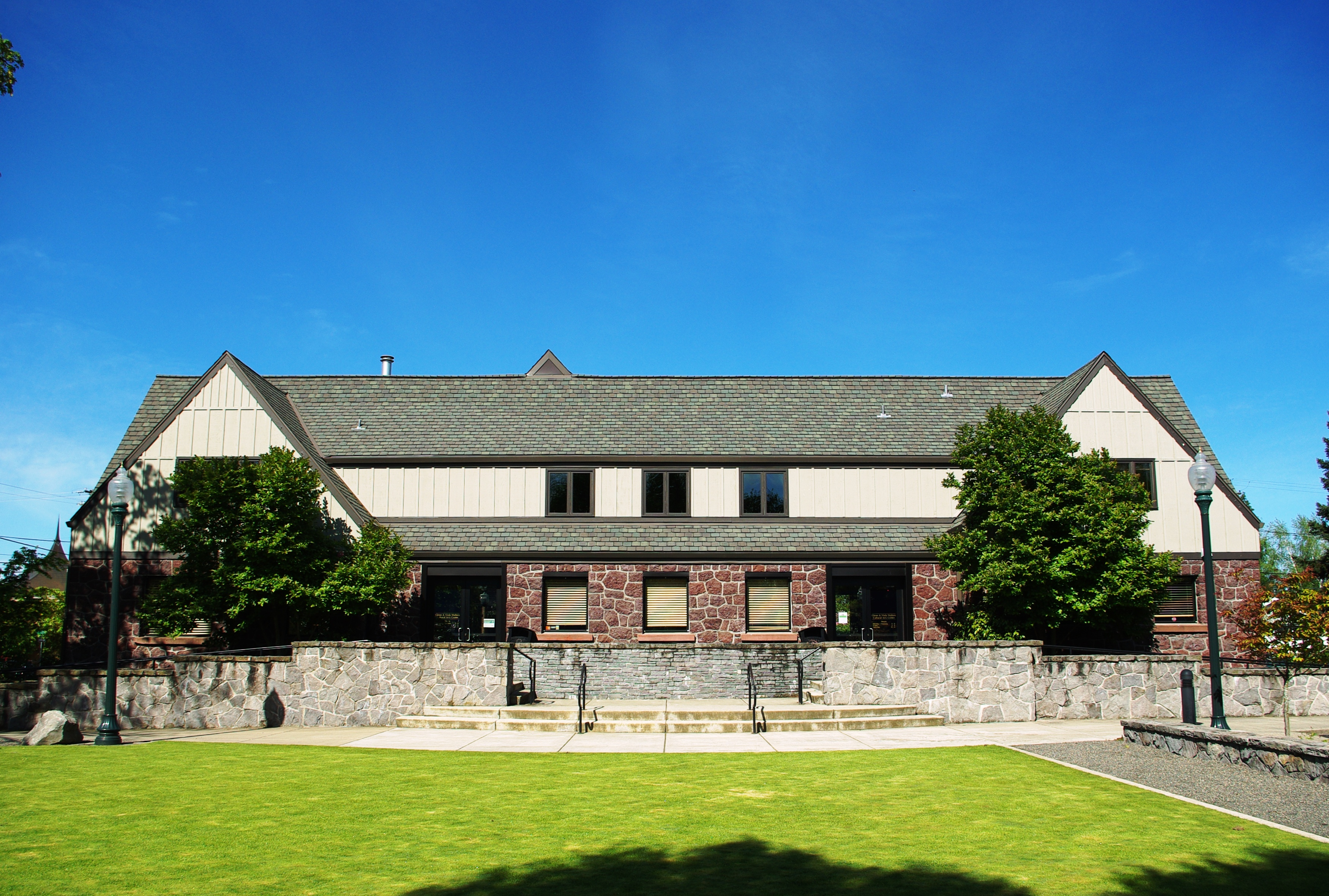
East face of the building

Walters Cultural Arts Center was designed to be a bookend, along with the Hillsboro Civic Center, to increased downtown development. The center is the city's first dedicated arts facility. City officials hoped to create a magnet for artists and aficionados in the downtown area with the center and other developments that include a renovated Venetian Theatre. The goal was to have the center encourage art studios to open and for art related festivals to develop to attract people to downtown after most businesses closed. Traditionally, shops and businesses closed by 6:00 p.m. as workers in the county seat left for the day. The center also is rented out to groups for private functions.

Performances at the Walters Cultural Arts Center include opera, folk music, country music, and spoken word acts. These include poetry readings and lectures. Art exhibits have included "Organic," "Questioning Functionality," and "Questioning Functionality 2 (QF2)" among others. These shows have included art forms such as interior design, crafts, sculpture, and fine art.
