= John Hughes (counselor) =

John D. Hughes
- Born: March 2, 1945; LaGrande, Oregon
- Died: January 31, 2012 (aged 66); Sunnyside, Washington
- Occupation: Substance Abuse/School Counselor

John Dennis Hughes (March 3, 1945 – January 31, 2012) was a pioneer in the field of school-based alcohol and drug prevention efforts in the Pacific Northwest. He served in various capacities during his career including positions at the Washington State Office of Superintendent of Public Instruction and the Drug Enforcement Administration.

== Personal life ==
Hughes was born in La Grande, Union County, Oregon, in 1945 to Frederick Manson "Tom" Hughes, and Dorothy Velma Hughes (née Wilmers). He was the younger brother of Metro Council President and former Hillsboro Mayor Tom Hughes and the ex-husband of Portland art patron Anne Hughes. He moved to Hillsboro with his family in 1952, where he graduated from Hillsboro High School in 1963. As an adult, he lived in Portland, Hillsboro, Vancouver, Washington, Kingston, Washington, and Sunnyside, Washington, where he retired in 2010, with Regina, his wife of three decades. He was deeply involved in Alcoholics Anonymous and was himself a recovering alcoholic.

== Professional career ==
After high school, he worked as a VISTA volunteer, working with Mexican migrant farm workers in the Willamette Valley. While there, he pressed for the migrants themselves to assume a greater leadership role than had been the case prior. He received his Master of Social Work from Portland State University (without ever earning a bachelor's degree).

In the years before his work in the public schools, he worked in private practice as a family therapist, and worked as a support group facilitator in a variety of settings, including work with inmates of the Oregon Department of Corrections. Hughes did extensive work helping those who suffered from substance abuse.

=== Work in public education ===
In 1981, Hughes took a position with the Evergreen School District as an on-campus intervention expert. His duties included identifying students with substance abuse problems and getting them help, including referrals to alcohol and drug treatment facilities. Hughes moved to Bremerton, where he served as the Director of Drug Education Department, supervising a staff of school interventionists. He instituted reporting mechanisms to monitor their performance. The data from these reports, became part of subsequent government publications and scholarly papers to which Hughes contributed.

Hughes worked for the Washington State Office of Superintendent of Public Instruction in the 1990s and 2000s. There, he served as Director of the Safe and Drug Free Schools Program and as Program Supervisor of Intervention and Prevention Services.

During this time, he also worked in the Washington DC office of the US Justice Department's Drug Enforcement Administration as a Senior Prevention Programs Manager for the department's Demand Reduction Section. While there, as a member of the National Network of Safe and Drug-Free Schools and Communities, he worked to build bridges between the agency and community-based intervention and prevention programs. He oversaw the creation of a formal system of training for technical and community college students aspiring to become substance abuse counselors.

In the early 2000s, Hughes moved to Sunnyside, Washington and took the position of Safe Schools Director. In addition to anti-drug and alcohol efforts he was also responsible for efforts to counter the influence of youth gangs in the Sunnyside area. He aided in the establishment of school-based health programs.

After retirement, he continued to work and remained in Sunnyside until his death.
