= Orange Phelps =

American politician

Mayor of Hillsboro, Oregon
- In office January 2, 1929 – January 2, 1935
- Preceded by: Mason P. Cady
- Succeeded by: John H. Garrett

Personal details
- Born: December 24, 1886 Davis, California
- Died: August 4, 1985 (aged 98) Forest Grove, Oregon
- Spouse: Ora Etta Whitmore
- Children: 2
- Education: Hanover College; Northwestern University
- Profession: Businessman

Orange Phelps (December 24, 1886 – August 4, 1985) was an American businessman and politician in the state of Oregon. A native of California, he attended colleges in the Midwest where he played baseball before moving to Oregon. Phelps settled near Portland in Hillsboro where he opened the first movie theater and later served as a mayor of that city and on the city council. He continued in the movie business until the 1970s and also opened the first drive-in theater in the county.

== Early life ==
Phelps was born to Frederick and Alice C. Phelps on December 24, 1886, in Davis, California. Frederick had moved to the West Coast in 1866, where Orange's mother was born, and the couple had four daughters and four sons. Orange grew up in Davis before attending college at Hanover College in Hanover, Indiana.

He then transferred to Northwestern University in the Chicago area where he played baseball. Following college he moved to Southern Oregon where he worked at the Granite Hill Mine near Grants Pass, and in 1906 Phelps moved north to Hillsboro, Oregon. In Hillsboro he first worked for the agency that became the Oregon Department of Fish and Wildlife. In 1908 he entered the movie theater business. Phelps also played catcher for the semi-professional Hillsboro Cardinals for about twelve years, starting in 1909. On August 28, 1910, he married Ora Etta Whitmore, who died in 1974. They had two sons, John Vincent and Orange W. Phelps.

== Career ==
In Hillsboro he opened the Arcade Theater, a 108-seat movie house on East Main Street in Downtown Hillsboro in 1908. At that time he also worked as the booking agent for the Crescent Theater. The Arcade was Hillsboro's first movie house. About 1910 he started showing movies in Shute Park in a large black tent each year on the Fourth of July. This venture proved profitable, so he traveled with his tent to the coastal community of Rockaway each summer. As the community did not yet have electricity, Phelps had to bring his own generators, and as such, he was known as the person to bring the first lights to Rockaway.

In 1913, the Shute Bank of Hillsboro moved to a new location, and bank president John W. Shute offered to sell the building to Phelps for use as a movie theater. Shute offered to loan Phelps the money to buy the building. Phelps renovated the building that had been built in 1888 and opened the 200-seat Grand Theater that same year. He expanded the theater to 500 seats in 1916 and changed the moniker to the Liberty Theater.

From 1916 to 1917 he also operated the Majestic Theater in Downtown Hillsboro. Ten years after opening his Grand Theater in 1926, Phelps remodeled it and changed the name to the Venetian Theatre, which in turn burned in 1956. In 1957, he re-opened the renovated movie theater as the Town Theater. The new theater had 750 seats. Earlier he had teamed up with Harry Hill to build the Hill Theater on Northeast Third Avenue, with that Art Deco-style theater opening in 1937. Phelps also started holding a free Christmas show for children at the Venetian in 1935, which became an annual Hillsboro tradition into the 1980s. In 1951, he opened Washington County's first drive-in movie theater, the CarVue in neighboring Cornelius in partnership with one son, Vincent, and the owners of Forest Grove's theaters. The Car Vue was torn down in the early 1980s to prepare for construction of a Fred Meyer store.

=== Civic affairs ===
Phelps entered politics in 1920 when he ran for a seat on the Hillsboro City Council, winning the November election and taking office on January 4, 1921. He won re-election to the council and remained in that office until January 4, 1927. While in office, he was in-charge Hillsboro's annual Fourth of July celebration in 1923, and in 1921 he had helped get the Pavilion at Shute Park built.

Phelps ran for mayor of the city in 1928 and faced E. L. McCormick in the November election. Phelps won the contest, running on a platform of efficient business, and succeeded M. P. Cady. He won re-election as mayor in an uncontested race in November 1932, and served as mayor from January 2, 1929, until January 2, 1935, when J. H. Garrett became mayor.

From 1928 to 1929 he served as president of the Hillsboro Rotary Club, and was a founder of the Hillsboro Happy Days festival that celebrated Independence Day. Phelps was involved with the local Boy Scouts, serving as a chairman of a local committee in 1935, as did future governor Paul L. Patterson. He also served on the city's planning commission from 1935 until 1969. During World War II Phelps served as a civilian defense director.

== Later years ==
Phelps was named as the distinguished citizen of the year in the senior division by the Hillsboro Chamber of Commerce in 1964. He was a member of the Independent Order of Odd Fellows, a Freemason with the Tuality Lodge, and a member of the Montezuma Lodge.

In 1978, Phelps sold his theaters to Tom Moyer's theater chain. He had been named as the oldest movie theater man still living in the country before he retired. Orange Phelps died on August 4, 1985, in Forest Grove, Oregon, at the age of 98. He was buried at Mount Olive Cemetery in the community of Laurel, south of Hillsboro.
