= Shirley Huffman =

American mayor

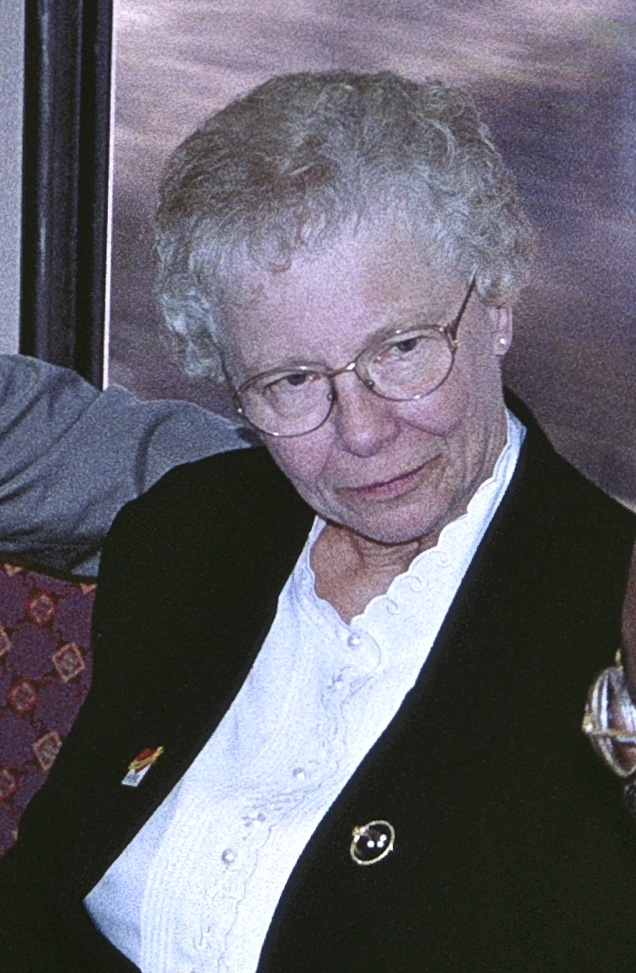
- Huffman in 1998

Mayor of Hillsboro, Oregon
- In office 1985–1993
- Preceded by: Jim Darr
- Succeeded by: Gordon Faber

Member of the Hillsboro City Council
- In office 1977–1985

Personal details
- Born: Shirley Todd; August 30, 1928 Bowdle, South Dakota, U.S.
- Died: July 1, 2018 (aged 89) Ventura, California, U.S.
- Spouse: Thomas Huffman (d. 1999)
- Children: 2

Shirley Todd Huffman (August 30, 1928 – July 1, 2018) was an American politician and legal secretary in the U.S. state of Oregon. Raised in Dayton, Oregon, she settled in Hillsboro, Oregon, where she served on the city council before serving two terms as mayor from 1985 to 1993. During her time as mayor, plans for the Westside Light Rail were approved, with Huffman receiving credit for the extension into downtown Hillsboro. After leaving office, she served on the board of directors of TriMet and as a development coordinator for the city.

== Early life ==
Shirley Todd was born on August 30, 1928, in Bowdle, South Dakota. Shirley met Thomas A. Huffman when growing up in Dayton, Oregon, when both were seven years old. They married in 1949 and had two children, son Tom Jr. and daughter Julie. The Huffmans moved to Hillsboro in 1954 after Thomas graduated from Willamette University College of Law in Salem. Tom had been a student of later U.S. Senator Mark Hatfield, who taught at Willamette’s undergraduate school. In Hillsboro, Shirley joined the Trinity Lutheran Church in downtown, and worked as a legal secretary for her husband until 1989.

== Political career ==
Huffman’s political career began in June 1977, when she was appointed to the Hillsboro City Council to replace resigned member Ted Clarno. She had been asked to join the council, and agreed to what she originally planned to be a short-term involvement in city government. She was subsequently elected to the position in 1978, for a term starting in January 1979, and served on the council until 1985. In 1984, she ran for mayor, winning the November election after running unopposed and becoming Hillsboro’s first woman mayor.

During her first term that was to be two years long, she worked to have the city charter revised to extend terms of the mayor to four years. The city council and city voters approved the change, with mayors now holding office for four years, though still limited to two consecutive terms. In 1988, she was again unopposed and won re-election, this time to a four-year term. As mayor, a part-time and unpaid position, she worked in the position between 35 and 40 hours each week. This work included representing the city at official events as well as lobbying on behalf of the city.

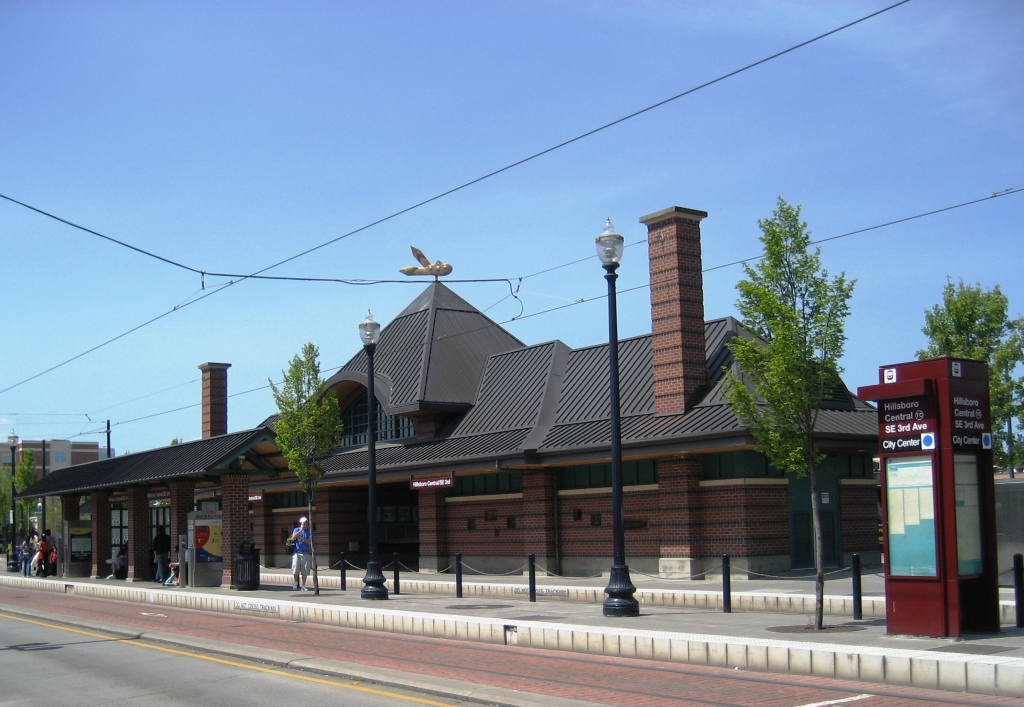
Hillsboro Central MAX Station

Huffman is credited with getting MAX light rail extended to downtown Hillsboro from its originally planned terminus at 185th Avenue. Her lobbying included an episode when she spoke roughly to the head of the Federal Transit Administration in a phone call ("I had to get a little stern with him," said Huffman), as well as trips to Washington DC. TriMet’s general manager Fred Hansen stated, "We wouldn't be standing here [Hillsboro Central Station] if it hadn't been for Shirley; we'd be back at 185th looking to the west." For Huffman's role, TriMet added a plaque in 2000 at the Hillsboro Central Station honoring her work on the project. The plaque, dedicated on February 22, 2000, reads: "Shirley's vision and leadership brought MAX to Hillsboro, linking the region and its people together."

As mayor she was an opponent of the regional government Metro, with actions that included introducing a city resolution calling for Metro to be kept to its existing powers and duties. The resolution was later passed by the city council. She had helped develop a similar resolution for a group representing the county and ten other cities, with both resolutions sent to a task force created by the Oregon Legislature that was examining the role of Metro. She and county leaders later battled Metro on proposed garbage transfer stations as well.

Huffman traveled to Fukuroi, Japan, in 1988 to sign an agreement that created a sister-city relationship with the Japanese city. Fukuroi officials had visited Hillsboro in June 1987. During her time as mayor, many Japanese-based companies opened facilities in Hillsboro. Also as mayor she proposed a city ordinance to ban ferrets as pets after an infant died after being bitten more than 200 times in its crib in 1991, but later dropped the proposal after public support emerged for allowing ferrets.

While mayor she served on the board of directors for the League of Oregon Cities, including one year as president of that organization in 1987. Also during her time as mayor, Operation Picture Perfect started to assist in beautifying the city. Huffman was mayor from 1985 to 1993. She was praised for her work on behalf of the city by other elected officials in Hillsboro. "I think her power lies in her ability to get people to agree without conflict; she defuses any situation and is able to make things happen," said councilman Jim Lushina, while incoming mayor Gordon Faber said, "Shirley has done incredible things for our city. What a great mayor that woman has been." While she was mayor Hillsboro grew from around 29,000 residents to approximately 40,000.

== Later years ==
I care about people, and I think it shows. What I've done, I've done with sincerity.

— Shirley Huffman

After leaving office, the Hillsboro Chamber of Commerce named her as its distinguished citizen for 1993. Huffman then took a position with the organization as economic development coordinator later that year, with the city paying half the salary. She also became the chairperson for the Washington County Community Action Organization’s capital campaign in 1993 to raise $1.3 million for a new building.

In 1992, she joined the TriMet board of directors and spent eight years on the board, leaving in January 2000. Huffman was honored in 1993 when the auditorium at the county and city’s jointly owned Public Services Building was named in her honor. In 1994, the League of Oregon Cities gave her their Jim Richards Memorial Award. Huffman later led the campaign to approve a levy to build two new libraries and convert the Shute Park branch into a recreation center in 2002. The measure was defeated by voters in May 2002. She also worked to develop the Hillsboro 2020 Vision plan adopted by the city.

At the end of 2014, Huffman was living in an assisted living facility in Hillsboro, but subsequently moved to California. Huffman died on July 1, 2018, in Ventura, California, at the age of 89.
