= Jerry Willey =

American politician

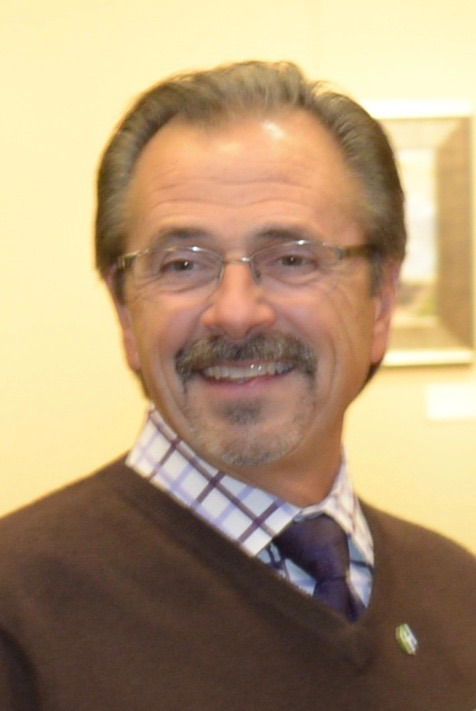
- Willey in February 2013

Washington County Commissioner
- Incumbent
- Assumed office January 9, 2019
- Preceded by: Bob Terry
- Constituency: District 4

Mayor of Hillsboro, Oregon
- In office January 6, 2009 – January 3, 2017
- Preceded by: Tom Hughes
- Succeeded by: Steve Callaway

Member of the Hillsboro City Council
- In office 1992–1997

Personal details
- Born: September 25, 1947 (age 79) Walla Walla, Washington
- Party: Republican
- Spouse: Judy Willey
- Children: 2
- Education: Washington State University
- Profession: Politician
- Website: Archived

Jerry Willey (born September 25, 1947) is an American politician who is currently a Washington County Commissioner and was the 41st mayor of Hillsboro, Oregon, a position he held from 2009 to 2017.

== Biography ==
Willey was born in Walla Walla, Washington.

Willey served in the United States Navy during the Vietnam War and moved to Hillsboro in 1983, serving on the Hillsboro City Council from 1992 until 1997. Willey graduated from Washington State University with a Bachelor of Arts in business and accounting. He is married to former Oregon International Air Show president Judy Willey and has two children, Rob and Kasi. Willey, elected in 2008, took office on January 6, 2009, succeeding Tom Hughes. His term expired on January 3, 2017, and Steve Callaway became the new mayor.

In May 2017 the city of Hillsboro announced that they were renaming the Orenco Station Plaza for Willey. The Plaza was dedicated on June 11, 2017, and is now called the "Jerry Willey Plaza at Orenco Station".

Willey successfully ran for a seat on the Washington County Board of Commissioners in 2018.
