= Gordon Faber =

American mayor (1931–2014)

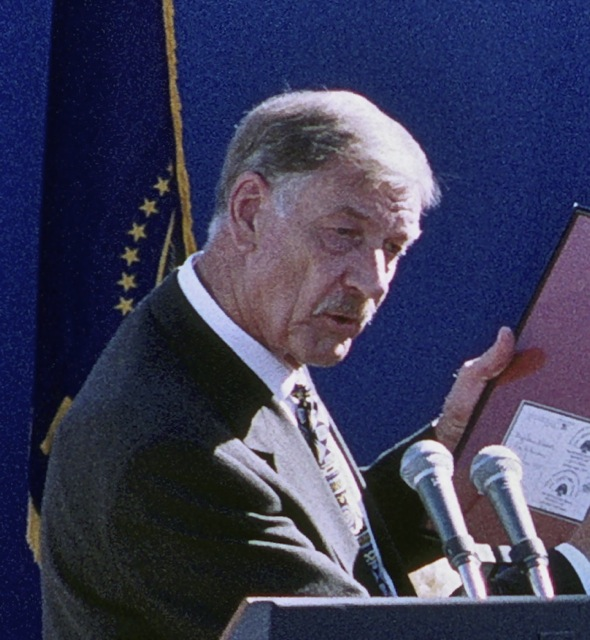
- Faber in 1998

Mayor of Hillsboro, Oregon
- In office 1993–2001
- Preceded by: Shirley Huffman
- Succeeded by: Tom Hughes

Member of the Hillsboro City Council
- In office 1981–1985; 1987–1993

Personal details
- Born: April 2, 1931 Greensburg, Pennsylvania
- Died: August 18, 2014 (aged 83) Hillsboro, Oregon
- Spouse(s): Barbara Loftin (1951–?); Barbara (B. J.) Jeddeloh (1990–2014)
- Children: 3
- Education: Willamette University; Lewis & Clark College
- Occupation: Retired

Gordon C. Faber (April 2, 1931 – August 18, 2014) was an American politician and businessman in the U.S. state of Oregon. A native of Pennsylvania, he grew up in Hillsboro, Oregon. He joined the U.S. Air Force during the Korean War and was a small business owner before becoming a real estate agent and entering politics. He served on Hillsboro's budget committee and city council before serving two terms as mayor from 1993 to 2001. The Gordon Faber Recreation Complex in the city's northeast corner is named in his honor.

== Early life ==
Gordon Faber was born on April 2, 1931, in Greensburg, Pennsylvania to Ben Faber. The family moved to Hillsboro, Oregon, in 1934 where he grew up. As a boy he was a member of the Boy Scouts, but since Hillsboro did not have a city pool he was unable to earn his swimming merit badge. He attended the local schools and graduated from Hillsboro High School in 1949 before enrolling at Lewis & Clark College in neighboring Portland. Faber attended the school for a year and a half and then joined the United States Air Force when the Korean War began. In the Air Force he was assigned to the Armed Forces Special Weapons project and spent nearly four years with the unit. He married Barbara Loftin in 1951, and in time the couple had three children (Mark, Rod, and Bob).

Following his military service he returned to Oregon and college. Faber entered Willamette University in Salem, where he graduated with a degree in economics in 1956. He then returned to Hillsboro and worked for his father in the family's plumbing and electrical business that included a retail appliance store. Later he bought out his brother and then father from the business, but sold it in 1985. Faber then worked as a car salesman before entering the real estate field as a sales agent for Barbara Sue Seal Properties. He was also a member of Hillsboro's Rotary International club, including serving as president from 1984 to 1985.

== Political career ==
Faber's political career began when he served on Hillsboro's budget committee. In 1981, he joined the city council where he served a four-year term ending in 1985 alongside later mayor Shirley Huffman. After a two-year absence he returned for a second four-year term in 1987, followed by another term that would have run until 1995. In July 1992, Faber announced he would run for mayor of Hillsboro to replace Huffman, who could not run again due to term limits.

During the campaign season he openly opposed the Oregon Citizens Alliance’s ballot measure that was seen as anti-gay rights. He ran unopposed and won the election that November, while the ballot measure was defeated. Faber took office in 1993, and left the city council at that time after spending ten years on the council.

=== Mayor ===
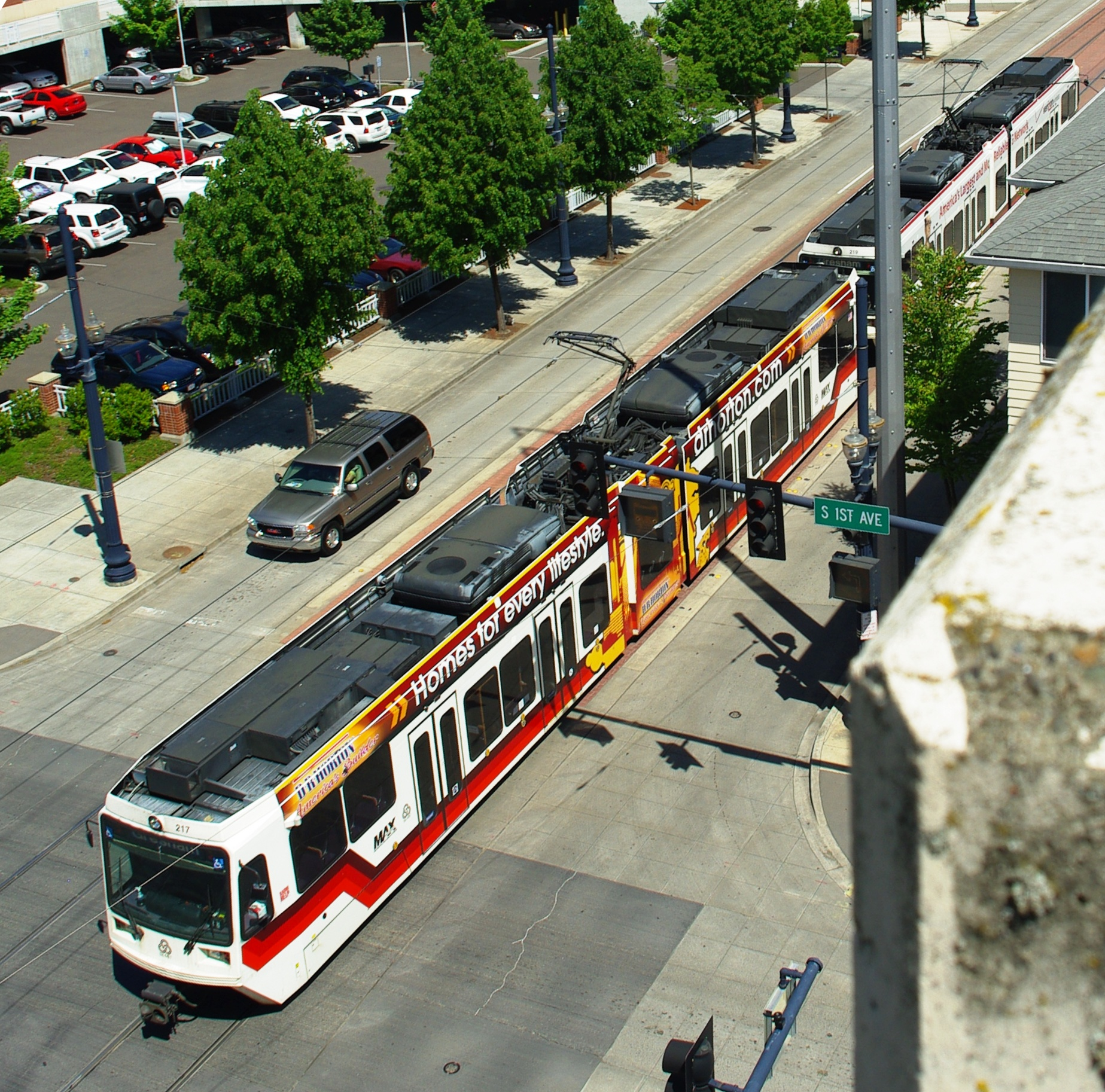
MAX Light Rail in downtown Hillsboro

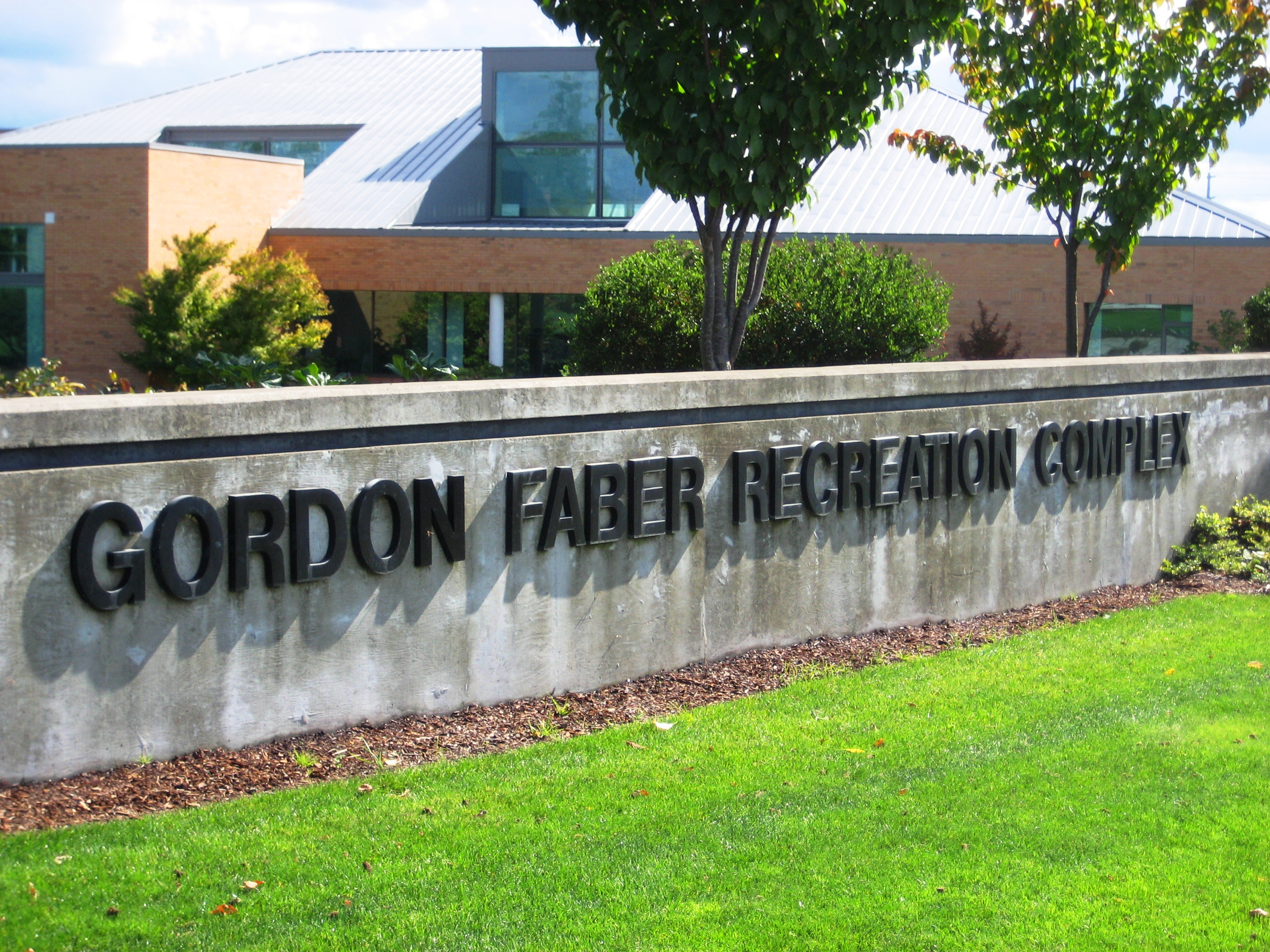
The Gordon Faber Recreation Complex

As mayor in April 1995, he cast the tie-breaking vote that allowed for the construction of an apartment complex in the Jackson School neighborhood that was opposed by the neighborhood, but allowed by the existing zoning of the property. Hillsboro mayors do not hold a vote on the city council, but do break ties. Later state legislators Jim Hill and Bruce Starr also voted in favor of allowing the complex, while later mayor Jerry Willey voted against the complex. After the vote Faber announced he would not seek a second term as mayor, but changed his mind and announced he would run for a second term in July 1996. He presided over the ribbon cutting at the apartment complex when it opened in August 1996, and later called the vote the toughest decision he had to make as mayor.

In the November 1996 election he defeated retired sheet metal worker Gordon B. Sherman, winning 84% of the vote. He advocated for the expansion of the urban growth boundary, including bringing in the South Hillsboro Reserve area. "I view the city as a living, breathing thing. And if it doesn't grow, it dies. I think growth was necessary to keep the town alive and healthy."

Faber worked to defeat a proposal to site a new women's prison in Hillsboro in 1997. Oregon governor John Kitzhaber insisted a prison be built in the Portland metropolitan area in either Hillsboro or at the site of the former Dammasch State Hospital in Wilsonville. The Wilsonville location was selected in May 1997, though the prison (Coffee Creek Correctional Facility) was later built north of the former state hospital. Faber joined Kitzhaber in 2000 on a visit to Japan, where Faber visited Hillsboro's sister city of Fukuroi as well as the headquarters of many of the Japanese-based companies with facilities in Hillsboro.

On January 2, 2001, he left office and was succeeded by Tom Hughes. While Faber was mayor, the city grew from approximately 40,000 residents to 72,630 and became the fifth most populous in the state. During his tenure the MAX Light Rail’s Blue Line opened to Hillsboro, the city created the Ronler Acres urban renewal district that led to a new campus in the city from Intel as well as the construction of Hillsboro Stadium, and the Hillsboro 2020 Vision plan was created. The Gordon Faber Recreation Complex includes the stadium and the Hillsboro Ballpark, and is named in his honor.

== Later life and family ==
After leaving office he planned to learn to play a musical instrument, learn to use a computer, and take some college level history classes. Faber suffered a heart attack a few years after leaving office, but survived. His marriage to his first wife, Barbara, having ended, Faber remarried in 1990 to B. J. Jeddeloh (also Barbara). Faber was known for his sense of humor, which included an episode where he carried an axe while wearing an executioner's hood to the performance review of the city's manager. A scholarship is given in his name by the Hillsboro Community Foundation for local students pursuing nursing careers. In 2014, he began receiving hospice care at home due to chronic obstructive pulmonary disease. Gordon Faber died on August 18, 2014, at home at the age of 83 due to chronic obstructive pulmonary disease.
