= Washington County Courthouse (Oregon) =

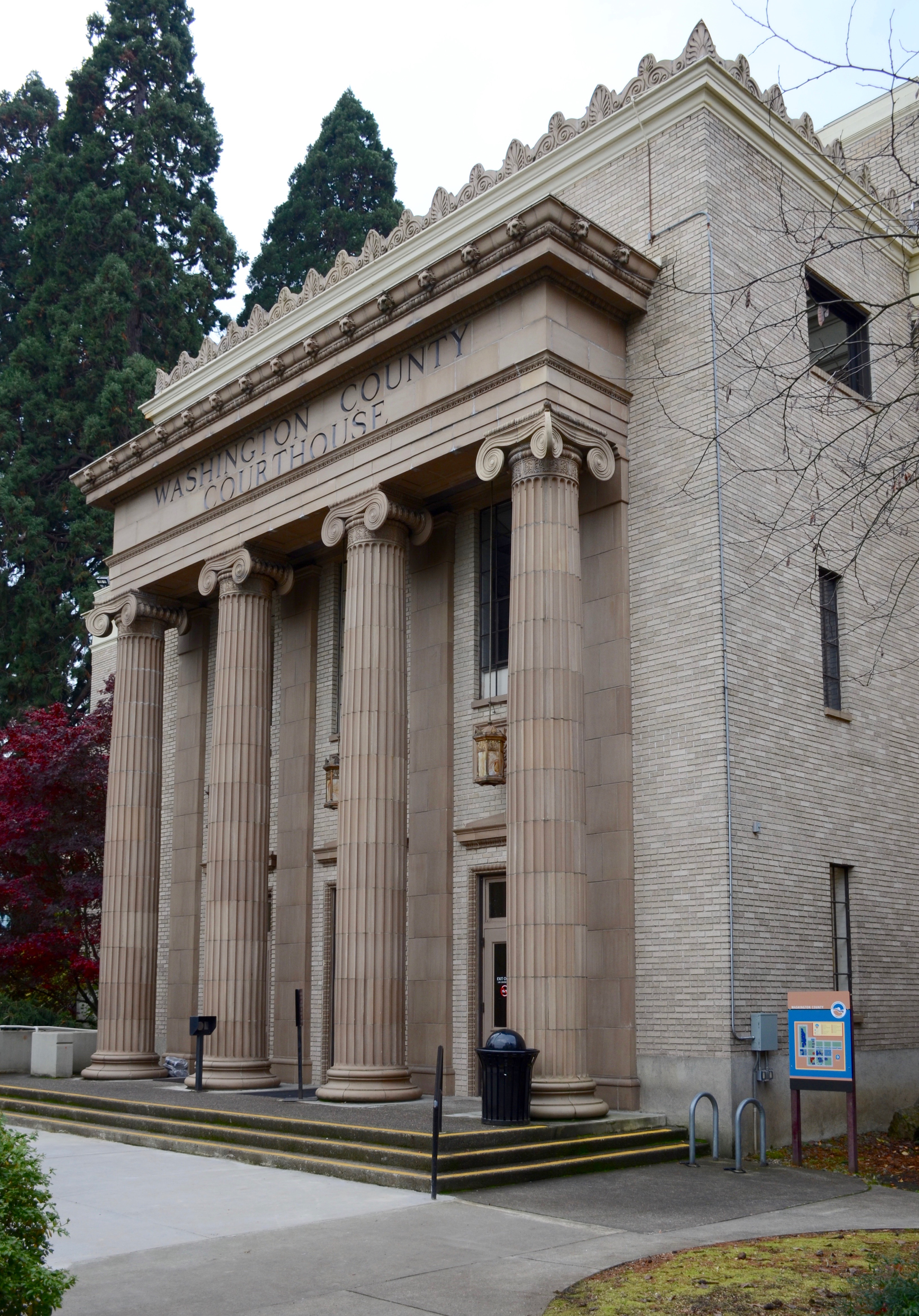
- East facade, the public entrance
- Interactive map of the Washington County Courthouse area

General information
- Type: Courthouse
- Architectural style: Neo-classical
- Location: Hillsboro, Oregon, U.S.
- Coordinates: 45°31′24″N 122°59′20″W
- Construction started: 1928
- Completed: 1930
- Owner: Washington County

Technical details
- Floor count: 3

Design and construction
- Architect: O.R.W. Hossack
- Main contractor: L. L. Young

Other information
- Public transit access: Hatfield Government Center; 46

The Washington County Courthouse in Hillsboro, Oregon is the courthouse for Washington County, Oregon, in the United States. Washington County was established in 1843 and the first government building was finished in 1852. The current courthouse was built in 1928 with an addition and renovations to the structure in 1972. Currently the building houses courtrooms, the county sheriff's dispatch, staff offices, and the office of the district attorney. The county jail was previously attached to the courthouse.

== History ==
Washington County was created as Twality District on July 5, 1843, as part of the Champoeg Meetings that created the Provisional Government of Oregon. The county became Washington County by an act of the Territorial Legislature in 1849, and in 1850 the community that would become Hillsboro was selected as the county seat.

The first courthouse in the county was a log cabin near what is now Northwest 253rd Avenue, located on the land claim of Edward Constable where court sessions were held briefly. In 1850, David Hill sold 40 acres (160,000 m^{2}) and a cabin from his land claim to the county for $200. This cabin was used to house the court until 1852, when a two-story building was finished to serve as the courthouse and center of county government in Hillsboro.

Built of cedar, this building was on land donated by the Kelsey family and located on the same block as the current site of the county courthouse, on the northwest corner of Main and 1st streets in downtown Hillsboro. Designed by A. B. Hallock, the building was 32 by 40 feet (9.8 m × 12.2 m) and built by William Green. Construction began in the middle of 1852 and the county accepted the building on December 8, 1852, at a cost of $3,300.

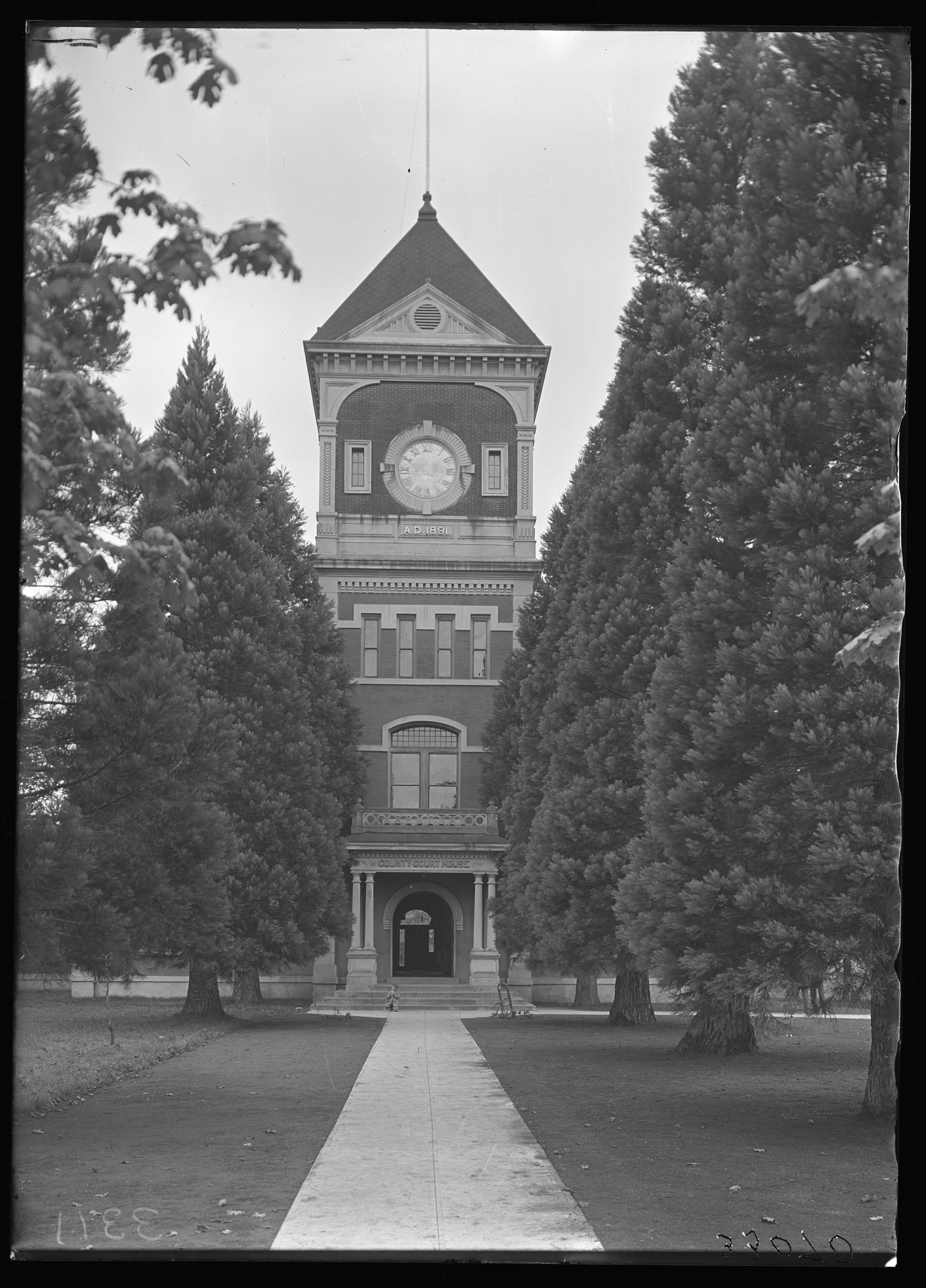
The pre-1928 Washington County courthouse, viewed from the south in 1910

In 1871, the county solicited bids to construct a new, brick courthouse. The winning bid was for $12,500 by Samuel H. Elliott with construction finishing in May 1873. The new building was placed in the middle of the courthouse square, with a picket fence and outhouse added in 1882. The following year the previous two-story courthouse was sold. The brick courthouse was remodeled in the early 1890s when it was expanded and a clock tower added to the building. The clock tower was built in 1891 for a cost of $20,000 and Delos Neer as architect. Part of the cost came from adding steam heating to the courthouse. Though the courthouse had a clock tower, there was no clock and the county did not purchase the clockworks needed for a working clock. In 1897, the first telephone was added to the building. In 1912, the county contracted with Portland contractor William Foster to expand the building at a cost of $32,516.

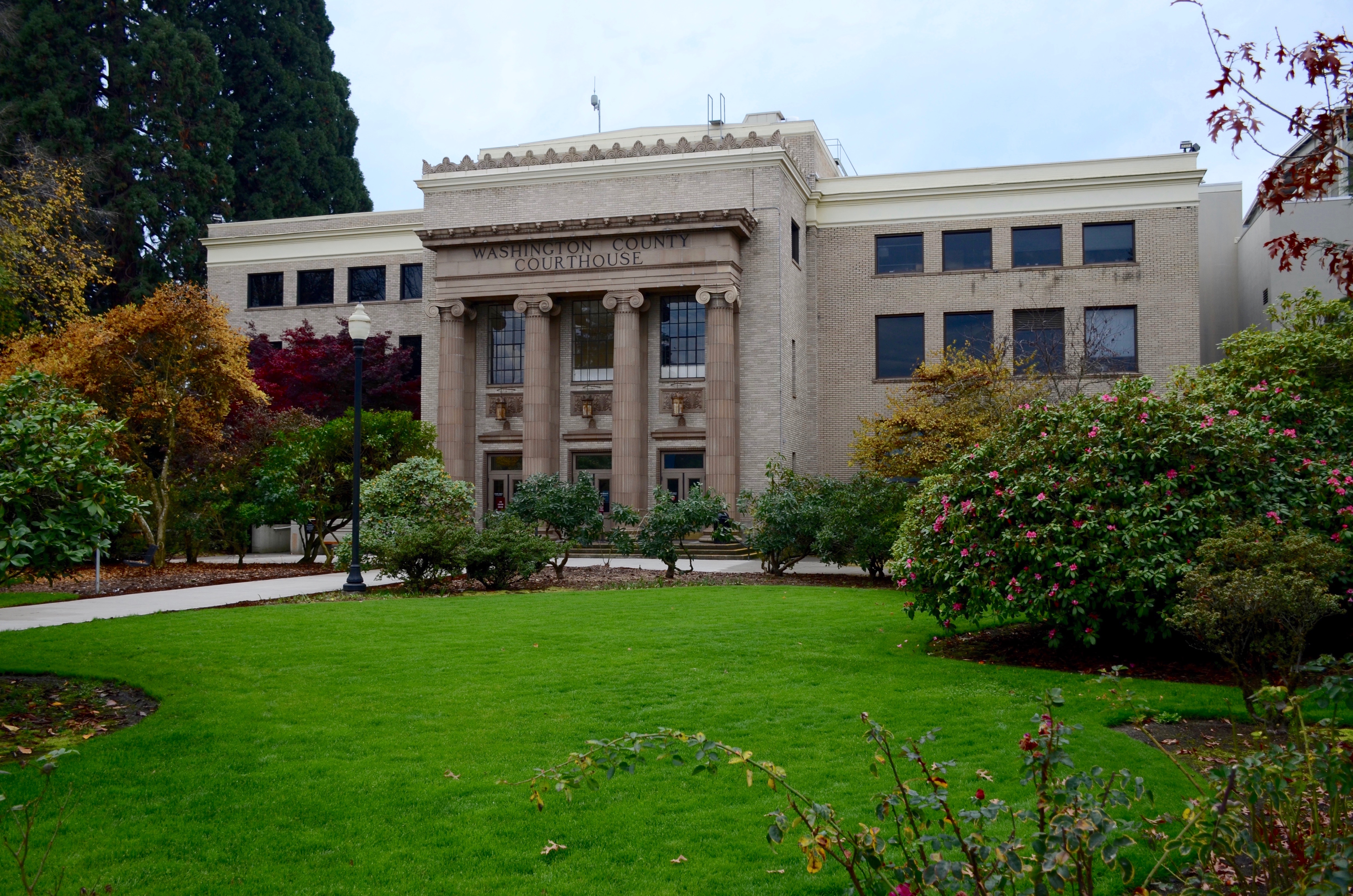
View of the current courthouse and grounds from the east

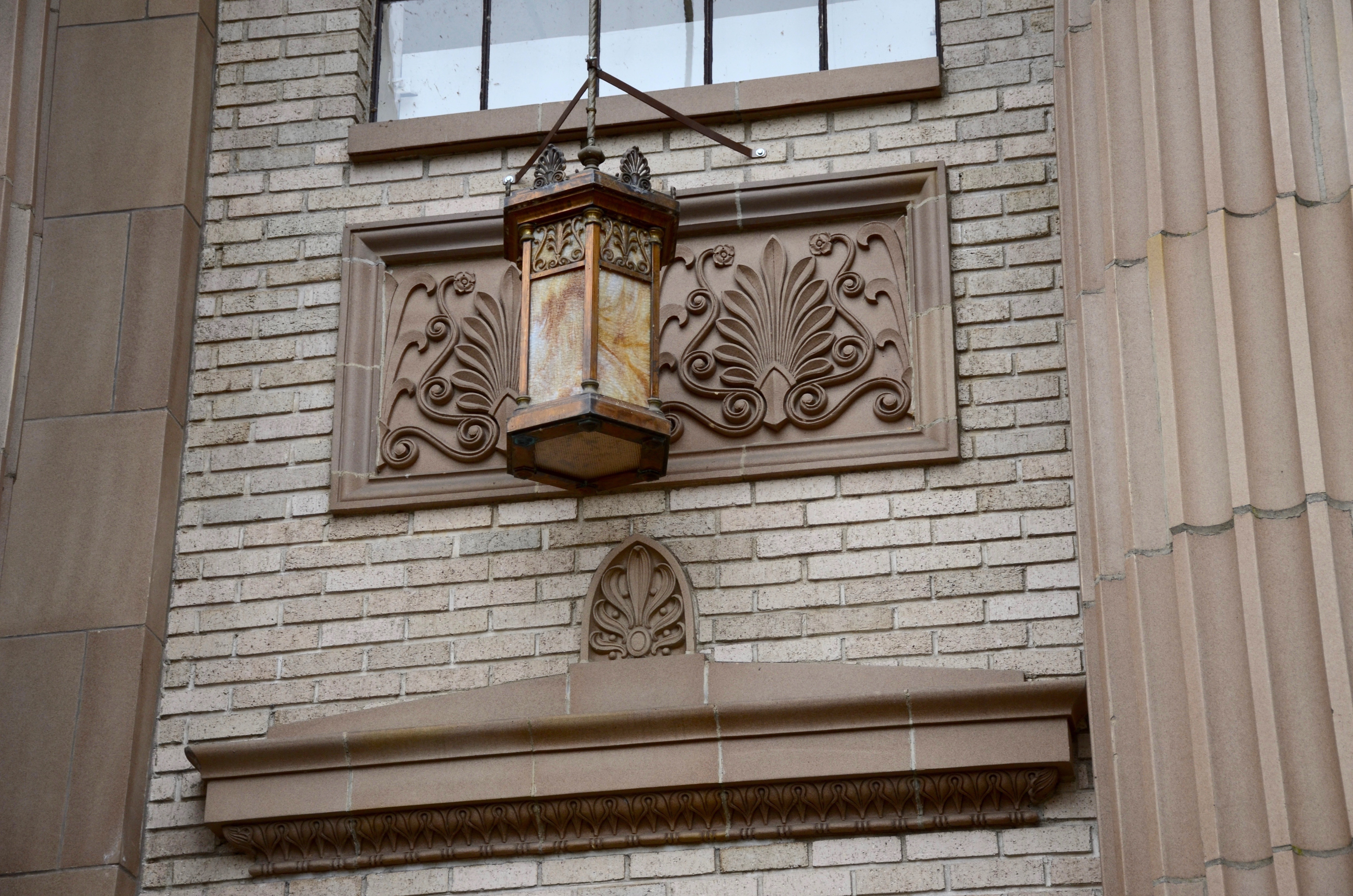
Ornamental bronze lantern above one of the entrance doorways

Beginning in 1927, the county began plans to expand the courthouse. Construction began in 1928 with L. L. Young submitting the winning bid of $126,783. The old building was demolished on April 1, 1928, in front of a crowd of citizens. With the remodel, the current Neoclassical architectural style was adopted and the main entrance was made to face 2nd Street instead of Main Street. O.R.W. Hossack designed the building and included fluted columns with Ionic capitals. In 1930, a two-story jail was completed on the site. The county looked to expand the county government buildings again in 1969, with construction beginning in 1970. The Administrative Annex building was finished in 1973.

== Description ==
The Washington County Courthouse is located on one city block in downtown Hillsboro with East Main Street as the southern boundary, Lincoln Street on the north, First Street on the west, and Second Street bounding on the east. This square has five large sequoia trees that were planted in 1886 with seeds from John Porter, located on the south side of the building. The three-story neo-classical style entrance with four columns faces Second Street. A new county jail built in the early 2000s west of downtown, allowed the use of the old jail by the county sheriff as a dispatch center and prisoner holding area. The current Justice Services Building is home to offices for courtroom staff, judges, accounting offices, courtrooms, and the district attorney for the county. The Hillsboro Civic Center is across Main Street from the courthouse.

== Notable people ==
- Hollie Pihl
