= Tears of Joy Theatre =

Tears of Joy Theatre was a puppet theatre company located in the Portland metropolitan area of Oregon. It was founded in 1971 by Janet and Reg Bradley. The company toured two to four shows a year to schools and civic centers in Oregon, Washington, California, Idaho, Montana, Arizona, Nebraska, Wyoming, and Nevada. It toured libraries and put on mainstage shows in the Portland Metro area yearly. It ended operations August 25, 2019.

== Awards ==
Tears of Joy is the recipient of four Citations of Excellence from UNIMA USA
in Puppetry Arts (issued by the organization Puppeteers of America).

1986 "Petrouchka"
1990 "Jumping Mouse"

1996 "Between Two Worlds/The Dybbuk" based on the folktale written by S. Ansky in 1920. The script was adapted by Mark Levenson, and was directed by Reg Bradley. The play incorporated cantal and kletzmer music and used bunraku style puppets. The puppeteers were in full view of the audience, to represent the spirits and ghosts that haunt the world this tale of deathless love inhabits

2009 "Pinocchio" Directed by Nancy Aldrich and written by Jon Ludwig.

== Past productions ==
=== A chronological list of performances since its debut in 1971. ===
A chronological list of performances since its debut in 1971.

1971-72: The Courageous Dragon, Mumford the Sea Monster, Aslan Meets the Shrinkerman, and Jonah

1972-73: The Legend of Aukelenuiaku, In Babel's Rubble-Fare, and Happy Hours.

1973-74: Nemo of the Four Winds and For Love of Looney.

1974-75: The Bridge of the Gods, Bigfoot in the Backyard, The Breadman Cometh.

1975-76: The Happy Prince, and Alice in Voterland

1976-77: Miser of Tahoma, Trouble at the Fort, and Alice in Wonderland (version 1)

1977-78: Sungura the Hare (version 1)

1978-79: The Black Heart of Indri

1979-80: You Are What You Eat (Nutrition Show), Inanna in the Underworld, and Rime of the Ancient Mariner

1980-81: The Magic Calliope, Onion Skin Soup, THE MASQUE COMPANY

1981-82: Coyote and the Cedar Tree, Faces in Time (MASQUE Co.), Frogs (MASQUE Co.), Sungura the Hare (version 2)

1982-83: Lessons for a Sumo

1983-84: Jabberwocky and A Pig's Tale

1984-85: The Gift

1985-86: Petrushka, The Magic Teakettle, and Opal.

1986-87: Adventures of Fet Frumos

1987-88: Jumping Mouse

1988-89: Baba Yaga and Hamitchou the Miser

1989-90: There's A Nightmare In My Closet and Puppetry in Action

1990-91: Rymchimchi and Aladdin & His Magic Lamp

1991-92 Alice in Wonderland (version 2), Coyote & the Cedar Tree (version 2), and How Coyote Kept His Name

1992-93: No new plays produced.

1993-94: Rumpelstiltskin, Br'er Rabbit Tales, Pure Imagination, and The Lucky Teakettle of Good Fortune

1994-95: Pied Piper, Monkey King, and Between Two Worlds

1995-96: The Amazing Adventures of Coco-Kaba

1996-97: Fire on the Mountain, Toy Box, and It's a Republic, If You Can Keep It

1997-98: Jungle Book, Baba Yaga, and Bridge of the Gods.

1998-99: The Secret of Singbonga

1999-00: Singing Our Way Home

2000-01: Cinderella and Toad Prince

2001-02: Coyote Tales and Perseus: Hero of Ancient Greece

2002-03: Ride the Red Mare

2003-04: Anansi the Spider

2004-05 The Reluctant Dragon and Little One Inch

2005-06: No New Shows

2006-07 The Shoemake and the Elves

2007-08: Pinocchio and Stellaluna

2008-10 No New Shows.

2011-12 When Animals were People, Raven Stories

2012-13 20,000 Leagues Under the Sea and When Animals were People

2014-15 Touring Shows: When Animals were People and The Reluctant Dragon. No new shows were added.

2016-17 Touring Shows: Petroucka, Jungle Book, and Toad Prince. No new shows were added.

2017-18: Touring Shows: Toad Prince and There's a Nightmare in My Closet. Music by Richard Moore. Written by Reg Bradely. Directed by Artistic Director, Tim Giugni. No new shows added.

2018-19 Touring Shows: There's a Nightmare in My Closet and Coyote Stories. No new shows added.

2019 Closed August.

They collaborated with Bag & Baggage Productions in December 2012 for an adaptation of The Velveteen Rabbit.

Several guest directors have collaborated with Tears of Joy: Jan Wilkowski from Poland, Josef Krofta from the Czech Republic, and Yang Feng. In addition, Masaya Kiritaki, master of Otome Bunraku.

In November/December 2006, Tears of Joy produced "To Ride the Red Mare", which former Artistic Director Nancy Aldrich adapted from the book "A Ride On The Red Mare's Back" by Ursula K. Le Guin. Third Angle New Music Ensemble wrote and performed the music.

== See also ==
- Culture of Portland, Oregon
