= Oregon Mandolin Orchestra =

- Short name: OMO
- Founded: 2010
- Location: Portland, Oregon, United States
- Music director: Christian McKee
- Website: oregonmandolinorchestra.org

Oregon Mandolin Orchestra (OMO) is an all-volunteer community orchestra based in Portland, Oregon. Founded in 2010, the OMO consists of about 30 members and has been led by music director Christian McKee since April 2017.

== History ==
The orchestra was started in January 2010 by Brian and Elizabeth Oberlin. It was the first such orchestra in Oregon since the Portland Mandophonic Orchestra stopped performing in 2001. OMO was founded during a revival of mandolin orchestras, which had once been widespread across the United States.

Brian Oberlin is a mandolinist and music teacher who served as the musical director from the orchestra's founding in 2010 through 2017 with his final performance in the spring of 2018, while his then wife Elizabeth was the executive director. Brian also started the River of the West Mandolin Camp. Elizabeth, an attorney by profession, organized the orchestra while Brian recruited members. The orchestra performed its first concert on April 9, 2010, at the Glenn & Viola Walters Cultural Arts Center in downtown Hillsboro. One of the first members of the new group was Bill Jordens, who had been a member of the Milwaukee Mandolin Orchestra in Wisconsin.

OMO's April 2011 concert featured works by Antonio Vivaldi and was held at The Old Church in Portland. The group's May 2011 concert included a version of Led Zeppelin's "Kashmir", as well a pieces from Johann Sebastian Bach and Felix Mendelssohn, among others. At the time of the concert, the orchestra had grown to 24 members.

The group received a grant from the Hillsboro Arts & Culture Council in 2011 and again in 2013. The funds come from the City of Hillsboro's Parks and Recreation Department. By the September 2011 concert, the group had grown to about 30 members, with the concert again held at the Walters Cultural Arts Center. The group also gained sponsorships at that time from The Hillsboro Argus, KUIK, and Tuality Healthcare, among others. Oregon Mandolin Orchestra's 2011 holiday concert in December featured a Brazilian Choro duo as well as a selected portion of the Nutcracker Suite. At the time, it was the only mandolin orchestra in Oregon. OMO's Fall 2013 concert in Hillsboro featured Evan Marshall, while the December 2013 concert featured holiday music.

== Description ==
The Oregon Mandolin Orchestra is modeled after similar orchestras that were popular in the United States during the late 19th century. The current music director is Christian McKee (as of mid-2017). The orchestra features mandolins, mandolas, mandocellos, mandobass, string bass on occasion, and classical guitars. The approximately 30-piece group presents about four concerts each year across the Portland area.
