= Venetian Theatre =

Venetian Hillsboro
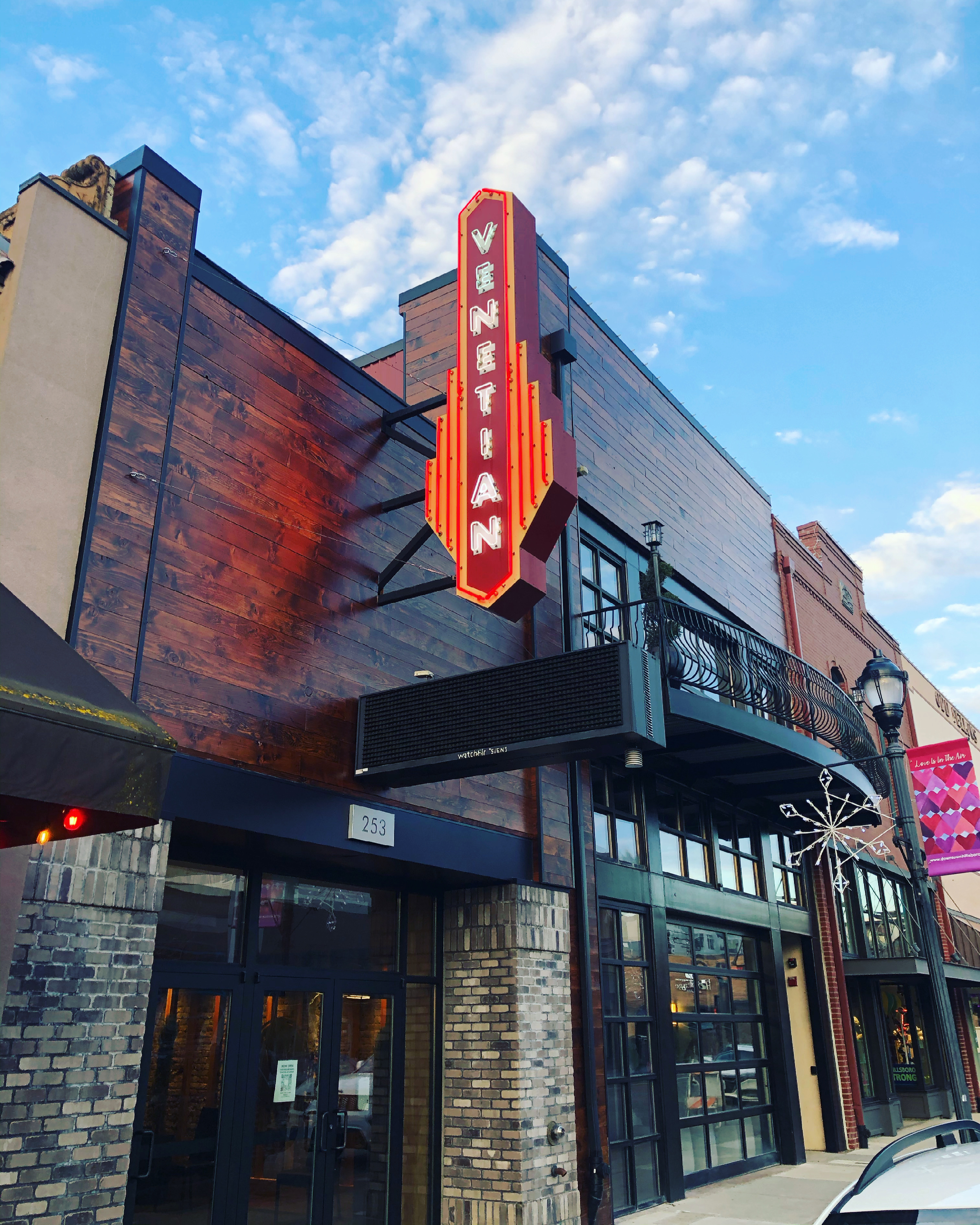
- Venetian Hillsboro, renovated in 2020, opened as a restaurant & venue. Now operates as a venue with multiple rentable spaces.

General information
- Status: Venetian Hillsboro | Venetian Ballroom | Venue
- Location: Hillsboro, Oregon, United States
- Coordinates: 45°31′22″N 122°59′14″W
- Construction started: 1925
- Completed: 1925
- Renovated: 2007–2008 | 2020-2021

Renovating team
- Architect: Ralph Hill
- Renovating firm: Partin and Hill Architects | NW Event Management Group, Inc.

Venetian Hillsboro, last known as the Venetian Theatre & Bistro, is a former movie theater and performing arts venue in downtown Hillsboro, Oregon, United States, which since 2022 has been in use by a venue named Venetian Hillsboro. Formerly the Town Theater, the building re-opened in 2008 after more than a decade of inactivity and revitalization plans. Built in 1888 as a bank, mayor Orange Phelps converted the property into a theater in 1911 and in 1925 converted it into a two-story Italianate building with a larger auditorium. Prior to renovation the theater was owned by the city of Hillsboro who purchased it from Act III Theatres.

When it underwent renovation and reopened in 2008, a jointly owned restaurant now occupied part of the space. The theater and restaurant closed in April 2017 in connection with a planned change of ownership. The theater's closure ultimately became permanent. The early 2017 sale fell through, and the building remained closed indefinitely. A new buyer purchased the building in April 2020 and indicated his plans to reopen it with a new restaurant but to convert the theater space into a ballroom. The restaurant opened in November 2020, with the name Venetian Hillsboro. By that time, the seats been removed from the former theater space and its gradual conversion into a ballroom was underway. The Venetian restaurant opened and closed numerous times due to COVID-19 restrictions in the state of Oregon, and then again following the January 2022 fire in Downtown Hillsboro. Following a brief reopen in March 2022 and its eventual closure in July 2022, the owner took focus to reviving the business with rentable spaces as a venue.

== History ==
In 1888, banker John W. Shute built a two-story building on East Main Street as the new home for the First National Bank of Hillsboro. The structure featured a façade in the Italianate style of architecture, external cast iron ornamentation, and a roof line with a bracketed cornice. In 1911, the bank moved across Main Street and later mayor Orange Phelps purchased the building. Although Phelps did not have the money to buy the building, the bank loaned him the funds and he opened The Grand Theater, a 200-seat theater. The 19 feet (5.8 m) wide by 120 feet (37 m) long theater was expanded in 1915 to 500 seats and named the Liberty Theater.

In 1925, a fire destroyed the theater and Phelps rebuilt the structure and named the new theater The Venetian. The first motion picture with sound shown in Hillsboro was The Broadway Melody in 1929 at the theater. Beginning in 1935 Phelps held an annual free show for children at Christmas which continued into the 1990s. In 1956, a fire gutted the building, with Phelps rebuilding and opening the following year as the 800-plus seat Town Theater. After the fire Phelps had held double features at his Town Theater. In 1961, the theater hosted the premiere of the film Ring of Fire, which had been filmed in Vernonia, Oregon. Phelps owned the theater along with several other theaters in Washington County into the 1970s. Tom Moyer Theaters purchased Phelps’ theaters in 1978 and in turn sold all of that theater chain's screens to Act III Theatres in 1989. In 1996, Act III closed the theater and sold the building to the city for $1,500.

After purchasing the property the city proposed several redevelopment ideas for the building, including selling it to the McMenamins brewpub chain for a theater and pub. In 2001, Hillsboro purchased the adjoining 5,000-square-foot (460 m^{2}) building (home to Music Village at the time) for $160,000 to add to the property to be used for any redevelopment of the theater. The city solicited ideas for the redevelopment of the building in early 2007. While under city ownership the space was briefly used as storage for the Hillsboro Farmers’ Market and faced possible demolition as estimates for the cost to renovate the structure continually increased.

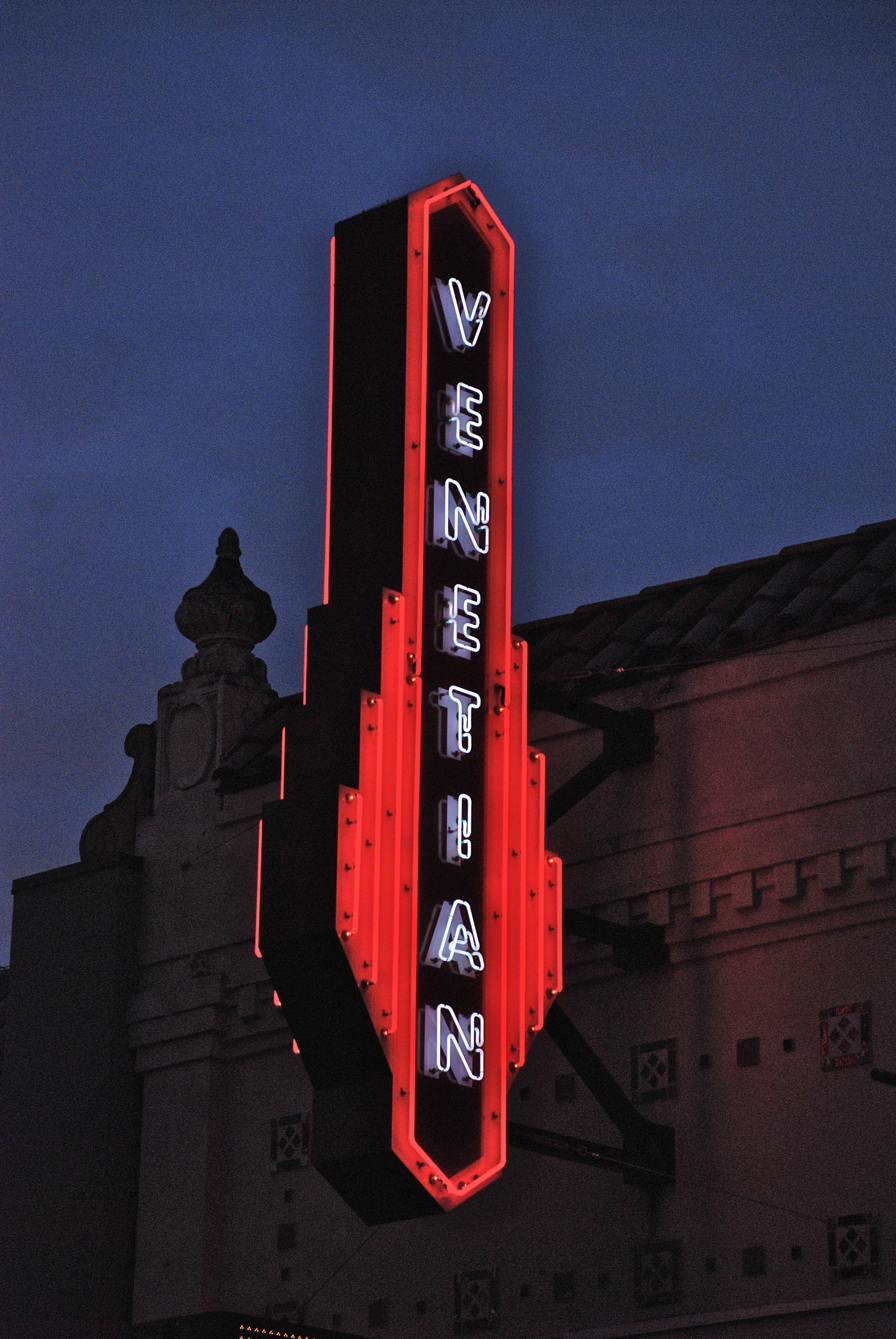
The Venetian's main neon sign at night

In August 2007, the city sold the building to developer Denzil Scheller for $10 and gave him $750,000 to assist in the renovation of the deteriorating building. Scheller spent $2.5 million to renovate the space and bring the building up to modern fire, earthquake, and disability access codes. Of this $2.5 million, around $1.5 million came from his own funds, and the remainder came from city funds along with $250,000 from Metro in the conversion of the space into a theater, meeting space, restaurant, and live event venue. Work included gutting the building to rebuild the support structure, removing asbestos, and opening a wall into the adjacent Music Village building. Local architectural firm Partin and Hill Architects designed the renovations.

Scheller renamed the theater as The Venetian, returning to the former name, with the distinct yellow marquee of the Town Theater removed in September 2007. The re-opening of the theater is part of the city's plan to create a regional arts center in the downtown core and attract more people after 5:00 p.m. when county and city offices close. On July 9, 2008, the new The Venetian Theatre and Bistro opened with the theater portion opening on July 11. In September 2008, Bag & Baggage Productions became the resident theater company at the theater and opened their new season with Steel Magnolias. In October 2010, the renovation of the theater was awarded the Outstanding Achievement in Design award from the Oregon Main Street organization.

In early 2017, owner Denzil Scheller reported that he had reached a tentative agreement to sell the theater to a buyer who, for now, wished to remain anonymous. The theater would close at the end of the day on April 13, temporarily, while the sale was finalized, to reopen at an unknown date. The theater remained closed as of August 2017, and the Hillsboro Tribune reported that the planned sale earlier in the year had fallen through, with owner Scheller saying the buyer had "disappeared" without explanation just before completing the purchase. In August 2017, Scheller told the Tribune that he had found a new buyer, but without revealing any additional details.

In April 2020, the still-vacant building was purchased by John Lee, who told the News-Times in May that he planned to reopen it with a new, upscale restaurant and to remake the theater space into a ballroom. It is unclear whether Lee is the buyer to whom former owner Scheller had been referring–but not by name–when interviewed by the Hillsboro Tribune in August 2017.

A grand opening for the restaurant that was set for November 2020 was canceled at a late stage because of a newly imposed two-week ban on indoor dining imposed by Oregon Governor Kate Brown in response to a surge in new cases of COVID-19. The restaurant opened in mid-February 2021, with the name Venetian Hillsboro. By that time, the seats been removed from the former theater space and its gradual conversion into what the News-Times referred to as a "ballroom-style space" was underway. The Venetian Hillsboro now rents its available spaces for private and public events.

== Details ==
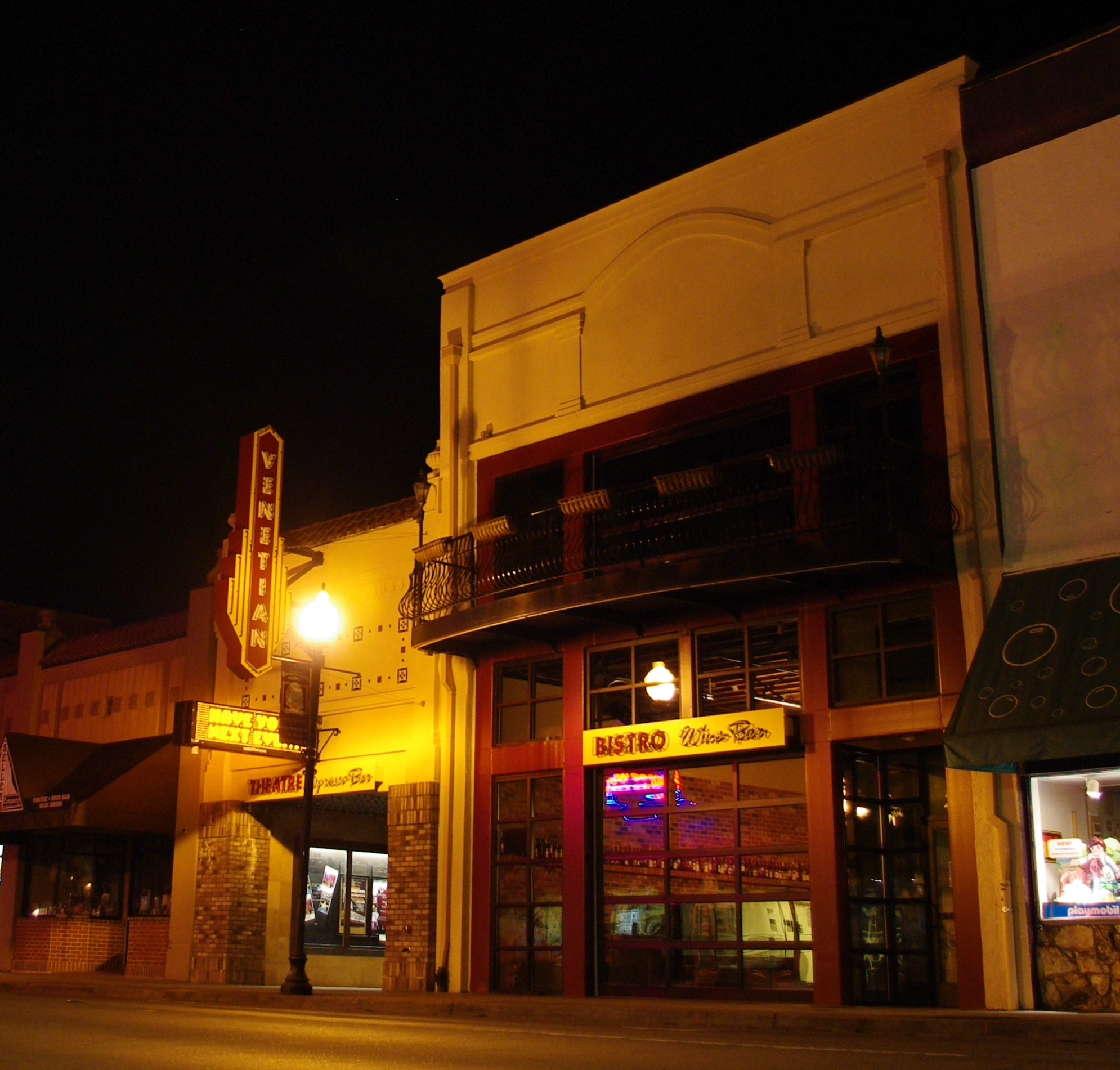
The theater at night (after closing time)

Located in downtown Hillsboro on Main Street between Second and Third avenues, the theater is one block north of the Hillsboro Central MAX light rail station. Until its closure in 2017, the 16,000-square-foot (1,500 m^{2}) space included a 370-seat theater as well as a restaurant with an upstairs balcony. It reopened in 2021 with a new restaurant, and with the former theater space undergoing conversion into a ballroom. The balcony sits above Main Street and has roll-up windows. On the exterior are decorative terra cotta urns and red colored roof tiles on Main Street. Designed to encourage late night patronage of the downtown area, the building's 2007–2008 renovation was considered a centerpiece of revitalization efforts of that part of Hillsboro. Prior to its subsequent closure, in 2017, the theater exhibited movies, presented live performances, was a live music venue.
