= Hillsboro Civic Center =

City hall in Hillsboro, Oregon, US

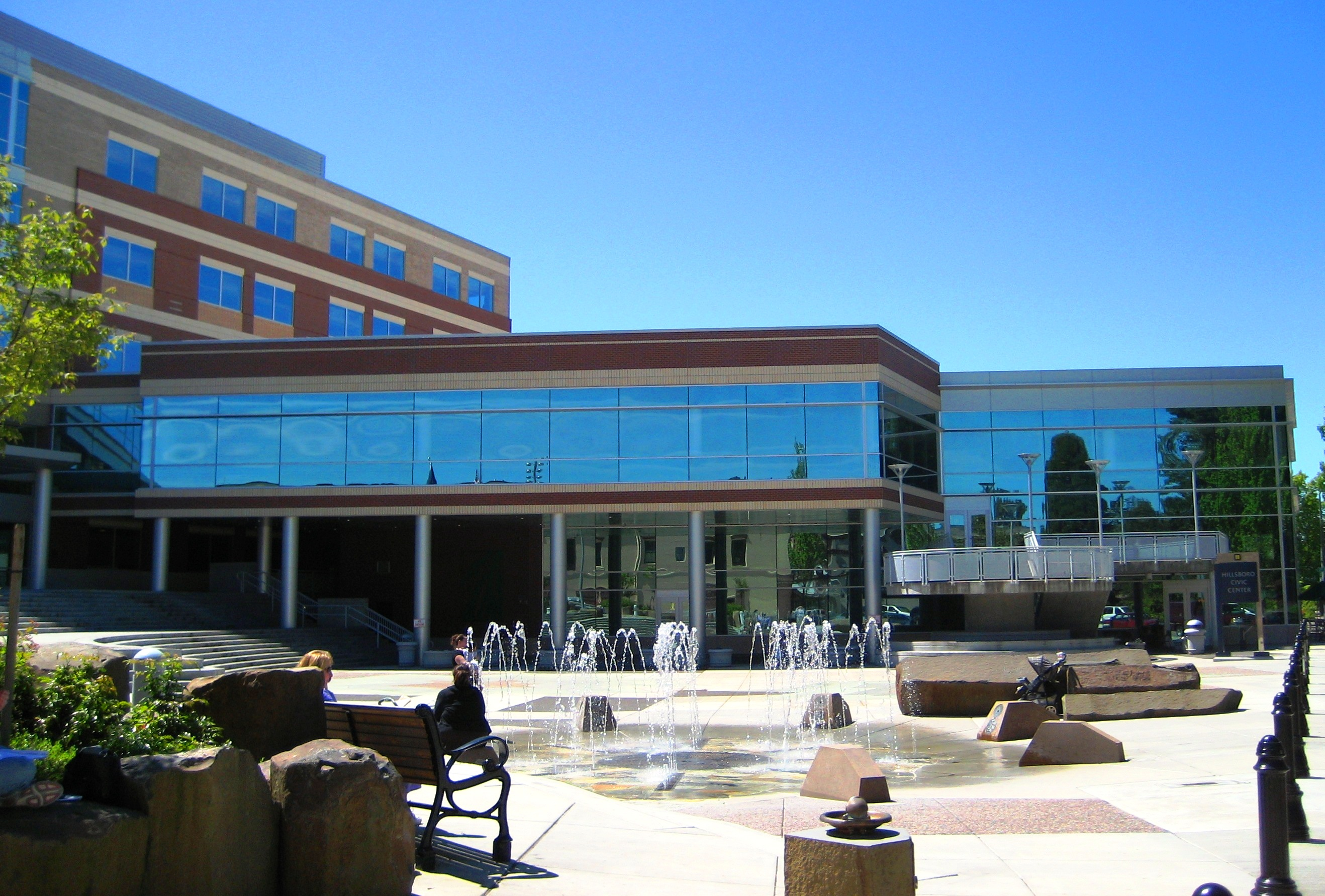
- The north side of the Center.
- Interactive map of the Hillsboro Civic Center area

General information
- Type: City hall
- Location: Hillsboro, Oregon, United States
- Coordinates: 45.521994°N 122.989127°W
- Current tenants: City of Hillsboro; Starbucks
- Construction started: 2003
- Completed: 2005
- Owner: City of Hillsboro

Height
- Height: 78 feet (24 m), 6 stories

Technical details
- Floor count: 5 stories (one level of above ground parking)
- Floor area: 168,436 square feet (15,648.2 m^{2})

Design and construction
- Architect: LRS Architects
- Structural engineer: KPFF
- Services engineer: Interface Engineering
- Civil engineer: WRG Design
- Main contractor: Skanska Construction USA
- Awards: LEED Gold Certified

The Hillsboro Civic Center is a government-built, mixed-use development in downtown Hillsboro, Oregon, United States. The development includes the city hall for the county seat of Washington County, located west of Portland, Oregon. Covering 6 acres (24,000 m^{2}), the Civic Center has a total of over 165,000 square feet (15,300 m^{2}) in the complex. The total of six stories for the main structure makes the building the tallest in the city, tied with Tuality Community Hospital. In addition to government offices, the Civic Center includes retail space, public plazas, and residential housing. The complex was built to centralize city government functions under one roof.

Design of the complex began in 2002, with construction beginning in 2003. After completion in 2005, the building was awarded the LEED Gold certification for sustainability, the second city hall in the United States to earn that distinction. Environmentally friendly technologies used include occupancy sensors, ventilation that monitors carbon dioxide levels to determine when to activate, high performance exterior glass to reduce heat loss, and solar panels to generate electricity.

== History ==
Plans for the 6-acre (24,000 m^{2}) complex began as part of the city’s 2020 comprehensive plan. Development plans from six teams of developers and architects were submitted to the city in October 2001. These plans included designs for public plazas, a library branch, residential units, retail space, and a new city hall. Formal design proposals were submitted in early 2002. The project was designed to consolidate city government and to anchor redevelopment of the downtown core that would reinvigorate downtown. This included the plan to turn the area into a zone with 18 hours of activity each day, instead of businesses closing at 5:00 pm when the city and county governments closed. Additionally, conference space was planned to accommodate use by both city and county governments, and by private groups.

In April 2002, Specht Properties was selected as the developer of the project after scoring higher with the council appointed committee formed to rate each of three developer's proposals, with Gerding Edlen Development and Trammell Crow Company losing out to Specht. Construction on the complex began in June 2003 when an old grain store at the site was demolished to make room for the center. A total of eight buildings were torn down to make room the complex as part of a redevelopment of a brownfield site.

Plans also called for retail space, housing units, and a library branch. Though the library section was built, a library branch did not open at the site. LRS Architects designed the complex with Skanska USA serving as the general contractor. The structural engineering was done by KPFF Consulting Engineers, services engineering was completed by Interface Engineering, and civil engineering for the project was handled by WRG Design.

The building was finished in January 2005 with city officials and employees moving into the buildings by the end of March. A public grand opening was held on July 16, 2005, to officially open the center. Total cost of the public portion of the project was $34 million, with construction totaling $23.5 million. Prior to completion the city leased space in several downtown buildings, including the county's Public Services Building where Hillsboro also held city council meetings. Later in 2005 a coffee shop was added as a tenant in part of the retail space, and in 2007 the restaurant space in the building was leased to NW Hayden Enterprises for a restaurant scheduled to open in 2008. In April 2009, the plaza was renamed as the Tom Hughes Civic Center Plaza in honor of Tom Hughes, who was mayor when the building was constructed.

== Architecture ==
Designed by Portland-based firm, LRS Architects, Hillsboro's Civic Center is a modern glass building with a stone base and brick highlights. There are two main buildings, the Civic Center housing government offices and the Plaza Building housing retail space. The plazas surrounding the structures contain an inlaid quartzite river, basalt planters, and Victorian style benches. Additionally, it was designed with large windows facing the north in order to reflect the giant sequoia trees located across the street at the Washington County Courthouse, with the trees dating back to the 1880s.

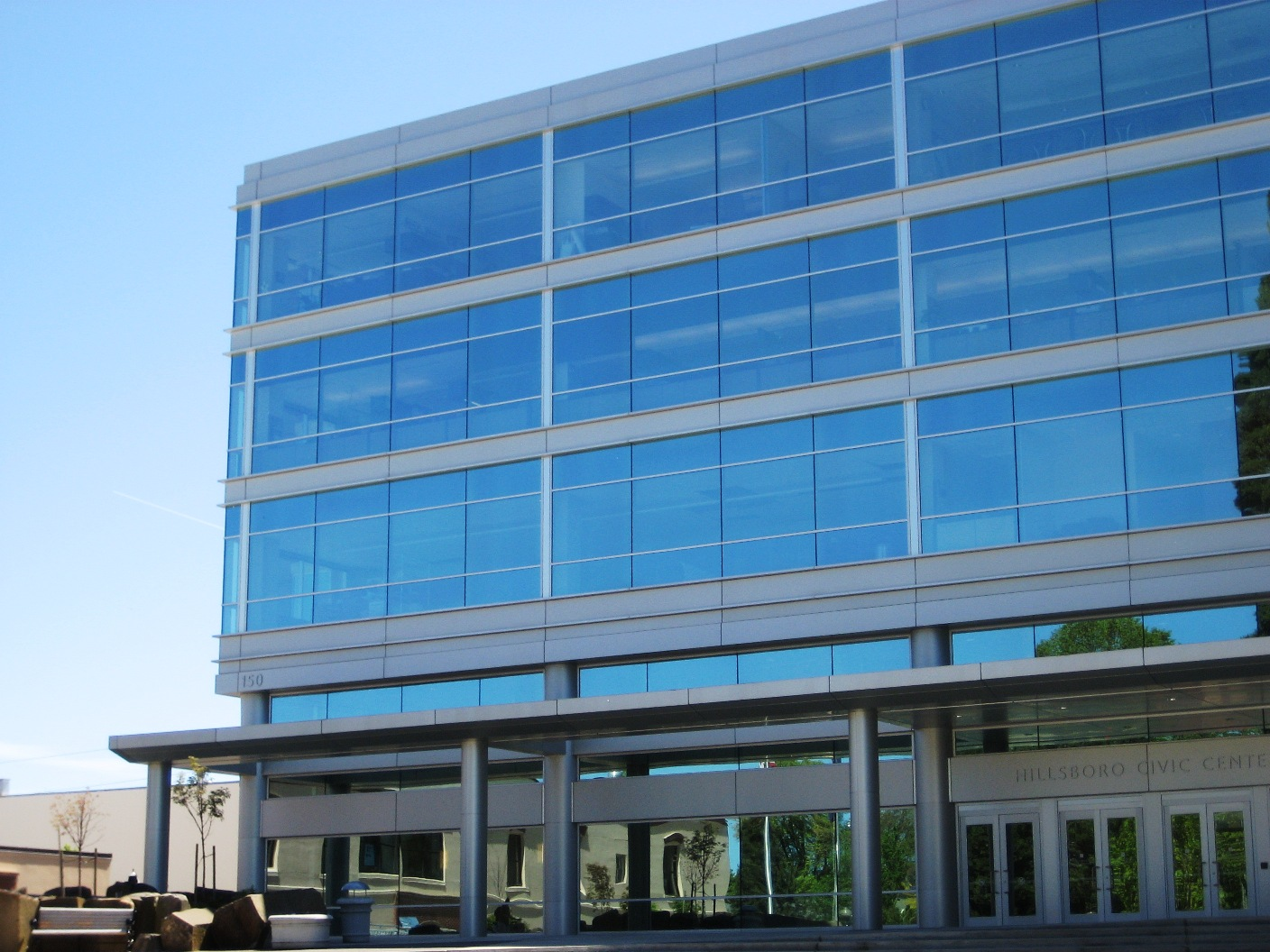
Government offices at the Civic Center

At a total of six stories tall, the building is tied for the tallest building in Hillsboro with Tuality Community Hospital standing 78 feet (24 m) tall. Inside the building features high ceilings on the first floor and a large, open public space. Daylight and exterior views are present in 90% of the offices in city hall.

=== Awards ===
Hillsboro Civic Center won the award for Best Public Project in the state of Oregon for 2005 from Northwest Construction magazine for the general contractor Skanska USA. It is the first municipal headquarters in Oregon to meet all its energy needs with renewable sources. During development, the project first aimed for attaining a Silver certification from the United States Green Building Council. Instead, the project was awarded the Leadership in Energy and Environmental Design Gold certification for environmental sustainability by the U.S. Green Building Council's Leadership. This was the second Gold rating given to a city hall in the U.S. after Seattle’s city hall earned the distinction, and the seventh building in Oregon to earn that level of certification.

Contributing factors leading to this award included that during construction, 92% of construction waste was recycled, and non-wood wheat board was used in some of the walls. Additionally, 18 solar panels were installed on the building to generate power for use in the building, with the city purchasing all additional power through renewable power sources, funded in part by Portland General Electric and the Bonneville Environmental Foundation, while the building is 42% more energy efficient than comparable buildings. Other environmental friendly amenities include occupancy sensors, ventilation that monitors carbon dioxide levels to determine when to activate, high performance exterior glass to reduce heat loss, infrared bathroom fixtures, and the use of recycled building materials among other items.

== Amenities and use ==
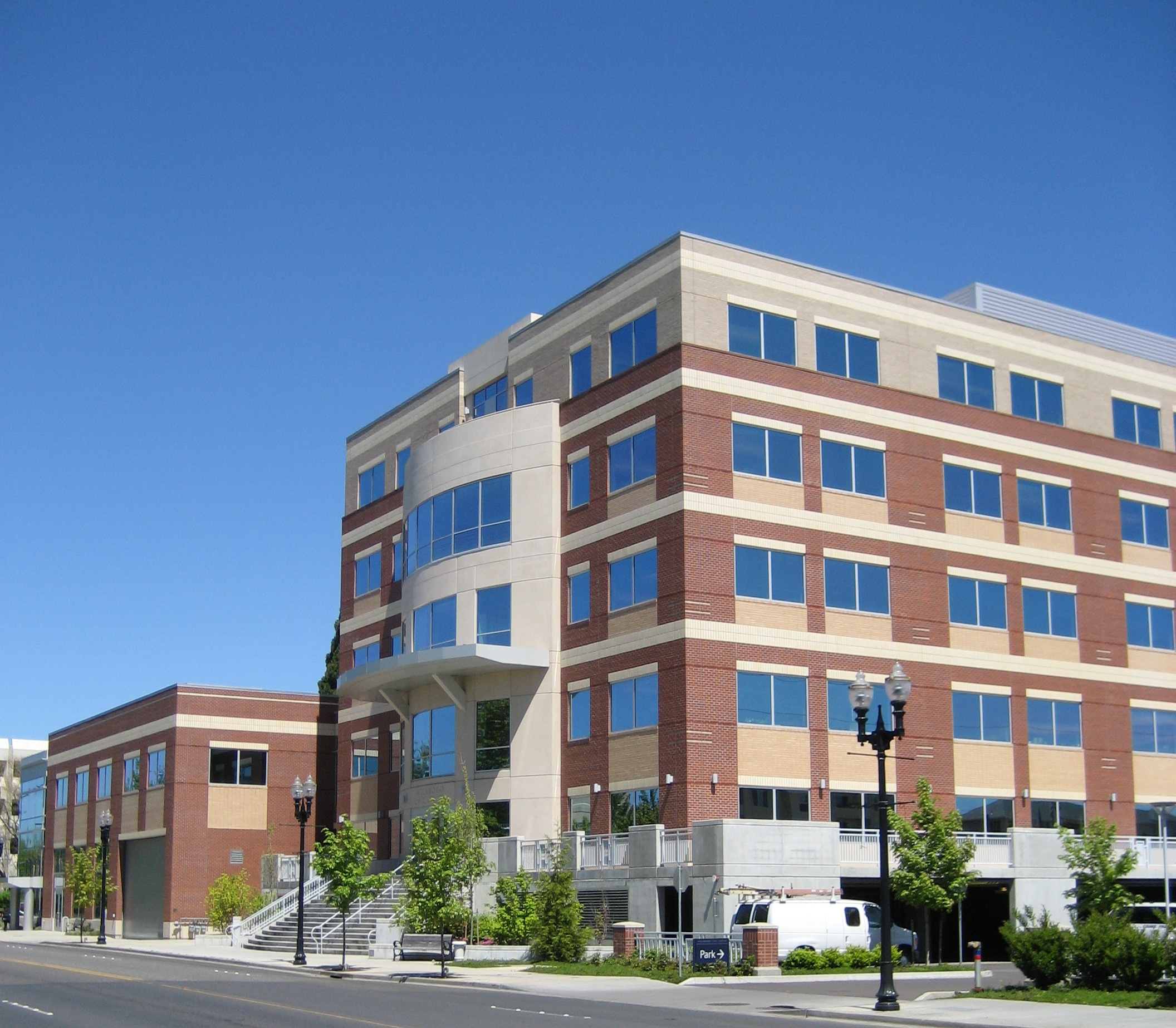
The west side of the Civic Center, across 1st Street at Washington Street

The Civic Center was built over three city blocks in downtown. The complex has a total of 168,436 square feet (15,648.2 m^{2}). The complex has two plazas, with the northern plaza designed to create an outdoor amphitheater with seating for 700. Dedicated as the Tom Hughes Civic Center Plaza, the buildings of the Civic Center serve as a backdrop to the amphitheater, and by using Main Street to increase the space, the amphitheater can accommodate crowds of 5,000 people. South Plaza connects the government portions of the complex to the 120-unit residential component of the development to the south. Both plazas have water features, including a fountain in the 24,000-square-foot (2,200 m^{2}) North Plaza.

On the ground floor of the center's north wing (called the Plaza Building) is a Starbucks coffee shop in a 1,600-square-foot (150 m^{2}) space, while the 20,000 square feet (1,900 m^{2}) designed for the library branch remained open for future government use in 2005. Most of the second floor of the Plaza Building was occupied for five years by the Washington County Museum, which moved into the rented space in fall 2012 but moved back to its previous location, at Portland Community College's Rock Creek campus, in fall 2017.

In the government areas there is a 3,800-square-foot (350 m^{2}) conference center and the city council chambers. This includes a 250-seat auditorium. The Civic Center hosts the seasonal, weekly farmer’s market on Saturdays, and a marketplace on Tuesdays that features various vendors, both utilizing the center’s plaza area. As of 2007, plans called for an upscale restaurant in a 3,800-square-foot (350 m^{2}) space. City services at the site include the Administration Department, city planning, the office of the city recorder, and the municipal court among others. The Civic Center also houses the office of the mayor and is the site of the twice-monthly city council meetings.
