= Lists of Oregon-related topics =

These are lists of Oregon-related topics, attempting to list every list related to the state of Oregon.

- If the type is list, the article is primarily a list of articles. If type is context, each entry contains summary information useful to compare and contrast entries.
- Approx. entries was the number of article entries within the article at one time. The value can be helpful for determining the relevancy or depth of the article.

Article name (§ indicates Oregon-specific sections of broader topic)	Topic category	Type	Approx. entries
American Viticultural Area § List of Pacific Northwest AVAs	agriculture	list	22
Dance in Oregon	culture	list	6
Examples of New Urbanism § Oregon	culture	list	7
Lighthouses in the United States § Oregon	transportation	list	17
List of airports in Oregon	transportation	context	109
List of arches in Oregon	geography	context	15
List of artists and art institutions in Portland, Oregon	culture	list	71
List of banks of the United States of America § Oregon	institutions	list	7
List of bars in Oregon	geography	context	156
List of beaches in Oregon	geography	context	51
List of bridges in the United States § Oregon	transportation	list	35
List of bridges on U.S. Route 101 in Oregon	transportation	list	96
List of butterflies of Oregon	nature	list	175
List of Carnegie libraries in Oregon	institutions	context	31
List of casinos in Oregon	institutions	context	9
List of chief justices of the Oregon Supreme Court	government	context	59
List of Chinook Jargon placenames	history	context	161
List of canals in Oregon	structures	context	661
List of census-designated places in Oregon by population	geography	context	135
List of cities in Oregon	geography	context	242
List of cities and unincorporated communities in Oregon	geography	context	588
List of cities on the Columbia River	geography	list	19
List of city nicknames in the United States § Oregon	geography	list	60
List of college athletic programs in Oregon	sports	list	30
List of colleges and universities in Oregon	institutions	context	87
List of counties in Oregon	geography	list + map	36
List of crossings of the Columbia River	transportation	list	16
List of crossings of the Molalla River	transportation	list	7
List of crossings of the Snake River	transportation	context	14
List of crossings of the Willamette River	transportation	list	47
List of distilleries in Portland, Oregon	institutions	list	9
List of electricity generating facilities in Oregon	institutions	context	29
List of facts on incorporated cities in Oregon	geography	context	11
List of films shot in Oregon	culture	context	356
List of former cities in Oregon	geography	context	8
List of fossiliferous stratigraphic units in Oregon	natural	context	62
List of ghost towns in Oregon	geography	list	50
List of glaciers § Oregon	natural	list	40
List of governors of Oregon	politics	context	47
List of high schools in Oregon	education	list	372
List of hospitals in Oregon	institutions	list	64
List of hospitals in Portland, Oregon	institutions	list	25
List of hydroelectric dams on the Columbia River	structures	list	4
List of Indian reservations in Oregon	culture	list	12
List of law enforcement agencies in Oregon	law	context	89
List of law schools in the United States	education	context	3
List of libraries in Oregon	culture	list	144
List of lighthouses on the Oregon Coast	geography	context	14
List of Linfield College People	biographical	context	17
List of local children's television series (United States) § Oregon	culture	list	10
List of Marinas § Oregon	institutions	list	17
List of mayors of Bend, Oregon	politics	list	35
List of mayors of Eugene, Oregon	politics	list	39
List of mayors of Hillsboro, Oregon	politics	list	41
List of mayors of Milwaukie, Oregon	politics	list	31
List of mayors of places in Oregon	politics	list	25
List of mayors of Portland, Oregon	politics	list	52
List of mines in Oregon	natural	list	595
List of named state highways in Oregon	transportation	list	322
List of National Historic Landmarks in Oregon	culture	context	17
List of National Natural Landmarks § Oregon	natural	list	6
List of National Wild and Scenic Rivers § Oregon	natural	list	43
List of National Wildlife Refuges § Oregon	natural	list	24
List of native Oregon plants	natural	list	43
List of National Natural Landmarks in Oregon	natural	list	6
List of nature centers in Oregon	institutions	context	21
List of newspapers in Oregon	media	list	109
List of Oregon ballot measures	politics	context	837
List of Oregon birds	natural	list	531
List of Oregon Civil War units	government	context	1
List of Oregon county name etymologies	geography	context	36
List of Oregon covered bridges	transportation	context	51
List of Oregon judges	law	context	188
List of Oregon-related topics	meta	list	200
List of Oregon state symbols	politics	context	26
List of lakes in Oregon	natural	list	62
List of mountain ranges of Oregon	natural	list	55
List of mountain passes in Oregon	natural	list	317
List of parks in Portland, Oregon	geography	list	279
List of Oregon railroads	transportation	list	39
List of Oregon state forests	government	list	5
List of Oregon state agencies	government	list	171
List of Oregon state parks	government	list	185
List of Oregon prisons and jails	institutions	list	15
List of Oregon shipwrecks	transportation	list	136
List of Oregon State University alumni	biographical	context	273
List of Oregon State University faculty and staff	biographical	context	83
List of Oregon wineries and vineyards	institutions	context	42
List of people executed in Oregon	law	context	2
List of people from Hillsboro, Oregon	biographical	list	34
List of people from Oregon	biographical	context	66
List of people from Portland, Oregon	biographical	context	158
List of political parties in Oregon	politics	list	11
List of presidents of the Oregon State Senate	government	context	82
List of private-use airports in Oregon	transportation	context	354
List of radio stations in Oregon	media	context	280
List of Registered Historic Places in Oregon	history	list	936
List of Registered Historic Places in Jackson County, Oregon	history	list	146
List of Registered Historic Places in Lane County, Oregon	history	list	125
List of Registered Historic Places in Marion County, Oregon	history	list	106
List of Registered Historic Places in Multnomah County, Oregon	history	list	541
List of rivers in Oregon	natural	list	152
List of school districts in Oregon	education	list	179
List of ski areas and resorts in the United States § Oregon	institutions	list	14
List of shopping malls in Oregon	institutions	context	21
List of speakers of the Oregon House of Representatives	politics	context	64
List of streetcar systems in the United States § Oregon	transportation	list	12
List of student newspapers in the United States of America § Oregon	media	list	19
List of U.S. state name etymologies	history	context	3
List of tallest buildings in Portland, Oregon	architecture	context	38
List of television stations in Oregon	media	list	46
List of trolleybus systems in the United States § Oregon	transportation	list	1
List of national forests of the United States § Oregon	government	list	11
List of United States representatives from Oregon	politics	context	70
List of United States senators from Oregon	politics	context	42
List of University of Oregon people	biographical	context	255
List of waterfalls in Oregon	natural	list	246
List of weekly newspapers in the United States § Oregon	media	list	3
List of whitewater rivers § Oregon	natural	list	87
List of power stations in Oregon	institutions	list	46
List of ABC television affiliates (by U.S. state) § Oregon	media	list	5
List of aquaria in the United States § Oregon	institutions	list	4
List of boarding schools § Oregon	education	list	8
List of botanical gardens and arboretums in Oregon	institutions	list	21
List of breweries in Oregon	institutions	list	52
List of broadcast stations owned by CBS Radio § Oregon	media	list	6
List of community colleges in Oregon	education	list	17
List of dental schools in the United States § Oregon	education	list	1
List of exits on Interstate 5 § Oregon	transportation	list	136
List of FBI Field Offices § Oregon	law	list	1
List of federally recognized Native American tribes in Oregon	culture	list	11
List of fiction set in Oregon	culture	context	94
List of FieldTurf installations § Oregon	institutions	list	20
List of former United States counties § Oregon	geography	list	3
List of fossil parks § Oregon	natural	list	1
List of Historic Civil Engineering Landmarks § Oregon	structures	list	3
List of highway route numbers in Oregon	transportation	context	183
List of horse racing venues § Oregon	institutions	list	1
List of interurban railways in North America § Oregon commuter railroads	transportation	list	6
List of Italian-American Neighborhoods § Oregon	culture	list	1
List of leading shopping streets and districts by city § Oregon	institutions	list	1
List of LGBT community centers § Oregon	culture	list	6
List of mountains of the United States § Oregon	natural	list	13
List of museums in Oregon	culture	list	202
List of NBC television affiliates (by U.S. state) § Oregon	media	list	7
List of nursing schools in the United States § Oregon	education	list	3
List of old growth forests § United States	natural	list	14
List of public administration schools § Oregon	education	list	2
List of dams and reservoirs in the United States § Oregon	structures	list	40
List of road-rail bridges § Oregon	transportation	context	1
List of Oregon shipwrecks	transportation	context	216
List of social nudity places in North America § Oregon	culture	list	10
List of statues § Oregon	culture	list	2
List of steamboats on the Columbia River	transportation	context	68
List of symphony orchestras in the United States § Oregon	institutions	list	9
List of Telemundo affiliates § Oregon	institutions	list	4
List of tool-lending libraries § Oregon	institutions	list	6
List of TriMet transit centers	transportation	context	24
List of tunnels in the United States § Oregon	transportation	list	21
List of U.S. cities in multiple counties § Oregon	government	list	12
List of U.S. communities with Hispanic majority populations § Oregon	culture	list	9
List of U.S. county secession proposals § Oregon	politics	context	3
List of Oregon Wildernesses	natural	list	47
List of WB affiliates § Oregon	media	list	3
List of Willamette University alumni	biographical	context	112
List of youth orchestras in the United States § Oregon	culture	list	2
List of zoos § Oregon	institutions	list	8
Dirt track racing in the United States § Oregon	sports	context	4
Music of Oregon	culture	context	47
National Register of Historic Places listings in Oregon	culture	context	202
National Register of Historic Places listings in Clackamas County, Oregon	culture	context	78
National Register of Historic Places listings in Columbia County, Oregon	culture	context	10
National Register of Historic Places listings in Hood River County, Oregon	culture	context	38
National Register of Historic Places listings in Jackson County, Oregon	culture	context	149
National Register of Historic Places listings in Lane County, Oregon	culture	context	130
National Register of Historic Places listings in Marion County, Oregon	culture	context	105
National Register of Historic Places listings in Multnomah County, Oregon	culture	context	33
National Register of Historic Places listings in Wasco County, Oregon	culture	context	33
National Register of Historic Places listings in Washington County, Oregon	culture	context	42
National Register of Historic Places listings in North Portland, Oregon	culture	context	26
National Register of Historic Places listings in Northeast Portland, Oregon	culture	context	74
National Register of Historic Places listings in Northwest Portland, Oregon	culture	context	124
National Register of Historic Places listings in Southeast Portland, Oregon	culture	context	94
National Register of Historic Places listings in Southwest Portland, Oregon	culture	context	203
Oregon Attorney General	government	context	15
Oregon Bureau of Labor and Industries	government	context	8
Oregon census statistical areas	geography	list	40
Oregon's congressional districts	government	context	5
Oregon locations by per capita income	geography	list	344
Oregon's Most Endangered Places	history	context	29
Oregon State Treasurer	government	context	22
Oregon Supreme Court	law	context	41
Oregon Women of Achievement	biographical	context	77
Oregon World War II Army Airfields	government	context	7
Production history of the Oregon Shakespeare Festival	culture	context	462
Regions of the United States § Oregon	geography	list	9
State highways in Oregon	transportation	list	169
Steamboats of the Oregon Coast	transportation	context	35
Timeline of Portland, Oregon history	history	list	140
List of tourist attractions in Portland, Oregon	culture	context	27
Tourism in Portland, Oregon	culture	list	68
Tourist sternwheelers of Oregon	transportation	context	5
Oregon's congressional delegations	government	context	76
List of University of Oregon buildings	institutions	context	110
Unrecognized tribes § Oregon	culture	list	11

== See also ==
- List of Oregon-related topics
