= Daniel O'Leary =

Daniel O'Leary may refer to:

- Daniel O'Leary (chemist), American chemist
- Daniel O'Leary (mobster) "Danny" (died 1928), Philadelphia mobster
- Daniel O'Leary (Irish nationalist politician) (1875–1954), Irish Parliamentary Party MP for West Cork (1916–18)
- Daniel Florence O'Leary (c.1802–1854), Irish-born South American brigadier general
- Daniel O'Leary (Fine Gael politician) (1877–1951), Irish Cumann na nGaedhael / Fine Gael politician from Cork
- Dan O'Leary (American football) (born 1977), American football player
- Dan O'Leary, baseball player
- K. Daniel O'Leary (born 1940), American psychologist
