= List of botanical gardens and arboretums in Oregon =

This list of botanical gardens and arboretums in Oregon is intended to include all significant botanical gardens and arboretums in the U.S. state of Oregon.

Name	Image	Affiliation	City	Coordinates
Ainsworth Linear Arboretum		Concordia Tree Team	Portland	45°33′58.7″N 122°38′40.7″W
Beekman Native Plant Arboretum			Jacksonville	42°18′45″N 122°57′50″W
Berry Botanic Garden (closed)			Portland	45°26′32.57″N 122°39′42.84″W
Bush's Pasture Park			Salem	44°55′54″N 123°2′17″W
Concordia Learning Landscape Arboretum		Concordia Tree Team	Portland	45°33′32.4″N 122°37′21.7″W
Crystal Springs Rhododendron Garden		Portland Parks & Recreation	Portland	45°28′47″N 122°38′8″W
Elk Rock Gardens of the Bishop's Close		Episcopal Diocese of Oregon	Dunthorpe	45°26′23.17″N 122°39′5.13″W
Claire Hanley Arboretum			Medford	42°19′49.76″N 122°56′19.86″W
Hoyt Arboretum		Portland Parks & Recreation	Portland	45°31′0.44″N 122°42′57.6″W
Delbert Hunter Arboretum and Botanical Garden			Dallas	44°55′27.5″N 123°19′30.9″W
International Rose Test Garden		Portland Parks & Recreation	Portland	45°31′8.76″N 122°42′19.44″W
Lan Su Chinese Garden			Portland	45°31′32.34″N 122°40′22.76″W
Leach Botanical Garden		Portland Parks & Recreation	Portland	45°28′26.65″N 122°32′2.62″W
Lithia Park			Ashland	42°11′24.1″N 122°43′1.1″W
Mount Pisgah Arboretum			Eugene	44°0′29.99″N 122°58′50.02″W
Oregon Garden			Silverton	44°59′42.67″N 122°47′32.83″W
Oregon Trail Arboretum			Echo	45°44′27″N 119°11′12″W
Palmerton Arboretum			Rogue River	42°26′24.14″N 123°10′22.8″W
Peavy Arboretum		Oregon State University	Corvallis	44°39′24″N 123°13′56″W
Portland Japanese Garden		Portland Parks & Recreation	Portland	45°31′7.39″N 122°42′28.8″W
Rogerson Clematis Garden			Lake Oswego	45°23′34.16″N 122°41′13.32″W
Shore Acres State Park		Oregon Parks & Rec	Coos Bay	43°19′25″N 124°22′55″W
Martha Springer Botanical Garden		Willamette University	Salem	44°56′7.24″N 123°1′46.58″W
Western Deer Park and Arboretum			Sheridan	45°05′42″N 123°22′48″W

== See also ==
- List of botanical gardens and arboretums in the United States
