= List of Linfield University people =

This is a table of notable people affiliated with Linfield University, formerly Linfield College, McMinnville College, and Baptist College at McMinnville. Some noted people are also listed in the main college article. Individuals are sorted by affiliation and alphabetized.

== Alumni and former students ==
=== Art and entertainment ===
- Reid Blackburn, photographer killed in the 1980 eruption of Mount St. Helens in Washington
- Aparna Brielle, actress
- Laura Gibson, musician
- Homer Groening, Canadian-American filmmaker, advertiser, writer, and cartoonist; father of Matt Groening and inspired the name of Homer Simpson
- Abigail Heringer, contestant on the 25th season of The Bachelor and Bachelor in Paradise; the first hearing-impaired contestant on the show
- Shane McRae, poet; received the Whiting Award in 2011; current poetry editor of Image
- Patrick Nickell, sculptor and visual artist
- Amy Tan, author of The Joy Luck Club, The Bonesetter's Daughter, and The Kitchen God's Wife

=== Politics ===
- Joe Medicine Crow, Crow historian, last surviving Plains Indian war chief, and WWII veteran who received the Presidential Medal of Freedom
- Jan L. Lee, politician who served in the Oregon House of Representatives 2001–2003
- Grant Sawyer, 21st governor of Nevada (1959–1967)

=== Sports ===
- Roger Baker, member of the U.S. Olympic handball team in 1972 and 1976
- Scott David Brosius, former Major League Baseball third baseman for the Oakland Athletics (1991–1997) and New York Yankees (1998–2001); 1998 World Series MVP
- Paul Dombroski, former National Football League defensive back; one of the few people of Okinawan descent to play in the NFL
- Mark Few, basketball coach at Gonzaga University, assistant 1989–1999 and head coach since 1999; attended Linfield before transferring to the University of Oregon, where he eventually earned his degree
- Craig Howard, head football coach of Southern Oregon University (2011–2016); led SOU to school's first NAIA National Championship; inducted into the SOU Sports Hall of Fame in 2024
- Randy Mueller, former general manager for the Miami Dolphins and New Orleans Saints, with over two decades of NFL front office experience; former sports analyst for ESPN
- Ad Rutschman, head football coach, baseball coach (1971–1983), and athletic director (1973–1996) of Linfield College; the only college coach at any level to have won national titles in both football and baseball; current kick-off return coach for the Linfield football team
- Sharon Shepherd, shot put and discus thrower who served as an alternate for the U.S. track and field team in the 1960 Rome and 1964 Tokyo Olympic Games
- Fred von Appen, retired football coach known for his head coaching stint with the University of Hawaii at Mānoa 1996–1998; served as an assistant coach on a number of NFL and college coaching staffs

=== Business and law ===
- Augustus C. Kinney, longtime physician in Astoria, Oregon, and noted expert on tuberculosis at the turn of the 20th century
- Thomas Allen McBride, 20th chief justice of the Oregon Supreme Court, serving three times as chief between 1913 and 1927; overall, served on Oregon's highest court from 1909 until his death in 1930
- William Marion Ramsey, 43rd associate justice of the Oregon Supreme Court 1913–1915; first dean of Willamette University College of Law; mayor of Salem, Oregon, and McMinnville, Oregon

=== Medicine and science ===
- Jessica (Saling) Gill, leading researcher on traumatic brain injuries and professor at Johns Hopkins School of Medicine; elected to the National Academy of Medicine in October 2021
- Jerilynn Prior, endocrinologist and leader in understanding and treating perimenopause and menopause

=== Science and technology ===
- Jane Claire Dirks-Edmunds, ecologist, biologist, and author of Not Just Trees; studied the Saddleback Mountain research site 1935–1969
- Donald Firesmith, software engineer, consultant, and trainer at the Software Engineering Institute
- Landon Curt Noll, computer scientist, co-discoverer of the 25th Mersenne prime and discoverer of the 26th
- Marian Pettibone, curator at the Smithsonian's National Museum of Natural History invertebrate zoology department 1963–1978; has 33 species and 3 genera named after her
- Raemer Schreiber, experimental physicist who worked on the Manhattan Project and helped develop the atom and hydrogen bombs

=== Education ===
- Raymond Culver, fourth president of Shimer College
- Peter Ellefson, trombonist and professor of music at Indiana University Bloomington
- Lorie A. Fridell, criminologist known for her research on police and racial profiling and associate professor at the University of South Florida
- Susan Hyde, professor of political science at the University of California, Berkeley
- Shanto Iyengar, professor of political science at Stanford University
- Kenneth Scott Latourette, professor emeritus at Yale University and eminent scholar of Christianity and Chinese history
- Daniel O'Leary, organic chemist at Pomona College
- Rob Saxton, educational administrator; served 2012–2015 as Oregon's first executive deputy superintendent of public instruction, the chief administrator of the Oregon Department of Education
- Muneo Yoshikawa, Japanese professor, author, researcher and consultant known for intercultural communication work, including the double-swing model

== Faculty ==
=== Current ===
- Steve Simmons, soccer coach, MLS professional match evaluator and MLS grassroots instructor
- Joseph Smith, football coach and former player

=== Former ===
- John Wesley Johnson, professor at McMinnville 1863–1867; later president of the University of Oregon
- Curtis P. Coe, professor at McMinnville and Dean of commerce department 1908–1920

== Other notable people ==
- Edith Green, U.S. representative; served 10 terms 1955–1974; authored Title IX; served on the Linfield College Board of Trustees and received an honorary degree in 1964
- Albin Walter Norblad Jr., served in the Oregon Legislative Assembly as a representative for one term (1935–1937); member of the board of trustees of Linfield College
- Fred Rogers, better known as Mister Rogers, television host; received an honorary degree in 1982

== College and university presidents (1857–present) ==
=== Presidents of McMinnville College ===
- 1857–1860: George C. Chandler (Note: Oregon became a state on February 14, 1859. Thus, at the start of Chandler's presidency, the college was located in the Oregon Territory. At the end of his presidency, it was located in the State of Oregon. Same location, different name.)
- 1864–1867: John W. Johnson
- 1873: J. D. Robb (Note: Robb served February 20, 1873–July 10, 1873, according to the 1938 book Bricks Without Straw: The Story of Linfield College, by Jonas A. Jonasson.)
- 1873–1876: Mark Bailey
- 1876–1877: John E. Magers
- 1877–1878: Ep Roberts
- 1878–1881: J. G. Burchett
- 1881–1887: E.C. Anderson
- 1887–1896: Truman G. Brownson
- 1896–1903: Harry L. Boardman
- 1903–1905: A. M. Brumback
- 1905–1906: Emanuel Northup, interim
- 1906–1931: Leonard W. Riley (name changed to Linfield in 1922)

=== Presidents of Linfield College ===
- 1931–1932: William R. Frerichs, interim
- 1932–1938: Elam J. Anderson
- 1938–1943: William G. Everson
- 1943–1968: Harry L. Dillin
- 1968, 1974: Winthrop W. Dolan, interim
- 1968–1974: Gordon C. Bjork
- 1974–1975: Cornelius Siemens, interim
- 1975–1992: Charles U. Walker
- 1992–2005: Vivian A. Bull
- 2005–2006: Marvin Henberg, interim
- 2006–2018: Thomas L. Hellie
- 2018–2020: Miles K. Davis (college changed to university in 2020)

=== Presidents of Linfield University ===
- 2020–2023: Miles K. Davis
- 2024–2025: Rebecca "Becky" Johnson, interim
- 2025–present: Mark Blegen
