= List of mayors of places in Oregon =

This is a list of mayors of the 25 largest cities in Oregon.

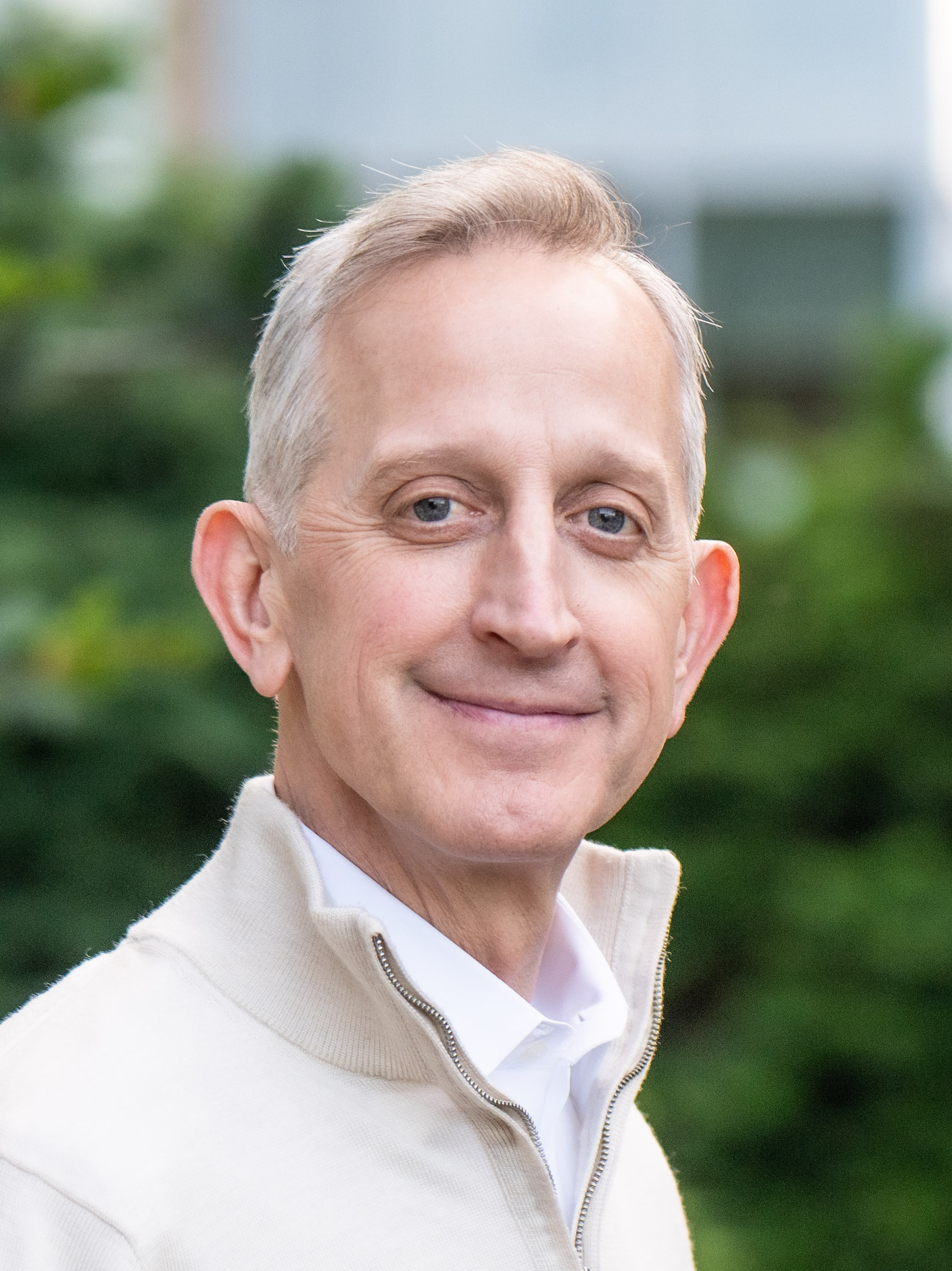
Keith Wilson, mayor of Portland

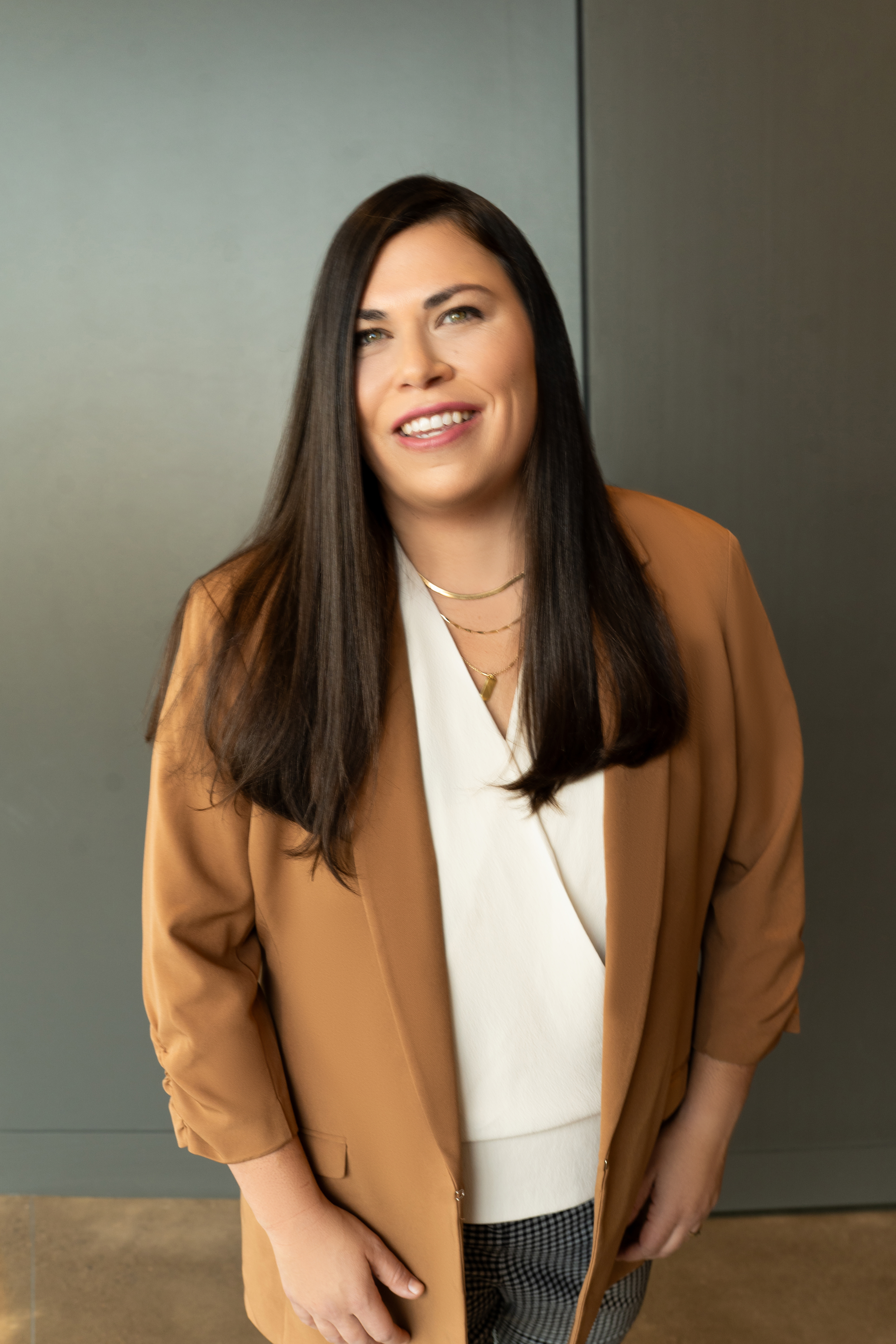
Lacey Beaty, mayor of Beaverton

Rank	City	Mayor	Serving since	Notes
1	Portland	Keith Wilson	January 1, 2025	
2	Salem	Julie Hoy	January 13, 2025	
3	Eugene	Kaarin Knudson	January 6, 2025	
4	Gresham	Travis Stovall	January 2021	
5	Hillsboro	Beach Pace	January 7, 2025	
6	Beaverton	Lacey Beaty	January 2021	
7	Bend	Melanie Kebler	November 2020	
8	Medford	Michael Zarosinski	January 9, 2026	
9	Springfield	Sean VanGordon	January 2021	
10	Corvallis	Charles Maughan	January 2023	
11	Albany	Alex Johnson II	January 1, 2021	
12	Tigard	Yi-Kang Hu	October 14th, 2025	
13	Lake Oswego	Joe Buck	January 1, 2021	
14	Keizer	Cathy Clark	January 2015	
15	Grants Pass	Clint Scherf	January 6, 2025	
16	Oregon City	Denyse McGriff	January 1, 2023	
17	McMinnville	Kim Morris	January 2025	
18	Redmond	Ed Fitch	January 2026	
19	Tualatin	Frank Bubenik	January, 2019	
20	West Linn	Rory Bialostosky	June 20, 2023	
21	Woodburn	Frank Lonergan	December 12, 2022	
22	Newberg	Bill Rosacker	January 17, 2023	
23	Forest Grove	Malynda Wenzl	January 2011	
24	Roseburg	Larry Rich	January 1, 1999	
25	Wilsonville	Shawn O'Neil	January 2025	

== See also ==
- List of mayors of Bend, Oregon
- List of mayors of Eugene, Oregon
- List of mayors of Hillsboro, Oregon
- List of mayors of Milwaukie, Oregon
- List of mayors of Portland, Oregon
