= Elk Rock Garden =

Park in Oregon, United States

- Elk Rock Gardens of the Bishop's Close
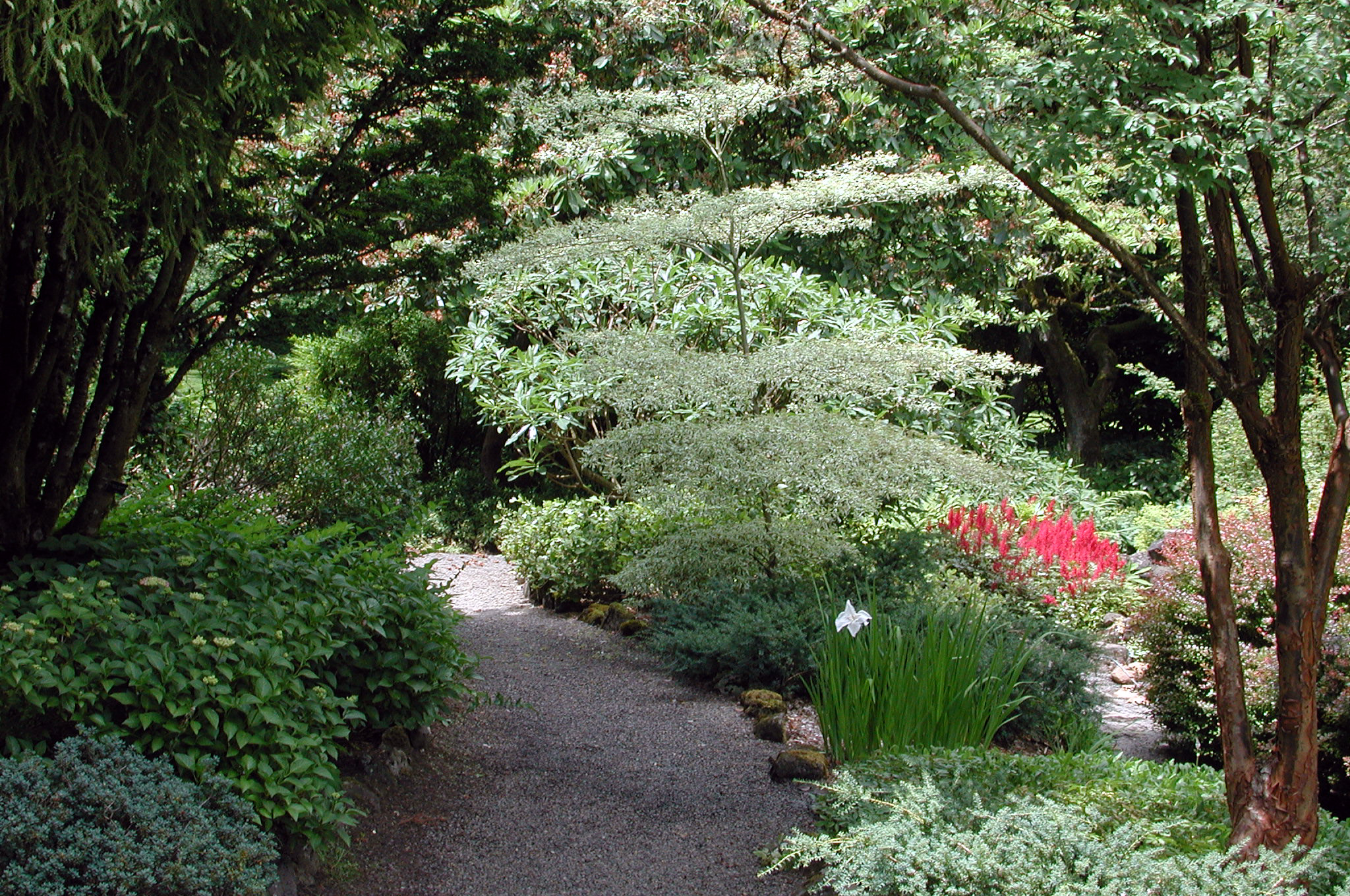
- Path through the Cascades section of the gardens
- Interactive map of Elk Rock Garden
- Location: Dunthorpe, Oregon, U.S.
- Coordinates: 45°26′23.17″N 122°39′5.13″W
- Area: 13 acres (5.3 ha)
- Opened: 1916
- Owner: Elk Rock Garden Foundation
- Status: Open to the public
- Website: elkrockgarden.org

Elk Rock Garden, formerly Elk Rock Gardens of the Bishop's Close, is a historic 13-acre (5.3 ha) hillside estate garden in Dunthorpe, Oregon, just south of Portland, perched on cliffs above the Willamette River. Peter Kerr started the gardens in 1916 on an estate that passed to the Episcopal Diocese of Oregon after his death in 1957. In 2023, the estate was acquired by the non-profit Elk Rock Garden Foundation. The garden was added to the National Register of Historic Places in 2026.

The private estate includes a manor house-inspired residence and other structures, and is open to visitors Monday–Friday, 8:00am – 5:00pm. Magnolias and other native and non-native trees, shrubs, and plants grow in the gardens. Dunthorpe is an unincorporated community on the west side of the Willamette south of Portland and north of Lake Oswego along Oregon Route 43.

== History ==
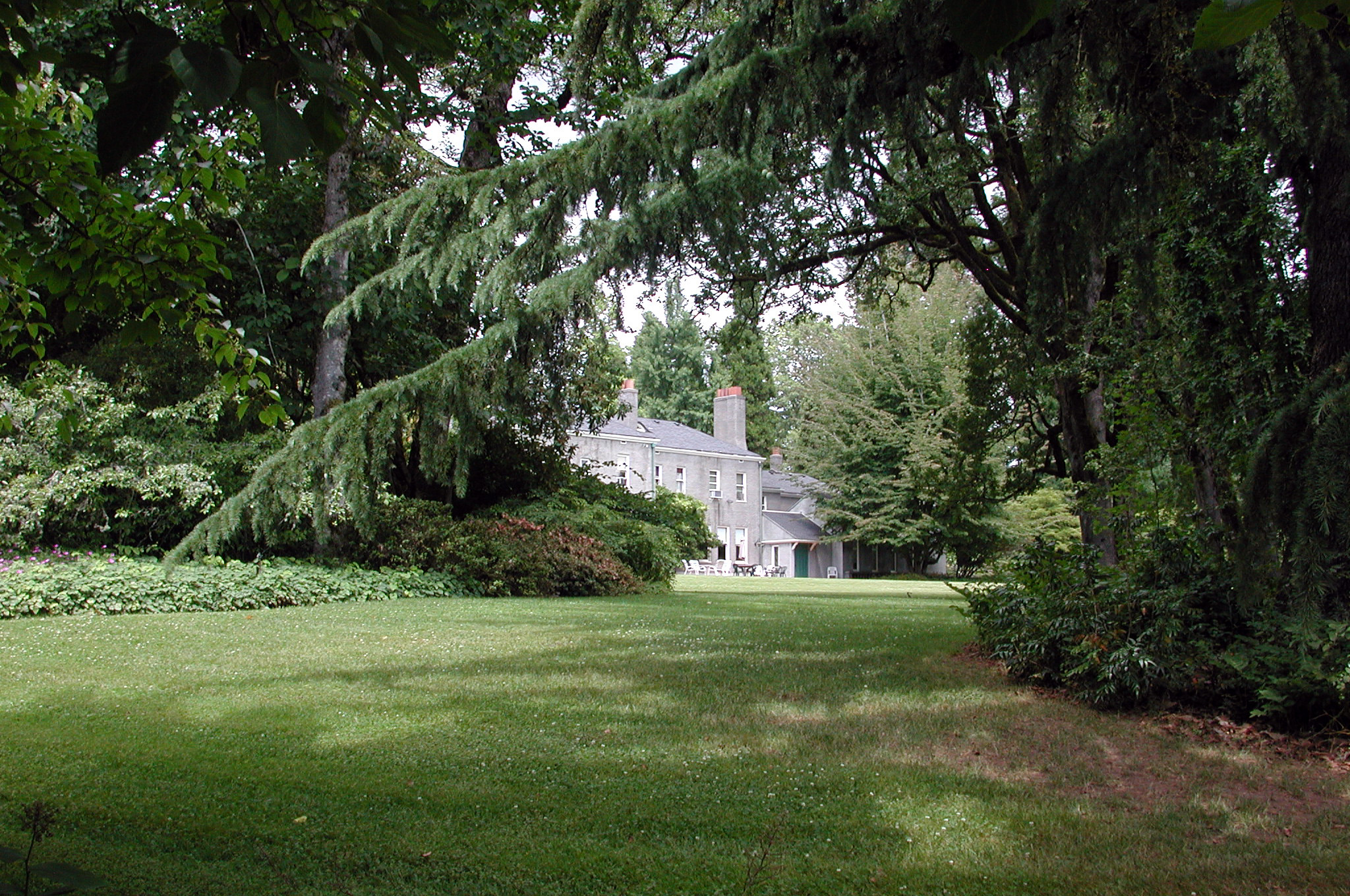
The manor from the southeast

Kerr moved to Portland from Scotland in 1888 and started a grain business. He and his brother and Kerr's business partner bought land on the hillside in the early 1890s. They built a cottage on the site and lived there until the other two men married and moved elsewhere. Kerr, the sole remaining occupant, married Laurie King in 1905. They lived in the cottage until 1916, when a new house resembling a Scottish manor was completed on the site. John Olmsted of the Olmsted Brothers landscape architects, sited the house to provide a view of Mount Hood. After the manor was finished, Kerr, encouraged by his wife, began work on a large garden. Kerr planted the garden with plants obtained during his travels, as well as native Northwest plants. He spent nearly six decades developing the garden prior to his death at the age of 95.

When Kerr died in 1957, his daughters, Anne McDonald and Jane Platt, gave the estate and an endowment for its maintenance to the Episcopal Bishop of Oregon on condition that the garden be open to visitors. The diocese named the gardens "Elk Rock Gardens of the Bishop's Close". The "Elk Rock" part of the name derived from the late 19th century name for nearby cliffs above the river. The "Close" part of the name derived from a mainly British use of the word meaning "an enclosed area around a church or other sacred space". The Elk Rock Garden Foundation and the Friends of Elk Rock Garden were formed in 1994 to protect and maintain the garden.

In 2022, the Episcopal Diocese of Oregon decided to sell the estate, which was ultimately purchased by the Elk Rock Garden Foundation in 2023.

On nearby land to the south, the City of Portland manages about 3.3 acres (1.3 ha) donated by the Kerr family in 1955 for a public park. The Peter Kerr Property, as it is called, includes natural habitat and part of a 1,200-foot (370 m) railroad tunnel through Elk Rock. The Willamette Shore Trolley uses the tunnel for passenger excursions between Portland and Lake Oswego. Across the river from the estate and park is Elk Rock Island, which is accessible from Spring Park in Milwaukie on the east side of the river.

== See also ==
- List of botanical gardens and arboretums in Oregon
