= List of political parties in Oregon =

Party registration by county (October 2018): Democrat >= 30% Democrat >= 40% Democrat >= 50% Republican >= 30% Republican >= 40% Republican >= 50% Unaffiliated—<30%

This is a list of political parties in the U.S. state of Oregon.

== Statewide parties ==
The following is a list of political parties officially recognized by the Oregon State Elections Division as statewide parties as of August 2026 (alphabetical, by title in official record).

- Democratic Party (see also Democratic Party (United States))
- Independent Party of Oregon
- Libertarian Party (see also Libertarian Party (United States))
- No Labels Party
- Pacific Green Party (see also Green Party (United States))
- Progressive Party (Known as the "Oregon Peace Party" until September 18, 2009)
- Republican Party (see also Republican Party (United States))
- Working Families Party

== Less than statewide parties ==
The following are recognized as parties, but not certified to nominate for statewide office.

- Socialist Party (Congressional District 3, has not fielded a candidate since 2004)

== Local and non-recognized parties ==
- Oregon Patriot Party
- Freedom Socialist Party
- Socialist Alternative
- Constitution Party (see also Constitution Party (United States))

== Major and minor party growth ==
Major Party Growth Comparison

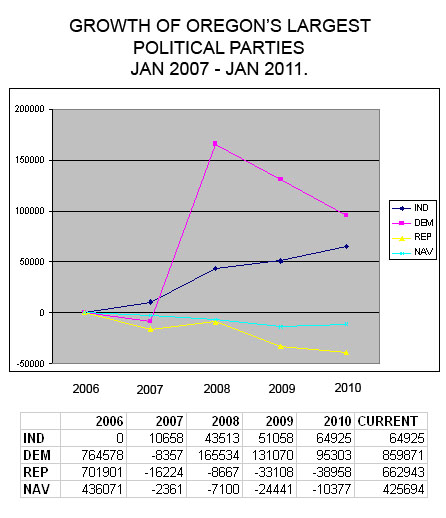
IPO major party comparison

Minor Party Growth Comparison

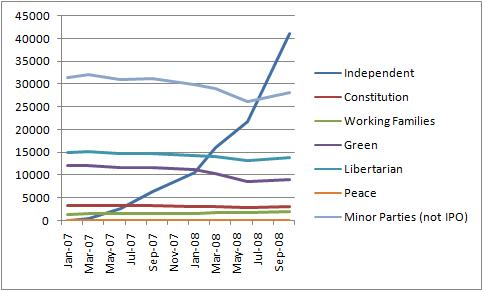
IPO minor party comparison

== See also ==
- Politics of Oregon
- Oregon statewide elections, 2006
- Lists of political parties
- Lists of Oregon-related topics
