= Rogerson Clematis Garden =

Botanical garden near Lake Oswego, Oregon, United States

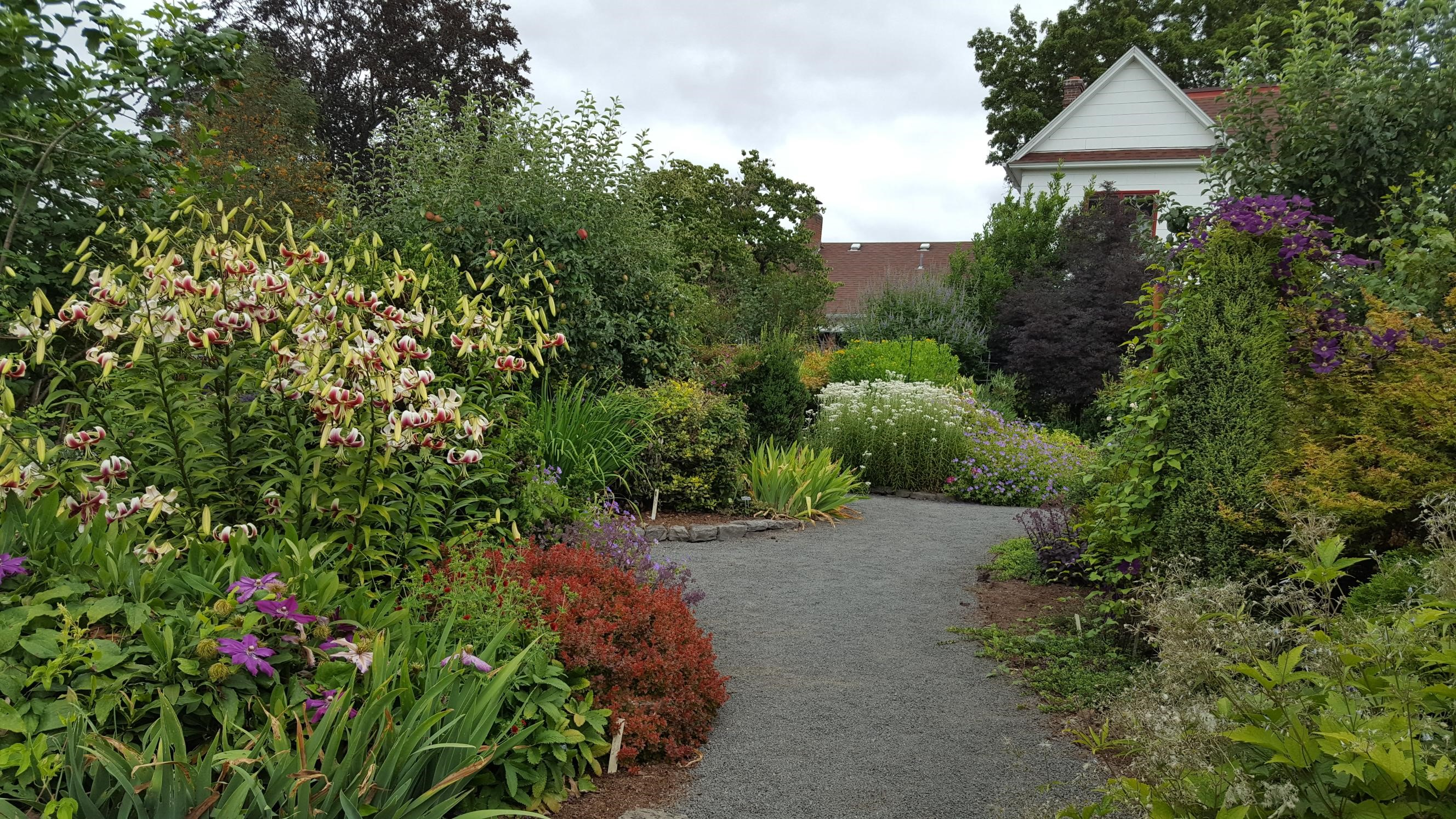
- Display gardens

- Location within Oregon
- Type: Botanical garden
- Location: Lake Oswego, Oregon, United States
- Coordinates: 45°23′34.16″N 122°41′13.32″W
- Area: 1-acre (0.40 ha)
- Established: 1971, 2005
- Founder: Brewster Rogerson
- Operator: Friends of the Rogerson Clematis Collection
- Open: Daily, dawn to dusk
- Collections: Clematis
- Website: Official website

The Rogerson Clematis Garden is a botanical garden located at Luscher Farm Park near Lake Oswego, Oregon. The garden is roughly 1-acre (0.40 ha) in size and is home to the Rogerson Clematis Collection, a Nationally Accredited Plant Collection consisting of more than 2,000 individual clematis plants. The collection represents nearly 900 distinct species or cultivars from around the world, including rare and historic hybrids, American species, and recent introductions.

== History ==
=== Brewster Rogerson ===
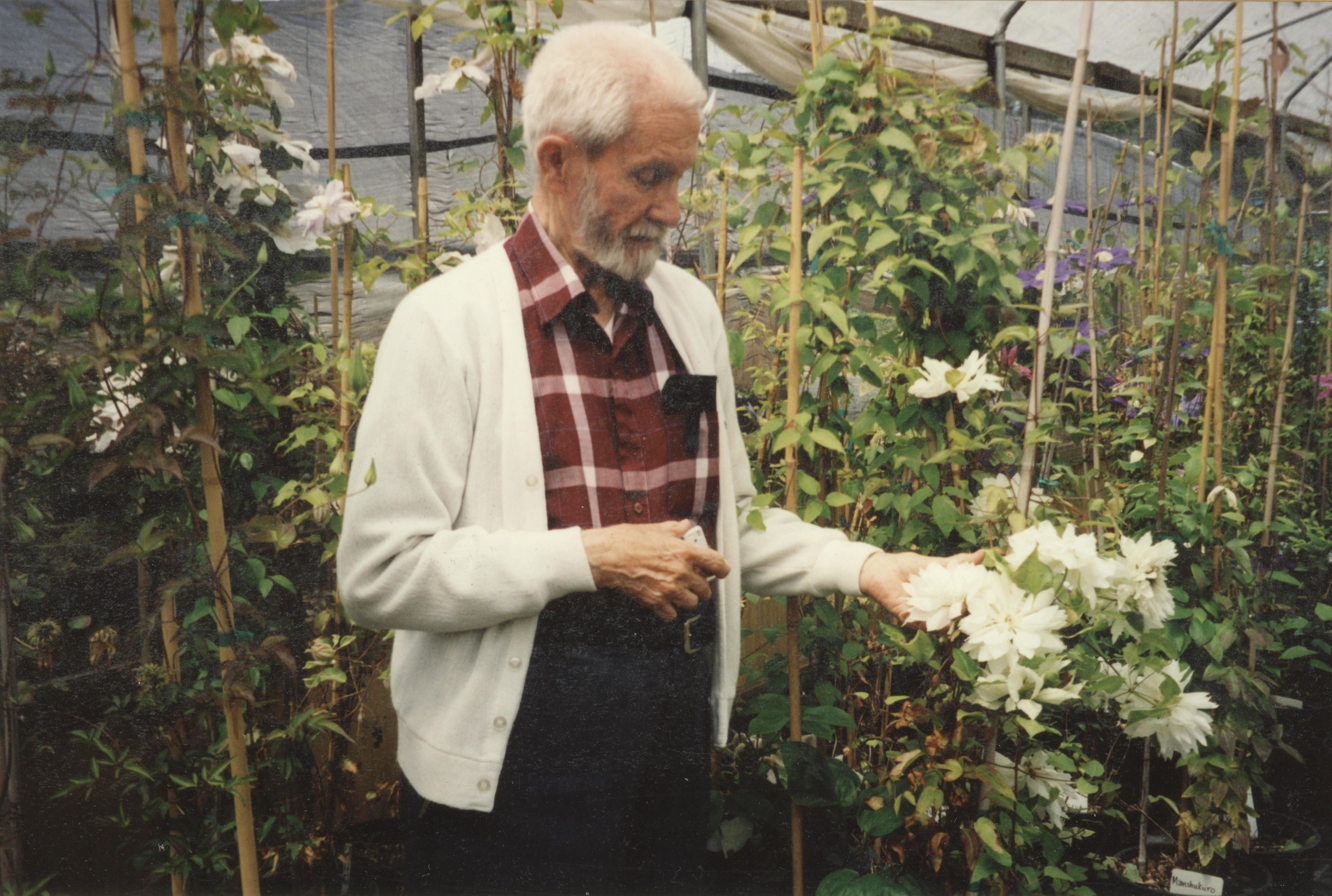
Brewster Rogerson, 2001

In 1971 Brewster Rogerson, a professor of English Literature at Kansas State University, purchased four clematis plants to landscape a new home, and by 1975 was a serious collector. He retired from teaching in 1981, and moved his collection of 100 plants to the milder climate of Eugene, Oregon. In 1986, Rogerson again moved his collection, now 260 plants, to a large greenhouse at Gutmann's Nurseries near Portland, Oregon.

In 1984, Rogerson became a founding member of the International Clematis Society (IClS) and served as vice-president. He was named an Honorary Fellow in 2002. Rogerson authored 100 Clematis of the Month articles for the Society's website. The IClS held their international conference in Portland in 2001, 2010, and 2019 to visit the collection.

Rogerson introduced numerous clematis species and varieties to North American gardeners through his extensive contacts with growers, breeders, and plant explorers throughout the world. By the time of his death in May 2015 at age 94, he had been collecting clematis for 44 years and was a respected author and lecturer on the genus.

=== Friends of the Rogerson Clematis Collection ===
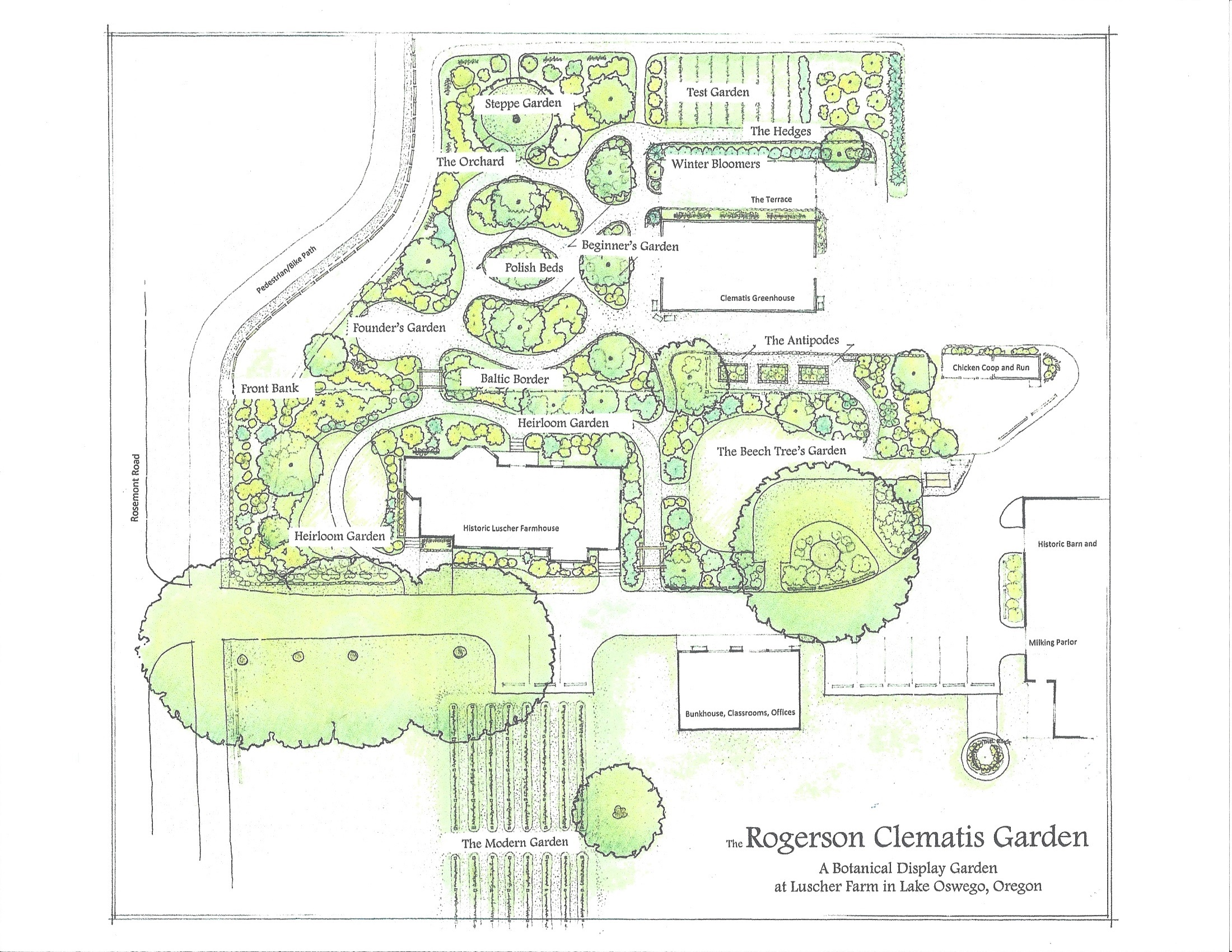
Map of the Rogerson Clematis Garden

The Friends of the Rogerson Clematis Collection (FRCC), a 501(c)(3) organization, was formed to preserve and find a permanent home for the collection after it outgrew its space at Gutmann's. In January 2005, the FRCC signed an agreement with the City of Lake Oswego to construct a botanic garden featuring the collection at Luscher Farm, a large city park.

The collection of 900 plants, representing 450 species and cultivars, was moved to a new greenhouse at Luscher Farm in December 2005. Development and planting of the clematis and accompanying plants began in spring 2006. Linda Beutler, the author of two books on clematis and a former president of the International Clematis Society, was hired as the first curator of the collection in 2007. The Garden is managed and maintained organically by FRCC volunteers.

== Accreditation ==
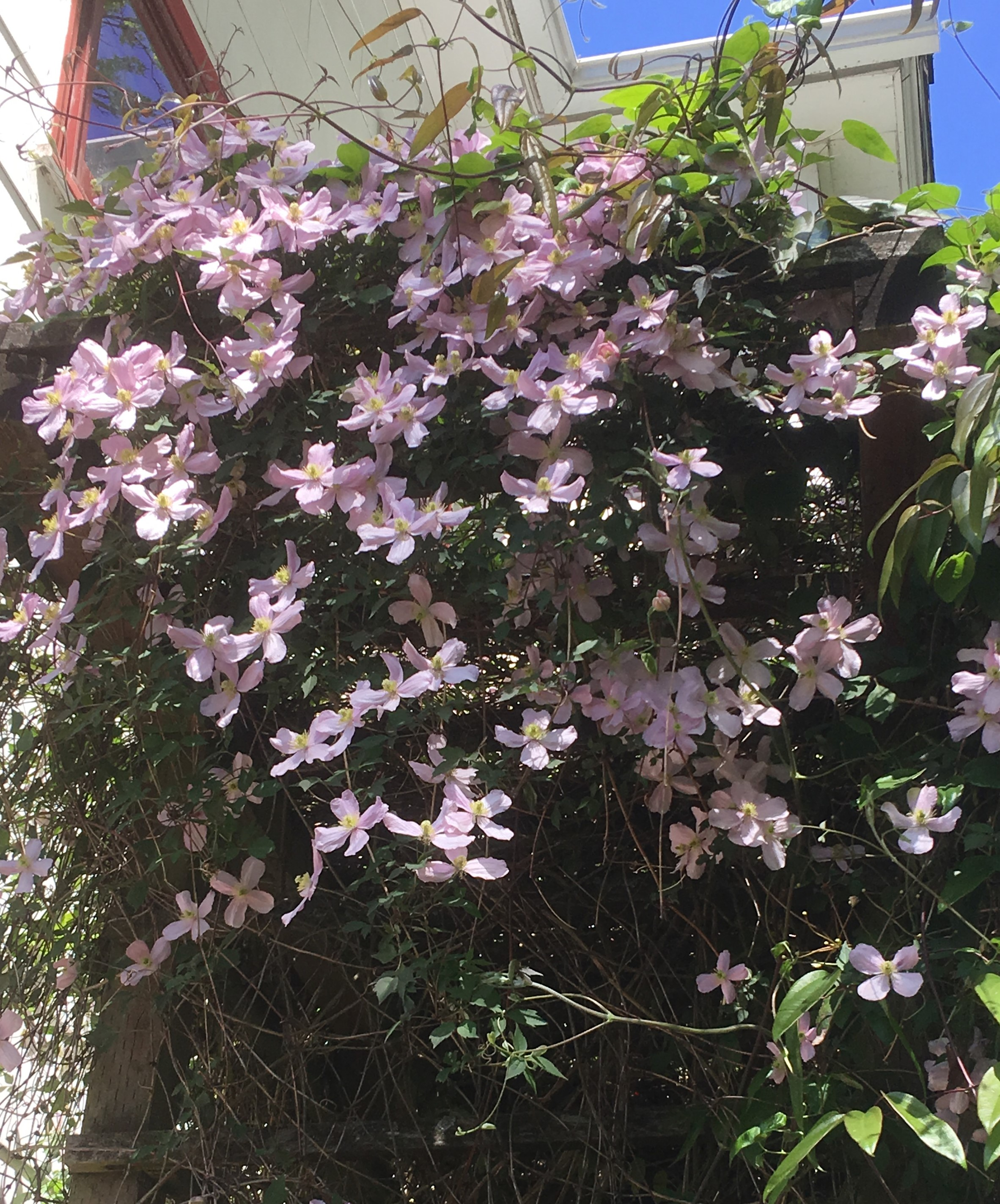
Clematis 'Brewster', a selection of Clematis montana named after Brewster Rogerson.

In 2018, the Rogerson Clematis Collection was awarded full accreditation in the Plant Collections Network, a collaboration of the American Public Gardens Association and the USDA–Agricultural Research Service. It is the only accredited clematis collection in North America and is the most comprehensive and largest collection of clematis in a public park in the U.S.

== Display Gardens ==
There are 15 display gardens in the Garden, each with its own focus. Among them are the Heirloom Garden with antique clematis and other vintage plants from before World War I, and the Modern Garden, where all the clematis varieties are post-World War II. Geographic regions represented include the Baltic Border and the Polish Beds featuring clematis that were developed during the Cold War and unknown to western gardeners until the Iron Curtain fell. The newest garden, The Antipodes, has clematis and other plants from New Zealand, Australia, and Tasmania.

== Events and Visiting ==
The Garden is open every day without charge from dawn until dusk. The FRCC holds classes, special events, docent-led tours and plant sales at the garden.

== See also ==
- List of botanical gardens and arboretums in Oregon
