= Denny Doyle (politician) =

American politician

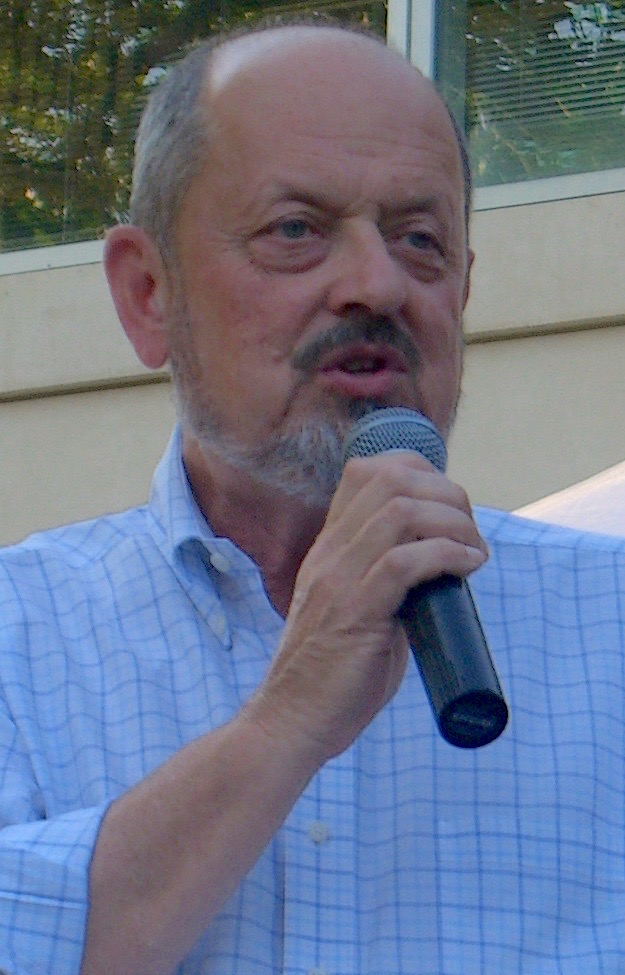
- Doyle at Beaverton City Library (2009)

Mayor of Beaverton, Oregon
- In office January 2009 – January 2021
- Preceded by: Rob Drake
- Succeeded by: Lacey Beaty

Personal details
- Born: September 7, 1948 (age 78) Chicago, Illinois
- Party: Democratic
- Spouse: Ann Doyle
- Children: 2
- Education: Illinois State University (B.A.)
- Profession: Educator

Dennis Doyle (born September 7, 1948) is an American politician and former mayor of Beaverton, Washington County, Oregon, and convicted sex offender. Doyle served as a Beaverton city councilor for 14 years before being elected mayor of the city in 2008, succeeding Rob Drake in January 2009.

== Early life ==
Born in Chicago in 1948, he earned a Bachelor of Arts in political science from Illinois State University. He is married to Ann Doyle for over 34 years, Doyle has two daughters, both married, as well as four granddaughters. Doyle moved to Beaverton in the 1980s, where he was a certified teacher and sports coach, previously coaching softball and soccer for Valley Catholic High School.

== Political career ==
Doyle, a Democrat who was originally elected in 2008, was reelected in 2012. He ran unopposed for a third term in 2016. In September 2019, he announced that he intended to run for reelection in the May 2020 primary election, for a fourth term. He was involved in many climate change and environmental issues as mayor, and taking part in several environmental organizations. Doyle was defeated by challenger Lacey Beaty in the November 2020 election in a run off. Beaty's term in office began January 1, 2021.

== Legal issues ==
On March 3, 2022, Doyle was charged in federal court with one felony count of possession of child pornography, which carries up to 20 years in prison and/or a fine of up to $250,000. Doyle had the child pornography in his possession between 2014 and 2015, including sexually explicit material depicting minors under the age of 12. The material was discovered on a hard drive in January 2022, prompting the investigation. The hard drive belonged to a girls' youth soccer league of which he was vice president at the time, and consisted of between 300 and 600 pornographic images of children.

Doyle made his initial appearance at Gus J. Solomon United States Courthouse on March 4, 2022. Doyle pleaded guilty to a single charge of possession of child pornography on October 11, 2022. On January 24, 2023, Doyle was sentenced to six months in prison and five years of supervised release. The sentence fell in between the U.S. Attorney's recommended sentence of a year and a day in prison, and his defense lawyer's recommendation of one year of home detention. Judge Michael W. Mosman, presiding over the case, called Doyle's case "extraordinary" as he had apparently not viewed child pornography for several years prior to his arrest, in contrast to most other defendants; Doyle himself said the same, and apologized for his actions, claiming his behavior was "idiotic."

In April 2024, following his release from prison, Doyle was again arrested on a probation violation stemming from 19 unmonitored electronic devices being present in his home without the permission of his probation officer.

Political offices
Preceded by Rob Drake	Mayor of Beaverton, Oregon; January 2009 – December 2020	Succeeded by Lacey Beaty
