= List of arches in Oregon =

List of arches in Oregon contains all natural rock arches identified by the USGS in the U.S. state of Oregon. The USGS defines an arch as a natural arch-like opening in a rock mass (bridge, natural bridge, sea arch).

There are 15 listed as of December 12, 2008.

name	elevation	coordinate	USGS Map	GNIS ID
Sea Lion Rock	0 ft (0 m)		Tillamook Head	1675460
Natural Bridges	36 ft (11 m)		Carpenterville	1159204
Battle Rock Arch	0 ft (0 m)		Port Orford	1675457
Cave Rock Arch	26 ft (7.9 m)		Cape Sebastian	1675458
Cow Horn Arch	4,268 ft (1,301 m)		Butler Butte	1157050
Tex Creek Arch	4,488 ft (1,368 m)		Big Weasel Springs	2123518
Needle Rock	2,175 ft (663 m)		Cascade Gorge	1146753
Natural Bridge	3,205 ft (977 m)		Union Creek	1157045
Devils Punch Bowl	36 ft (11 m)		Newport North	1679040
Phantom Natural Bridge	4,541 ft (1,384 m)		Battle Ax	1147628
Rock Bridge	4,331 ft (1,320 m)		Elkhorn	1679039
Two Arches	0 ft (0 m)		Unknown	1156809
Haystack Rock	0 ft (0 m)		Nestucca Bay	1675459
Twin Rocks Arch	0 ft (0 m)		Garibaldi	1675461
Claron Arch	1,552 ft (473 m)		Clarno	1679038

== See also ==
- Lists of Oregon-related topics
