= Hoyt Arboretum =

Arboretum and park in Portland, Oregon, United States

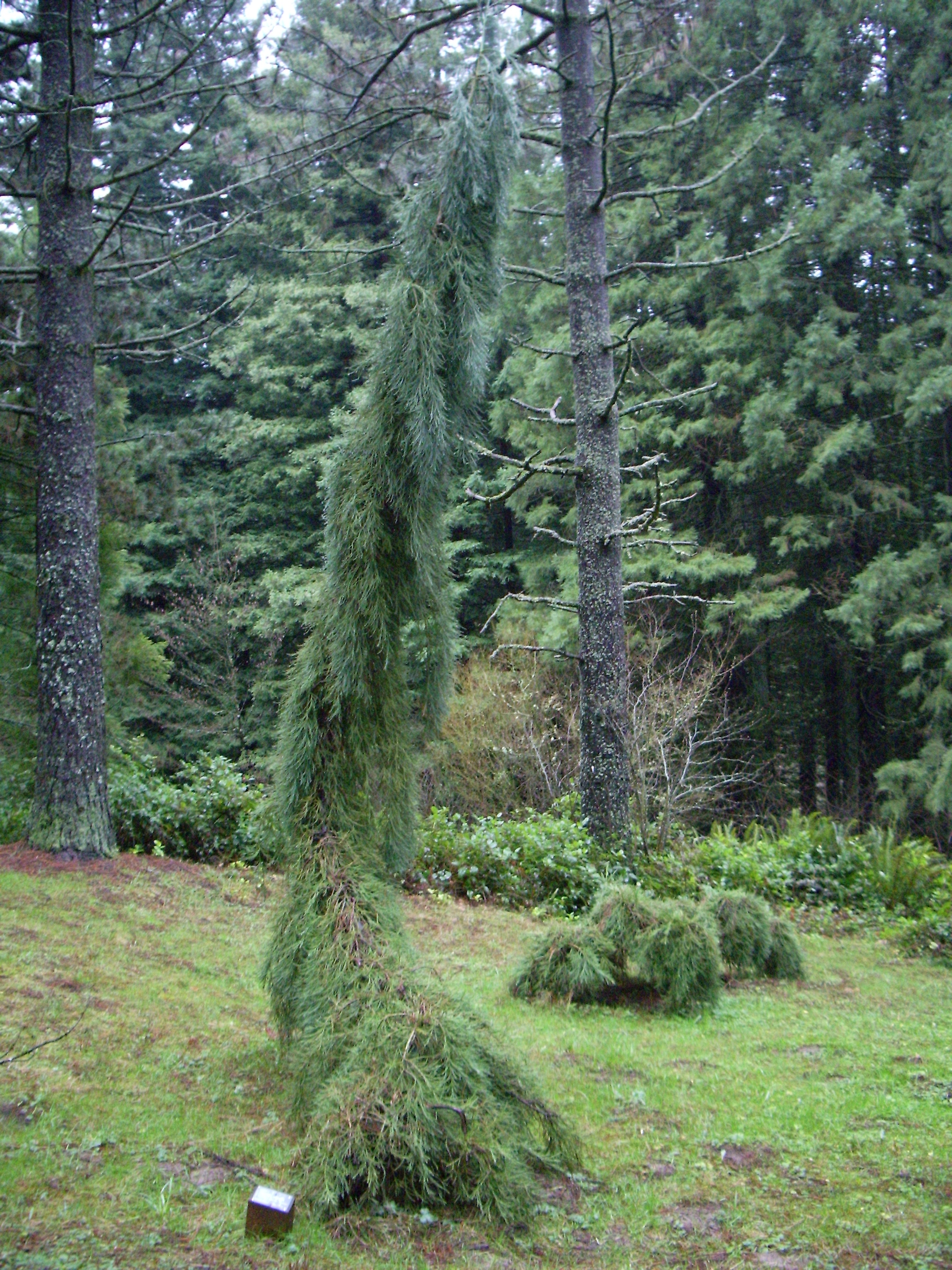
- Weeping sequoia (Sequoiadendron giganteum 'Pendulum') in Hoyt Arboretum

- Location within Portland, Oregon Location within Oregon Location within the United States
- Type: Arboretum
- Location: 4000 SW Fairview Blvd. Portland, Oregon
- Coordinates: 45.51679°N 122.71600°W
- Area: 153.01 acres (61.92 ha)
- Opened: 1922
- Operator: Portland Parks & Recreation
- Visitors: 350,000
- Status: Open to the public
- Website: www.hoytarboretum.org

Hoyt Arboretum is a public park in Portland, Oregon, which is part of the complex of parks collectively known as Washington Park. The 153-acre (62 ha) arboretum is located atop a ridge in the Tualatin Mountains two miles (3.2 km) west of downtown Portland. Hoyt has 12 miles of hiking trails, two miles of accessible paved trails, and is open free to the public all year. About 350,000 visitors per year visit the arboretum.

== History ==
Hoyt Arboretum is sited on steep slopes, straddling the SW Fairview Boulevard ridge above the Oregon Zoo and the Portland Japanese Garden. The elevation of the arboretum ranges from 650 feet to 900 feet, and there are several ravines within the arboretum. The hilly terrain of the arboretum was once in private hands. The United States government had granted land to American pioneers through the Donation Land Claim Act of 1850 for farming and logging, but the homesteads failed; by 1865, the land was owned by Multnomah County. In 1889, the area was ravaged by a forest fire, and part of the burned land was used to build the 160-acre (65-hectare) Multnomah County Poor Farm Hillside Farm west of Washington Park.

After the Poor Farm closed, in 1922 Multnomah County sold the land to the City of Portland, which created Hoyt Arboretum in 1930. The city commissioned John W. Duncan, superintendent of parks for Spokane, Washington, to design a plan for the new arboretum. He completed the plan in 1930, and included locations for nearly forty families of trees planted in a naturalistic landscape. Works Progress Administration crews cleared the forest and built the roads and paths winding through the arboretum in 1930 and 1931, although some native trees that had grown in the wake of the 1889 fire were left in place. The arboretum was planted according to Duncan's plan from 1931 to 1944. Many trees needed to be replaced after the Columbus Day Storm of 1962.

Hoyt Arboretum was founded to conserve endangered species and educate the community. The property has increased in size through additional donations and acquisitions to 153-acre (0.62 km^{2}) (62 ha).

== Gardens and collections ==
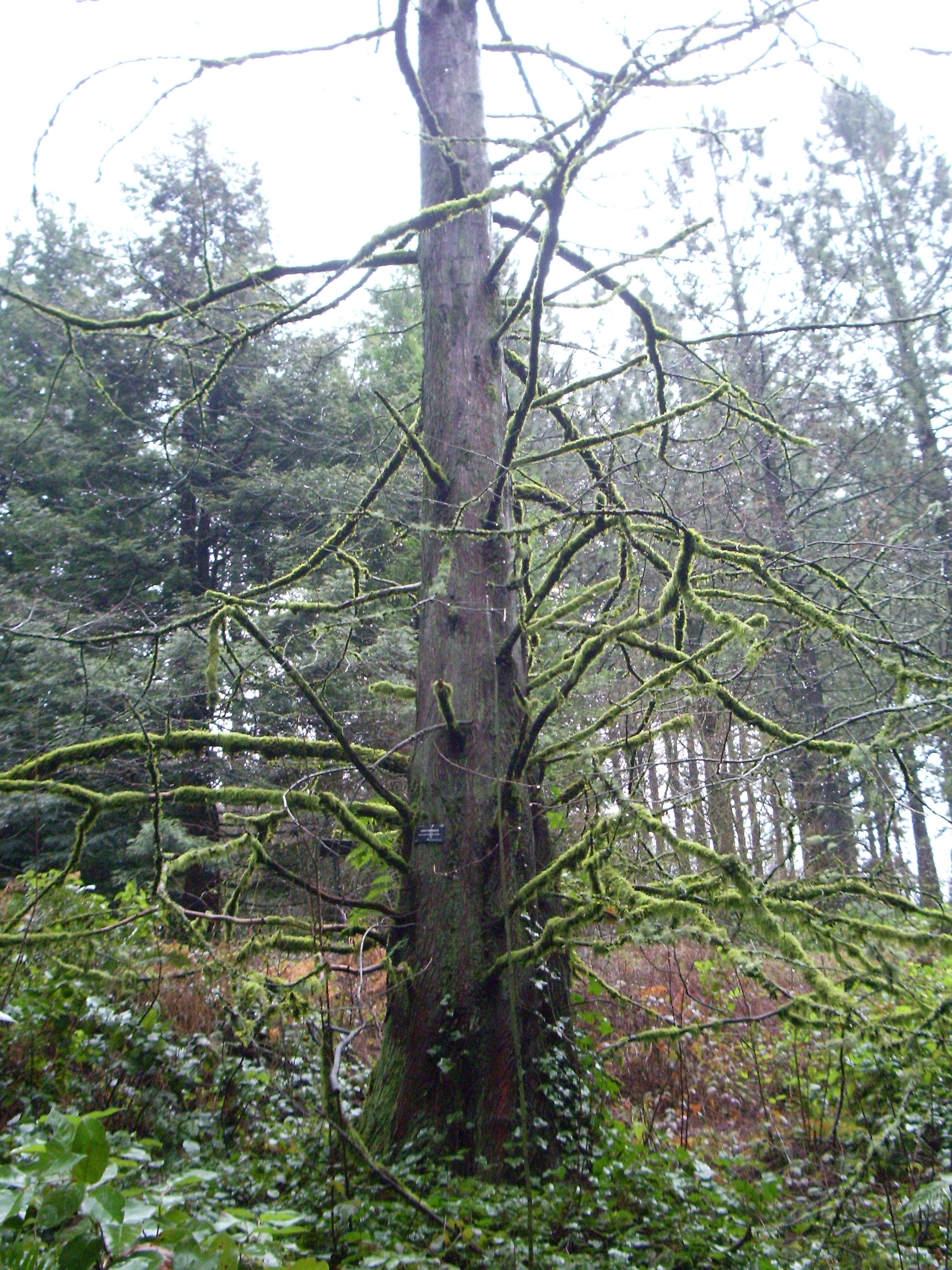
Mature dawn redwood (Metasequoia glyptostroboides) in winter

The arboretum has approximately 6,000 individual trees and shrubs of more than 2,300 species from all around the world, 63 of which are vulnerable or endangered. Most have labels identifying common and scientific names and region of origin.

The arboretum has one of the most extensive conifer collections in the United States. The conifer collection includes a dawn redwood, one of only a few known deciduous conifers (needle and cone bearing trees that lose their leaves in the winter). The species was once thought extinct and known only in fossils, but was rediscovered in a remote valley in Hubei province, China in 1944. The species was reintroduced to the western hemisphere in 1948, with the Hoyt Arboretum as one of the first recipients. In the fall of 1952, the Hoyt arboretum's dawn redwood became the first in the Western Hemisphere to produce cones in about 6 million years.

The arboretum contains a nationally recognized magnolia collection, recognized as an official participating site in the North American Plant Collections Consortium.

Hoyt's winter landscape shows interesting colors, textures and shapes, and winter blooms of hellebores, viburnums, and witch-hazels.

In 2016, the arboretum opened their Bamboo Forest featuring 30 species of bamboo.

== Features ==
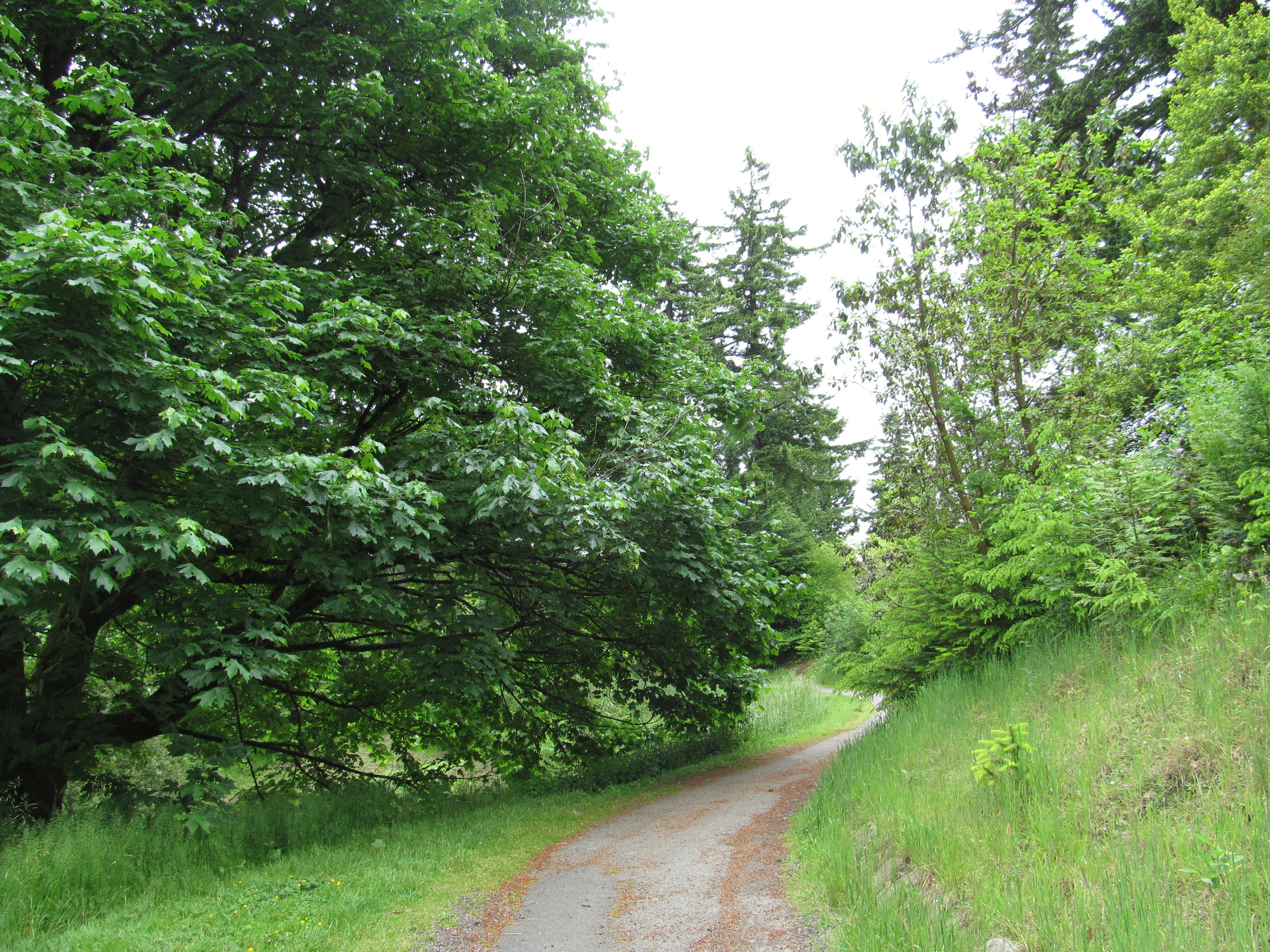
A view of one of the many trails.

The arboretum has twelve miles (19 km) of trails (two miles (3 km) of which are wheelchair accessible), marked with over 250 trail signs and interpretive panels. The Wildwood Trail which leads north to Forest Park and the Marquam Trail which leads south to Marquam Nature Park meet in the arboretum; both trails are segments of the Portland area's 40-Mile Loop trail network.

The visitor center is located at the center of the park and contains a small nature center and research library where visitors can find information about the park and its trees; the visitor center is also the starting point for periodic volunteer-guided tours. The research library has over 800 books ranging from technical floras to beginner gardening books, and is accessible to the public.

The Stevens Pavilion is a covered A-frame picnic shelter with wooden beams and stone floors, nestled in a grove of Douglas-fir trees.

== Public art ==
- House for Summer is a living sculpture of Himalayan birch trees planted by artist Helen Lessick in 1987. The sculpture reflects the shelter of the forest canopy and changes with the seasons. Park arborists maintain the work under a joint agreement with Portland's Regional Arts and Culture Council.
- Basket of Air is a stainless and galvanized steel spherical sculpture by Portland artist Ivan McLean, inspired by bamboo baskets. It is suspended over the pond in the arboretum's bamboo garden and was installed in 2016.

== Gallery ==
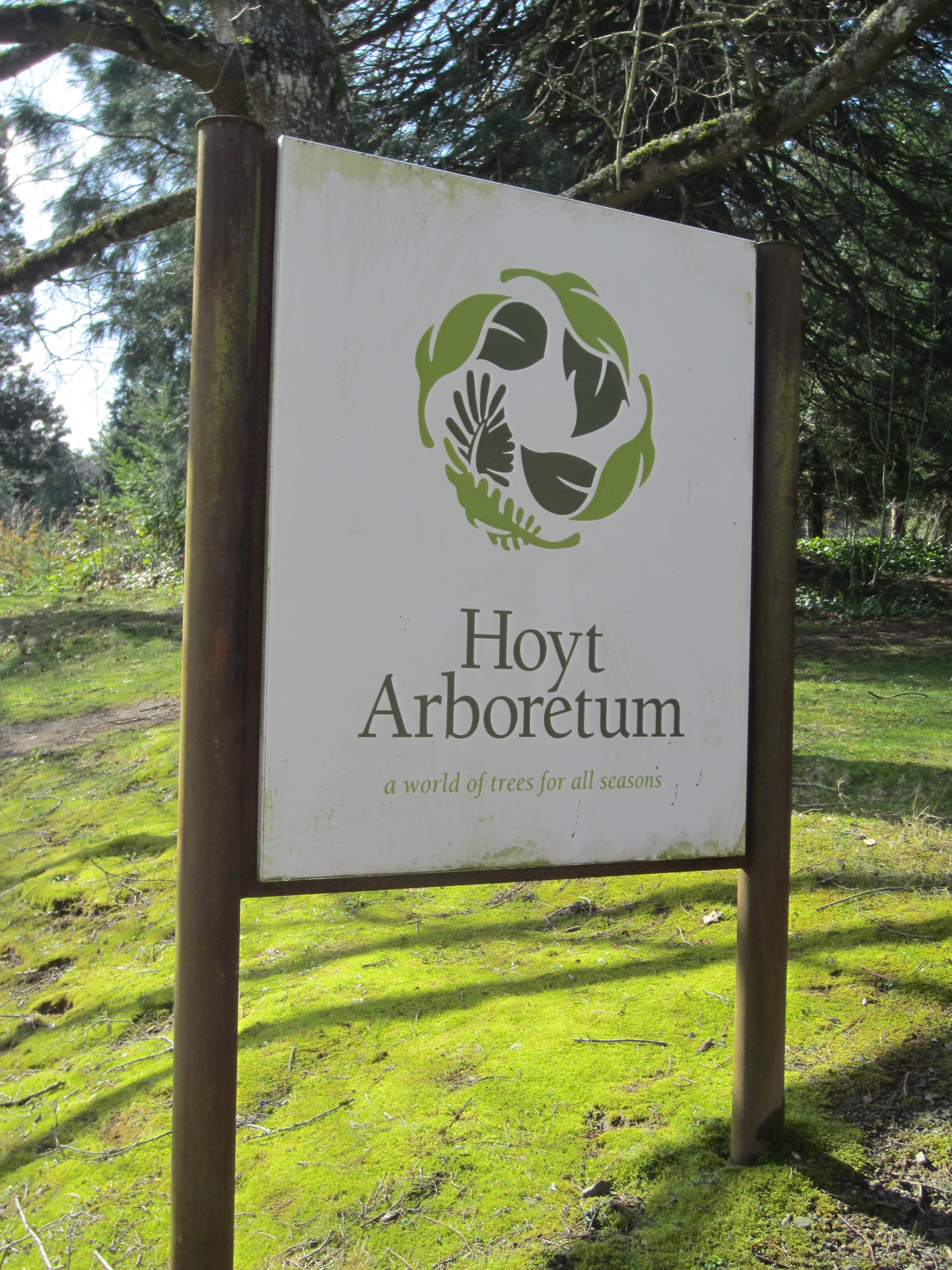
Entrance sign.

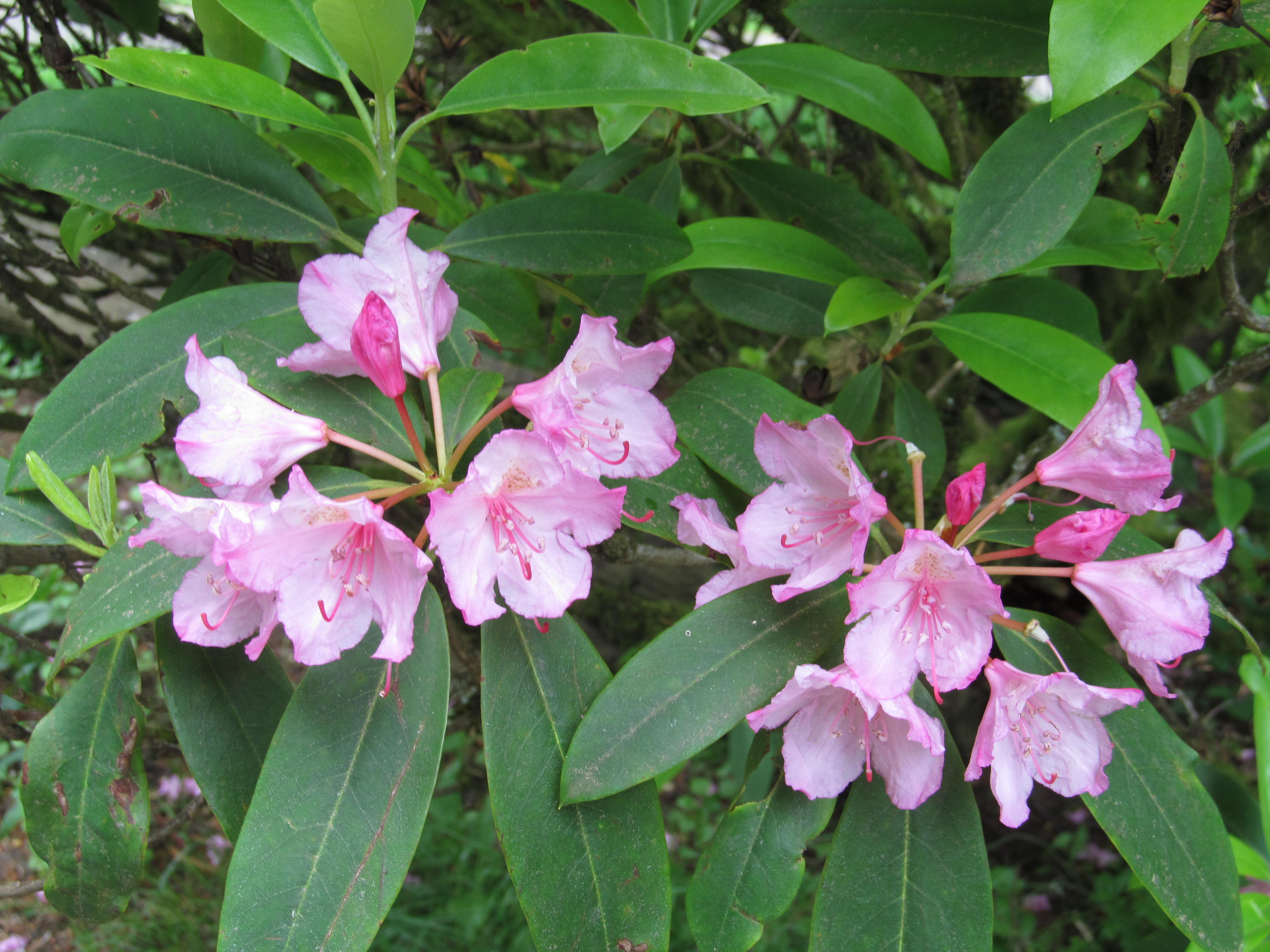
Close-up of flowers.

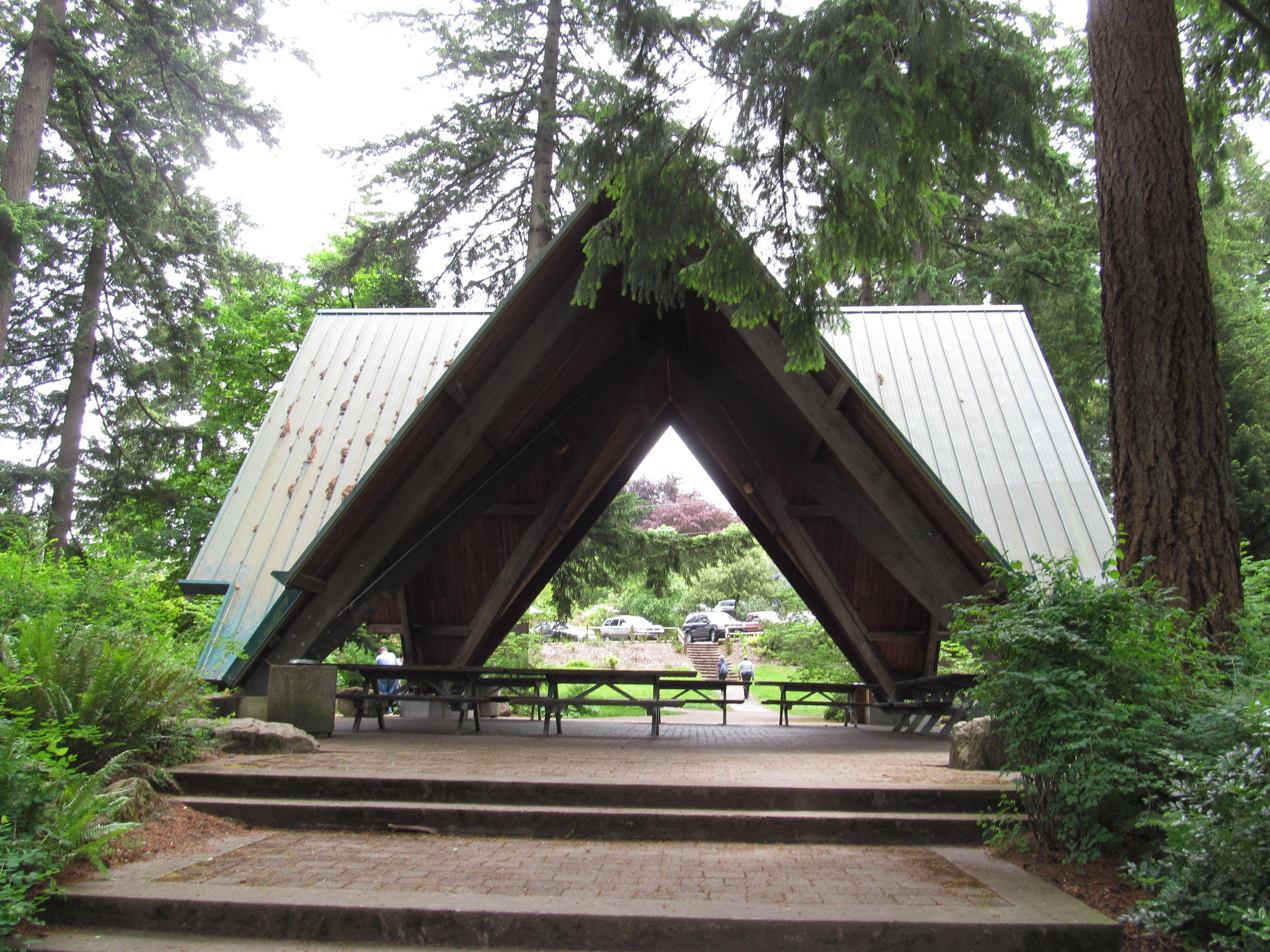
Pavilion.

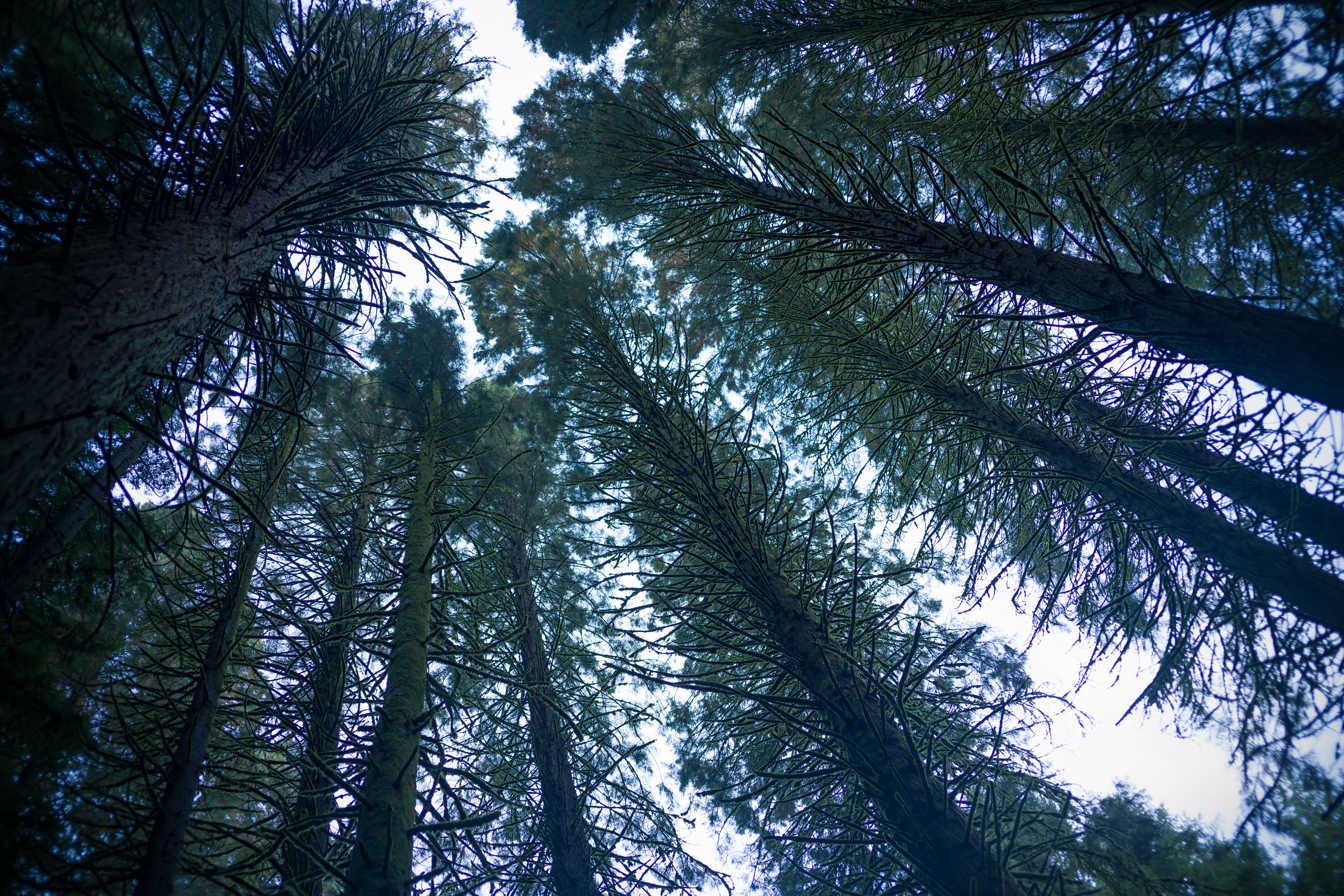
View of tree canopy.

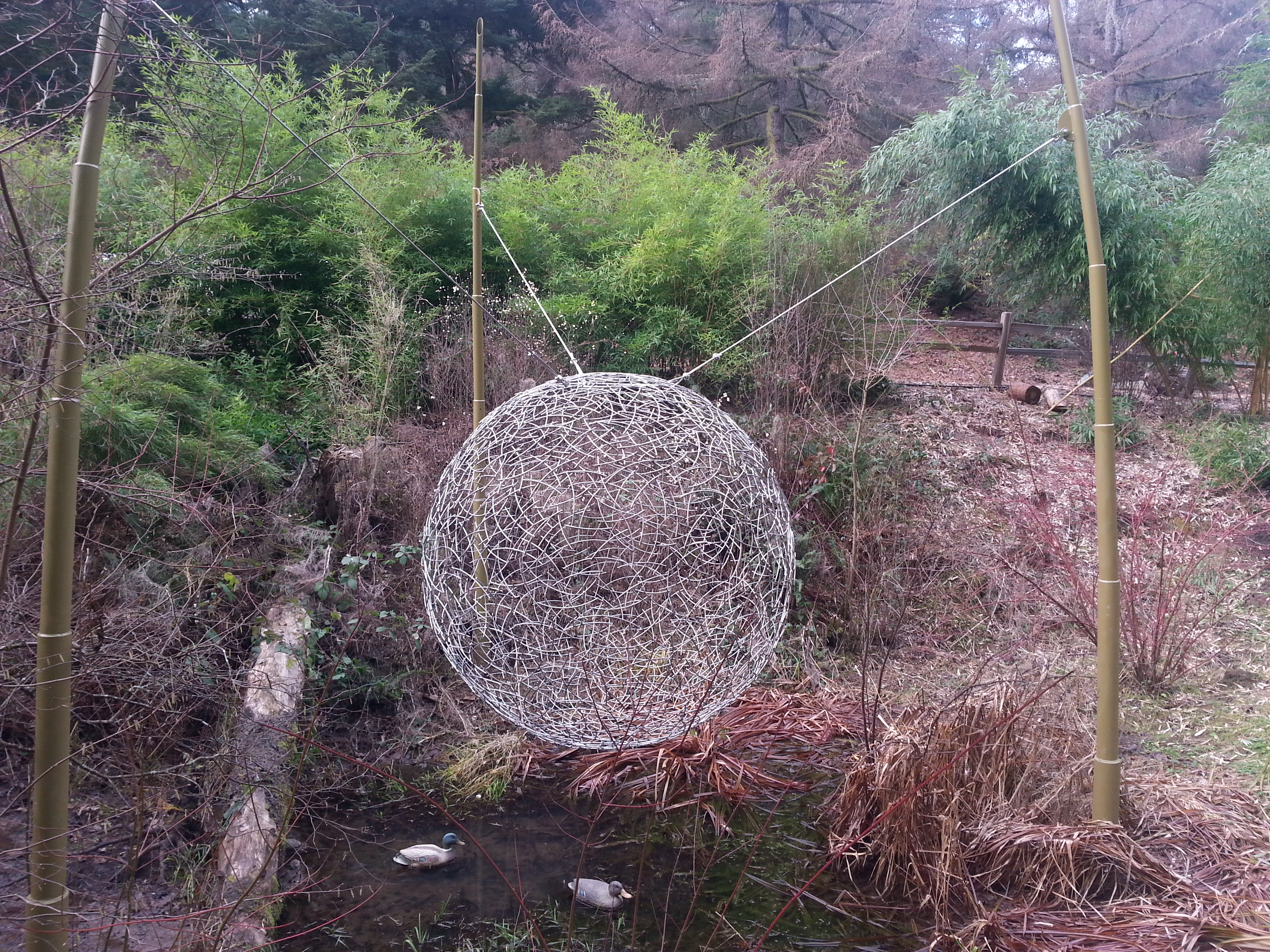
Basket of Air artwork.

== See also ==
- List of botanical gardens and arboretums in Oregon
- List of botanical gardens in the United States
