= List of mayors of Bend, Oregon =

This is a list of mayors of Bend, Oregon. The City of Bend was incorporated in 1904 and the first election for city leaders was held that year. The first mayor, Arthur L. Goodwillie, took office on January 4, 1905. Mayors were elected until Bend's charter was changed in 1928 following controversies sparked under the term of E.D. Gilson. The modified charter called for city councilors to appoint one member of the council to serve as mayor for a two-year term. The 1928 charter also moved Bend to a council–manager form of government, where the mayor leads city council while a city manager oversees day-to-day city operations. In May 2018, Bend voters approved charter amendments bringing back the direct election of the mayor.

Bend's mayors currently serve four-year terms and are directly elected by voters. The next election for mayor will be November 2026. The office is nonpartisan, meaning there is not a primary election or partisan affiliation on the ballot.

== List ==
Mayor	Term start	Term end
Directly elected mayors
Arthur L. Goodwillie	January 1905	1911
Urling C. Coe	1911	1912
George P. Putnam	1912	1913
Harry "Ham" Miller	1913	1915
? Eastes	c. 1916	???
???	???	???
Edgar Dewitt Gilson	1921	1922
Robert Fox	1923	1928
Council-appointed mayors
Herbert E. Allen	???	January 1929
George P. Gove	January 1929	January 1931
J. F. Hosch	January 1933	January 1935
Fred S. Simpson	January 1935	January 1943
A. T. Niebergall	January 1943	January 1947
G. W. McCann	January 1947	January 1948
Hans Slagsvold	January 1948	January 1949
Ted D. Sexton	January 1949	January 1951
W. T. Welcome	January 1951	January 1953
Richard W. Brandis	January 1953	January 1955
Hans Slagsvold	January 1955	January 1956
Hap Taylor	January 1956	January 1957
Web M. Loy	January 1957	January 1958
Mel Rogers	January 1958	January 1959
Jack C. Dempsey	January 1959	January 1960
William E. Miller	January 1960	January 1961
E. L. Nielsen	January 1961	January 1962
Jack C. Dempsey	January 1962	January 1965
Paul Reynolds	January 1965	January 1966
Charles B. Hinds	January 1966	January 1968
Leon Devereaux	January 1968	January 1969
???	???	???
Roger Smith	January 1975	January 1977
Clay C. Shephard	January 1977	January 1979
Dick Carlson	January 1979	January 1981
Ruth Burleigh (first woman mayor of Bend)	January 1981	January 1982
Philip A. Young	January 1982	January 1983
Samuel Langmas	January 1983	January 1984
Craig Coyner	January 1984	January 1985
Mike Rose	January 1985	January 1987
Bruce H. Devlin	January 1987	January 1989
Bill Friedman	January 2001	January 2003
Oran Teater	January 5, 2003	January 5, 2005
Bill Friedman	January 5, 2005	January 5, 2007
Bruce Abernethy	January 5, 2007	January 5, 2009
Kathie Eckman	January 5, 2009	January 5, 2011
Jeff T. Eager	January 5, 2011	January 5, 2013
Jim Clinton	January 5, 2013	January 4, 2017
Casey Roats	January 4, 2017	January 4, 2019
Direct election resumes
Sally Russell	January 4, 2019	May 18, 2022
Gena Goodman-Campbell	May 18, 2022	January 4, 2023
Melanie Kebler	January 4, 2023	Incumbent

== See also ==
- List of mayors of places in Oregon
