= Dunthorpe, Oregon =

Unincorporated community in the state of Oregon, United States

- Census-designated place
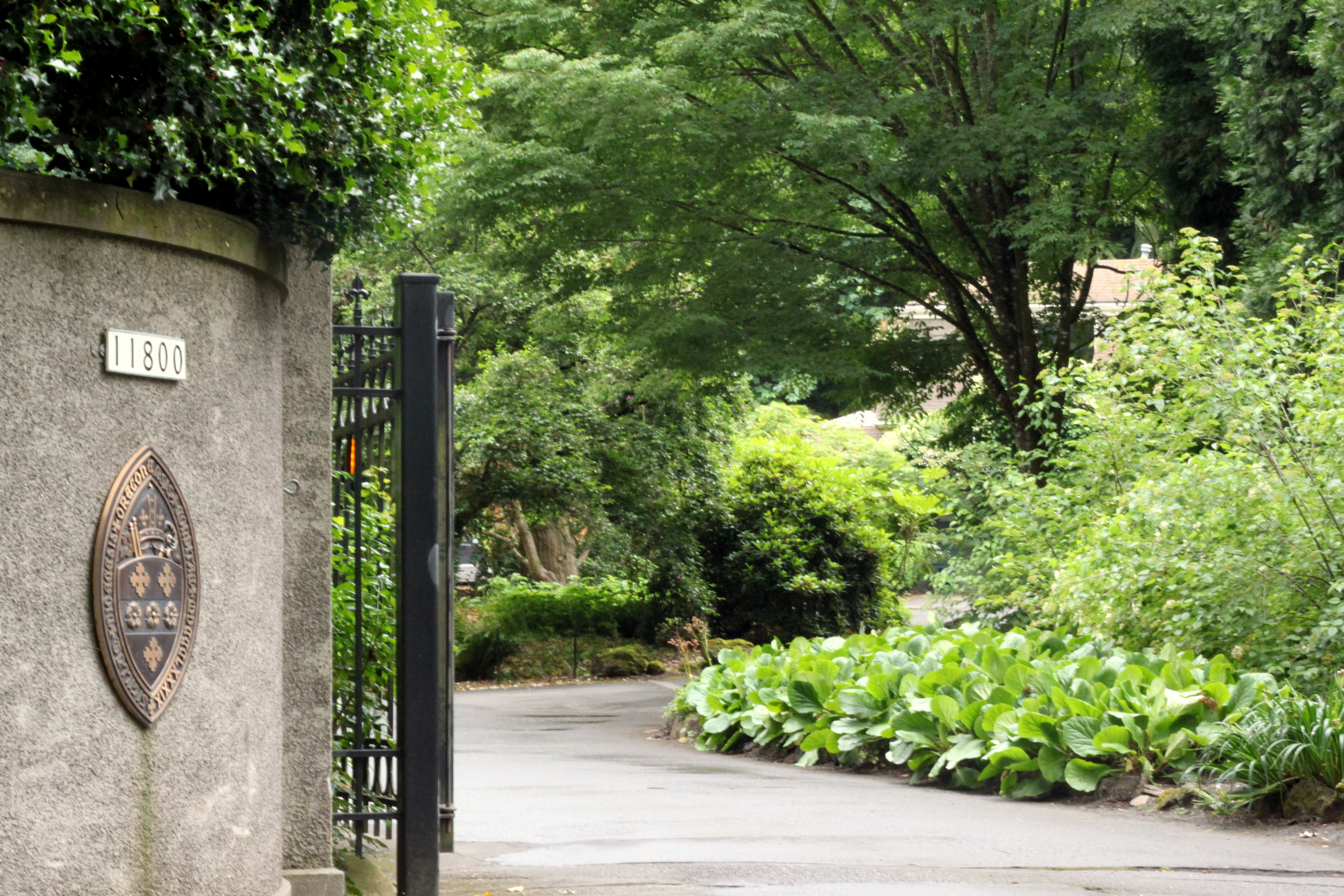
- Entrance to Elk Rock Gardens of the Bishop's Close in Dunthorpe

- Location within Oregon Location within the United States
- Coordinates: 45°26′9″N 122°39′14″W
- Country: United States
- State: Oregon
- County: Multnomah

Area
  - Total: 1.19 sq mi (3.08 km^{2})
  - Land: 1.05 sq mi (2.72 km^{2})
  - Water: 0.14 sq mi (0.36 km^{2})

Population (2020)
  - Total: 1,704
  - Density: 1,620.0/sq mi (625.47/km^{2})
- Time zone: UTC-8 (Pacific (PST))
  - Summer (DST): UTC-7 (PDT)
- ZIP Code: 97219 (Portland)
- Area codes: 503 and 971
- FIPS code: 41-21215
- GNIS feature ID: 1136234

Dunthorpe is a census-designated place (CDP) and unincorporated suburb of Portland, Oregon, United States. As of the 2020 census, it had a population of 1,704. It is located just south of the Portland city limits and north of the Multnomah County line on the west side of the Willamette River. Lewis & Clark College, Tryon Creek State Natural Area, and Lake Oswego are nearby.

== History ==
In January 1916, William M. Ladd's Ladd Estate Company purchased 215 acres (0.87 km^{2}) from the soon to be dissolved Oregon Iron & Steel Company for $1. The company drafted very specific provisions for the Dunthorpe development, including: Only residential buildings were allowed, except for outbuildings to house domestic animals; Swine and goats were prohibited; The minimum cost of a house was $3000; No residence could be used or occupied by "persons of African or Mongolian descent" unless they were employed as servants of the masters; and the sale of "intoxicating liquor" was also prohibited.

== Geography ==
Dunthorpe is in southwestern Multnomah County; it is bordered to the north and west by the city of Portland, to the east by the Willamette River, across which is the city of Milwaukie in Clackamas County, and to the south by an unincorporated portion of Clackamas County. The city of Lake Oswego touches the southwest corner of Dunthorpe. Lewis and Clark College, within the city of Portland, borders Dunthorpe to the northwest. Tryon Creek State Natural Area, also within the Portland city limits, borders Dunthorpe to the west.

Oregon Route 43 passes through Dunthorpe, following the Willamette River. It leads north 5 miles (8 km) into Portland and south through Lake Oswego 7 miles (11 km) to Oregon City.

According to the U.S. Census Bureau, the Dunthorpe CDP has a total area of 1.19 square miles (3.08 km^{2}), of which 1.05 square miles (2.72 km^{2}) are land and 0.14 square miles (0.36 km^{2}), or 11.6%, are water in the Willamette River.

== Demographics ==
Historical population
Census	Pop.	Note	%±
2020	1,704		—
U.S. Decennial Census

== Arts and culture ==
=== Museums and other points of interest ===
Attractions of the area is the Elk Rock Gardens of the Bishop's Close, an estate which consists of 13 acres (53,000 m^{2}) on a high bluff on the western bank of the Willamette River. The property includes approximately 6 acres (2.4 ha) of cultivated English-style gardens. The garden is known for the many varieties of magnolias as well as for examples of many other native and exotic plants.

== Education ==
Riverdale School District includes Dunthorpe in its jurisdiction.

As a community, Dunthorpe was historically anchored by Riverdale Grade School. In the early 1990s, the Oregon legislature decreed that all school districts should have both primary and secondary schools, and expected smaller school districts like Riverdale to merge. While an old grade school was purchased and renovated for use as Riverdale High School, high school students were bussed to nearby Marylhurst University in the neighboring city of West Linn, where space was leased by the school district.

In September 2002, the high school moved into its permanent building, a renovation and expansion of an existing but unused public school structure. In November 2008, the voters of Riverdale School District passed a measure authorizing the District to issue bonds in an amount up to $21.5 million to renovate and expand the existing grade school building. In July 2009, the original grade school was demolished. The building was rebuilt in the style of the original in 2010.

== Notable residents ==
- LaMarcus Aldridge (1985–), professional basketball player
- Brandin Cooks (1993–), professional football player
- Maurice E. Crumpacker (1886–1927), U.S. congressman from Oregon
- Clyde Drexler (1962–), retired professional basketball player and Hall of Famer
- Channing Frye (1983–), professional basketball player
- Danny Glover (1946–), actor
- William McCormick (1939-), US Ambassador to New Zealand
- Bob Packwood (1932–2026), former U.S. senator from Oregon
- Robert B. Pamplin, Sr. (1911-2009), president & CEO of Georgia-Pacific
- Terry Porter (1963–), professional basketball coach and former player
- Linus Torvalds (1969–), software engineer; creator of the Linux kernel and Git version control system
