= Rob Saxton =

Rob Saxton is an educational administrator and former Interim Superintendent of Greater Albany Public Schools in Albany, Oregon from June 2021 to June 2022.

He previously served from 2012 to 2015 as Oregon's first executive "Deputy Superintendent of Public Instruction," the chief administrator of the Oregon Department of Education.

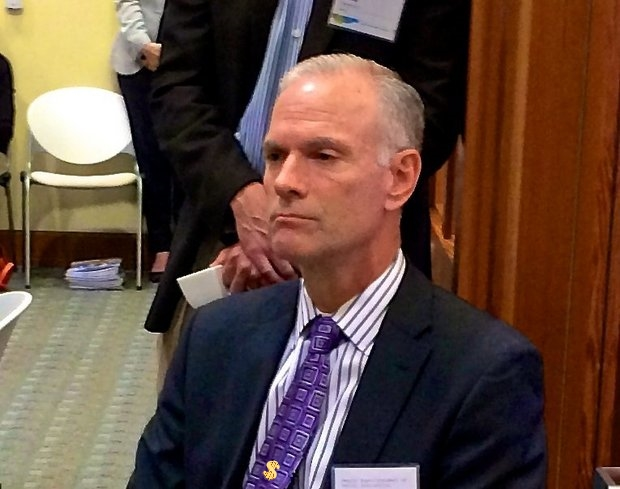
Rob Saxton, Former Oregon Deputy Superintendent of Public Instruction

== Career ==
=== Early career ===
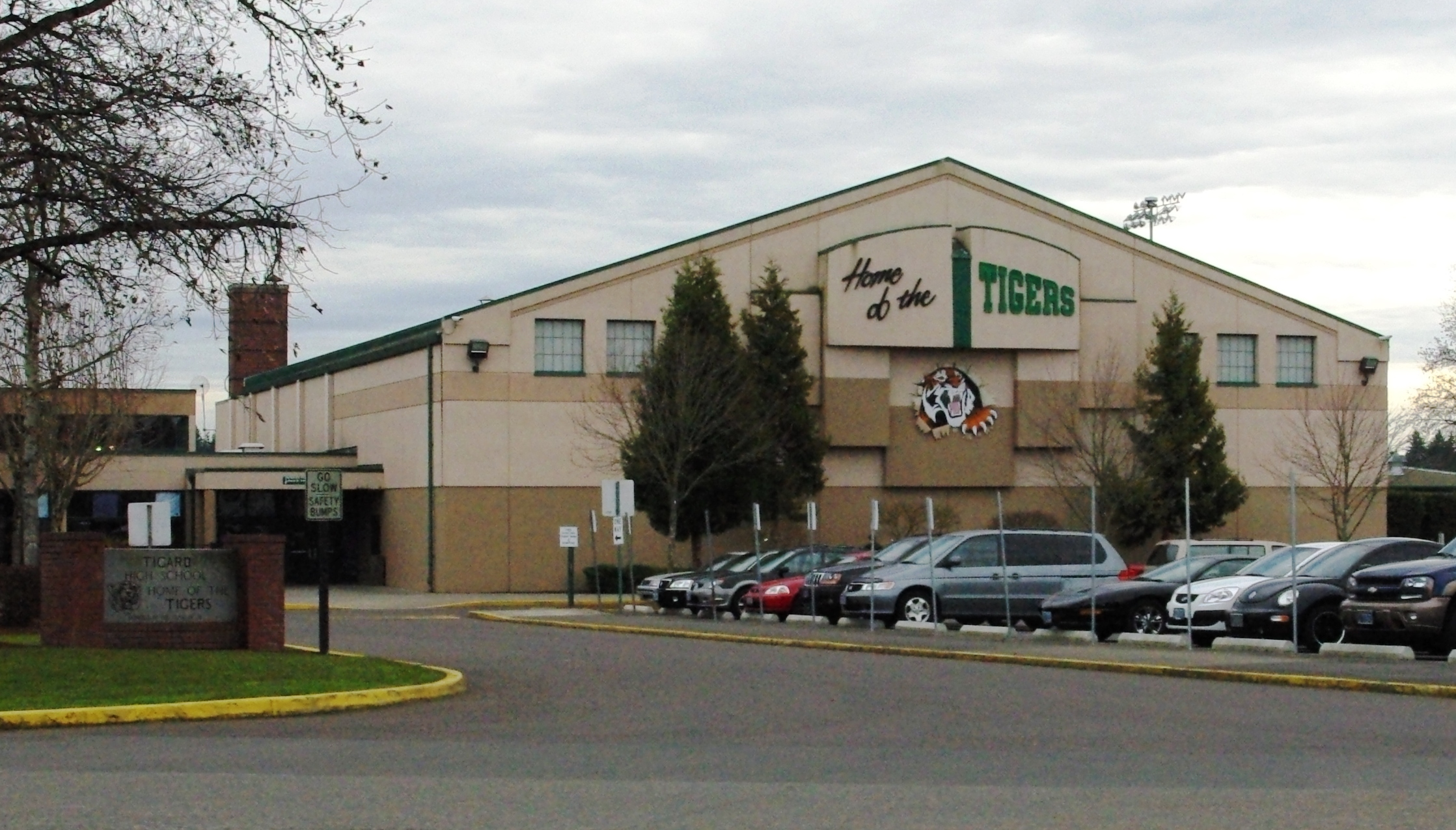
Tigard High School in the Tigard-Tualatin School District

Saxton started his career in education as a teacher and football coach in Big Spring, Texas. He returned to his home state after accepting a job teaching in Albany, Oregon. Rob's first administrative position was at West Albany High. He later held school administrative posts in nearby districts of McMinnville, Oregon and Sherwood, Oregon. Following this, he was hired as Superintendent of Tigard-Tualatin School District. He served as superintendent in Tigard-Tualatin for seven years.

=== Deputy Superintendent of Public Instruction ===
From 1872 to 2012, the Oregon Department of Education was led by an elected constitutional officer titled the Oregon Superintendent of Public Instruction. However, in 2012, the Oregon legislature eliminated the office of Superintendent of Public Instruction and consolidated its functions with the office of governor. Under the new system, the Governor John Kitzhaber appointed Saxton as the first ever "Deputy Superintendent," a new position in charge of the day-to-day operation of the Oregon Department of Education. The Deputy Superintendent of Public Instruction is a professional position, as opposed to an elected position.

Saxton left the Deputy Superintendent position in 2015 to become Superintendent of Northwest Regional Education Service District.
