= Claire Hanley Arboretum =

Arboretum in Medford, Oregon

Coordinates: 42.33049°N 122.93885°W

- Interactive map of Claire Hanley Arboretum
- Type: Arboretum
- Location: Medford, Oregon, United States
- Operator: Oregon State University

Claire Hanley Arboretum is an arboretum located on the grounds at the Oregon State University Extension and Research campus, 569 Hanley Road, Medford, Oregon.

The arboretum was first planted in the 1960s by the Hanley sisters, with additional plantings since 1995. Mature trees include the dogwood Cornus mas, Davidia involucrata, and Oxydendrum arboreum.

The arboretum land was once part of the Michael Hanley Farmstead. Michael Hanley purchased the original donation land claim from David Clinton and Archibald Welton.

Upon his death, the farm was divided with Alice Hanley receiving the portion with the home and buildings. On her death the property was left to her niece Claire Hanley, and her sisters Martha and Mary Hanley; daughters of Alice's older brother John A Hanley.

== See also ==
- List of botanical gardens in the United States
