= K. Daniel O'Leary =

American psychologist (born 1940)

- Born: Keith Daniel O'Leary; 1940 (age 85–86)
- Education: Pennsylvania State University; University of Illinois at Urbana–Champaign
- Known for: Research on intimate partner violence
- Spouse: Susan O'Leary
- Awards: Fellow of the American Association for Advancement of Science
- Scientific career
- Fields: Clinical psychology
- Institutions: Stony Brook University
- Thesis: The Effects of Verbal and Nonverbal Training on Learning and Immoral Behavior (1967)

K. Daniel O'Leary (born 1940) is an American psychologist who is Distinguished Professor of Clinical Psychology at Stony Brook University. Much of his research has focused on the causes and prevention of intimate partner violence, as well as the long-term persistence of romantic love between married partners. In 1969, he and his wife Susan O'Leary, also a professor at Stony Brook, started a program there dedicated to counteracting antisocial behavior in children. He has served as president of the Association for Advancement of Behavior Therapy, the New York chapter of the Association of Family and Conciliation Courts, and section 3 of Division 12 of the American Psychological Association (also known as the Society for a Science of Clinical Psychology).

== Honors and awards ==
In 2015, O'Leary received a $25,000 prize from the Elizabeth Hurlock Beckman Award Trust for motivating his students. In 2018, he was named a fellow of the American Association for Advancement of Science.
