= Martha Springer Botanical Garden =

Botanical garden in Salem, Oregon

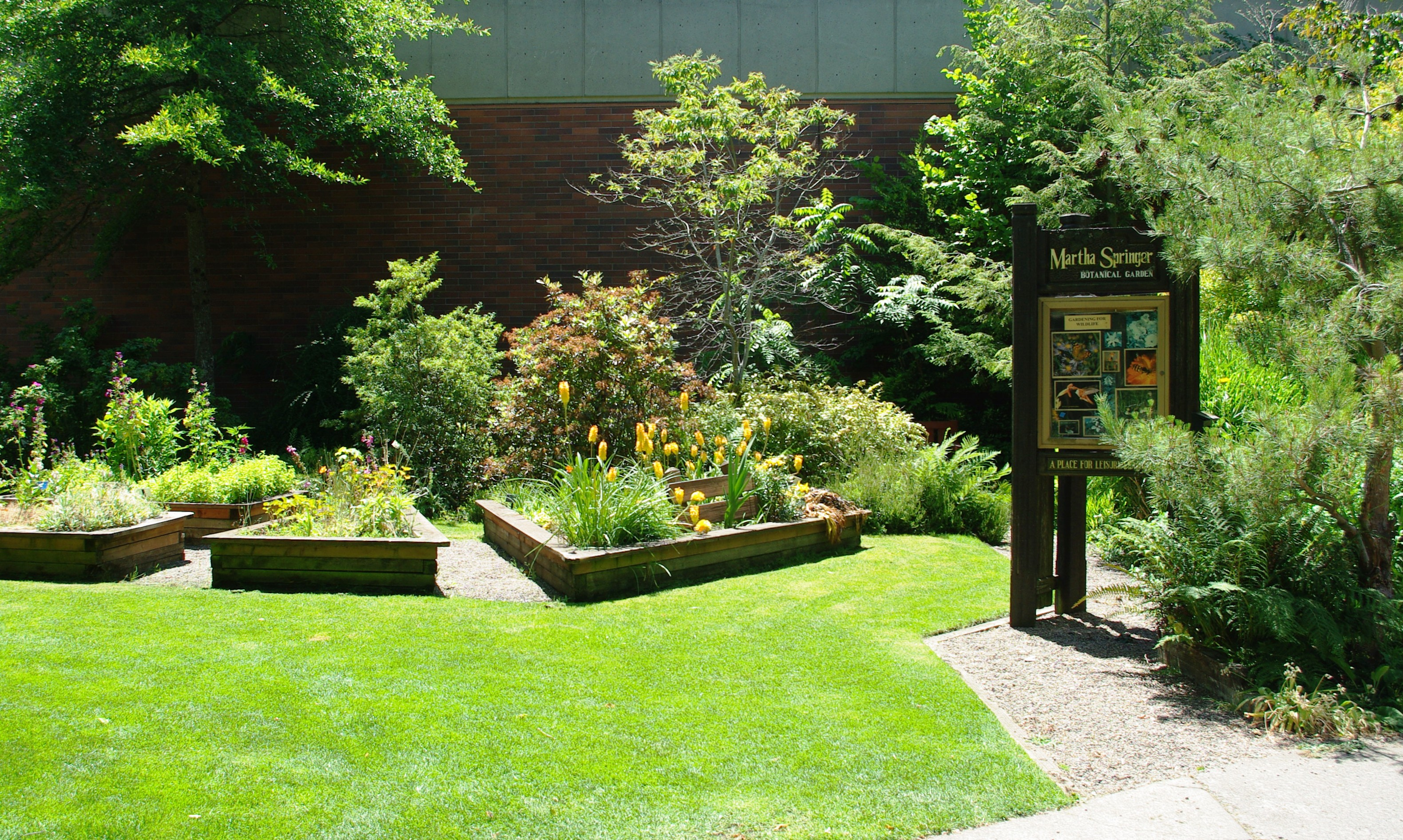
- Entrance to the garden
- Interactive map of Martha Springer Botanical Garden
- Type: Botanical garden
- Location: Salem, Oregon, United States
- Coordinates: 44.935343°N 123.029607°W
- Area: 1-acre (0.40 ha)
- Opened: 1988
- Owner: Willamette University
- Status: Open to the public

The Martha Springer Botanical Garden is a botanical garden on the campus of Willamette University, in Salem, Oregon, United States. Opened in 1988, the 1-acre (4,000 m^{2}) garden contains twelve smaller gardens stretched along the Mill Race that bisects the campus.

== About ==
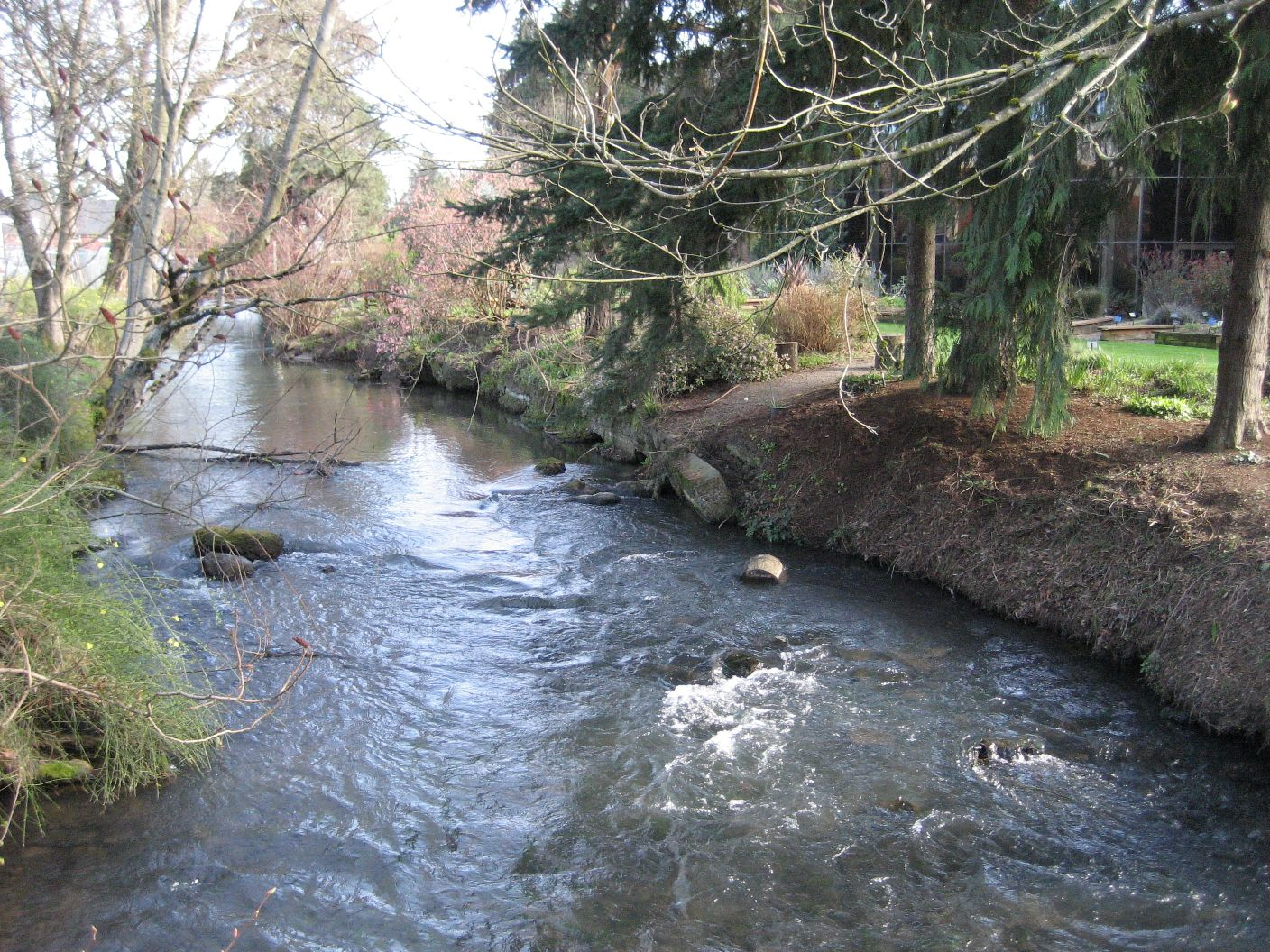
Mill Race passing the garden

The garden was dedicated in 1988 in honor of Professor Martha Springer, a biologist at the school. Elaine Joines served as the first curator of the garden. The garden's long, narrow site behind the athletic building is divided into 12 smaller gardens, including a butterfly garden, herb garden, alpine rock garden, theme borders, and ethnobotany gardens. Much of the garden contains species native to the state of Oregon. Other plants include pink varieties of Lagerstroemia. The botanical garden lies along the Mill Race that splits the school's campus after leaving the Thomas Kay Woolen Mill site to the east.

Martha Springer Botanical Garden is sometimes referred to as a secret garden since few people are aware of its existence and it is tucked away behind buildings on the campus. Other features of the free garden include benches, a rock fountain, and roses. The 1-acre (4,000 m^{2}) site is used for educating students at the school, and is open to the public.

== See also ==
- List of botanical gardens in the United States
