= Lacey Beaty =

American politician (born 1984)

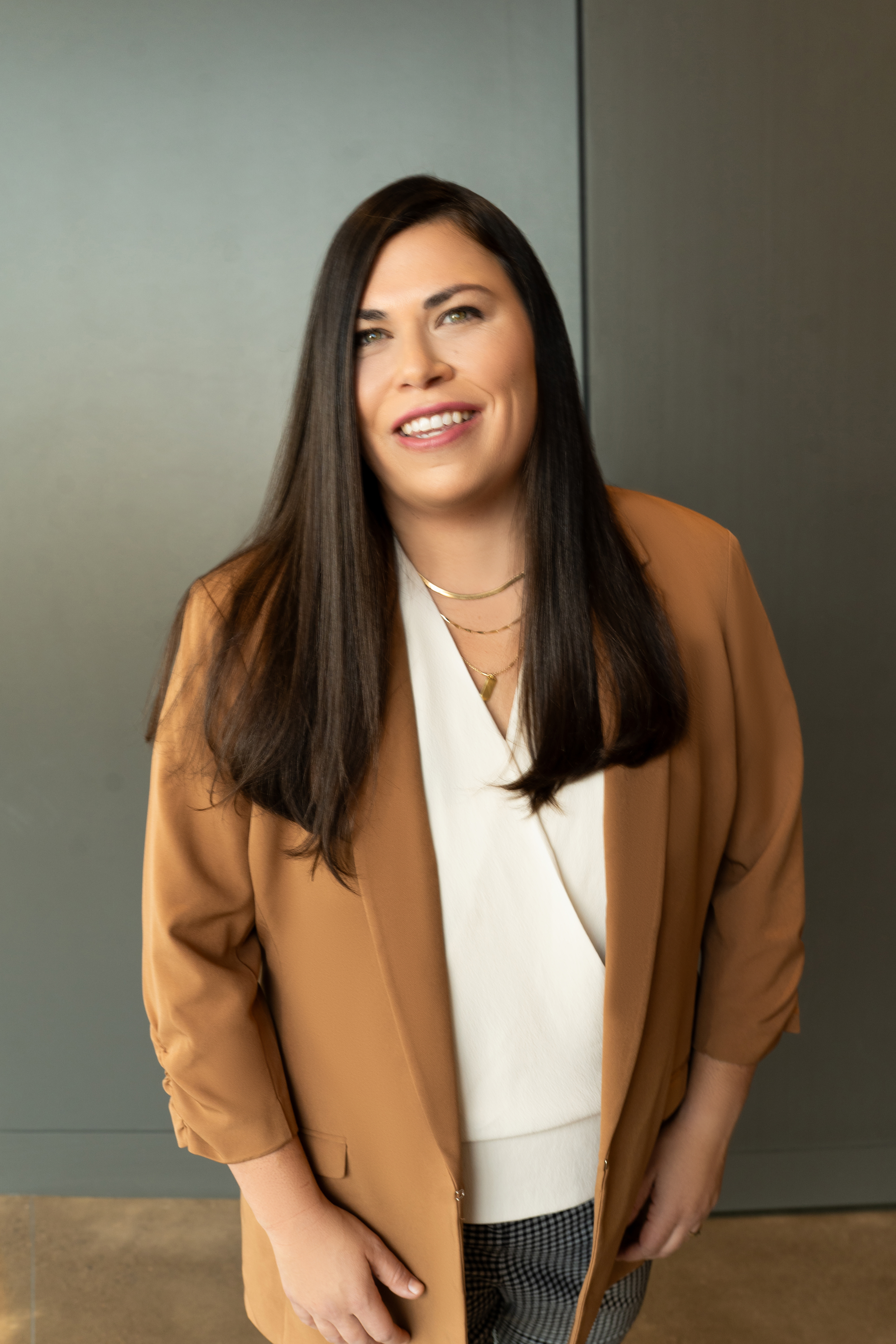

Mayor of Beaverton, Oregon
- Incumbent
- Assumed office January 2021
- Preceded by: Denny Doyle

Personal details
- Born: June 6, 1984 (age 41)
- Party: Democratic
- Spouse: Ian Beaty
- Education: Oregon State University (BA) Warner Pacific University (MA)

Military service
- Branch/service: United States Army
- Years of service: 2002–2008
- Battles/wars: Iraq War

Lacey Beaty is an American politician, combat veteran, and the current mayor of Beaverton, Oregon. She took office in 2021 as the first female and youngest mayor in Beaverton history, after serving six years as city councilor. Before entering politics, Beaty served five years of active duty in the 1st Infantry Division of the United States Army as a radiology specialist and combat medic during the Iraq War. She has also worked in public health, overseeing school-based health centers. Beaty has identified the homelessness crisis and the welfare of veterans as priority issues for her administration.

In 2015, Beaty served on the National League of Cities human development steering committee. In 2016, she was named Outstanding Woman Veteran of the Year by the Oregon Department of Veterans' Affairs (ODVA). Portland Business Journal named her to its "40 Under 40" list for 2022. In 2023, Beaty became a member of Politico's inaugural Fifty Mayors Club.

== Early life and education ==
Beaty was raised by a single mother in San Diego, California. She was the goalie of her women's lacrosse team at Poway High School and won the state championship. Upon graduating, and just before the 9/11 attacks, Beaty enlisted in the United States Army. In 2004, she was deployed as a combat medic to the Iraq War following the 2003 invasion of Iraq. She also served for three years in Germany.

After five years of active duty in the United States Army, Beaty enrolled at Oregon State University using the G.I. Bill. In 2012, she earned her Bachelor of Arts in political science. In 2013, Beaty earned a Master of Arts in organizational leadership from Warner Pacific University.

Beginning in 2008, Beaty coached women's lacrosse. She coached at Beaverton High School from 2008 to 2014, and later at George Fox University until 2021, when she was sworn in as mayor. She also served as the president of the Oregon Girls Lacrosse Association.

In 2022, Beaty joined the Bloomberg Harvard City Leadership Initiative's year-long professional development program, as part of its sixth class of 40 mayors from around the world.

== Political career ==
Prior to running for elected office, Beaty served as vice chair of Beaverton's Visioning Advisory Committee.

=== Beaverton City Council ===
In 2014, Beaty ran for the city council of Beaverton, Oregon. She defeated incumbent Ian King in a three-way primary with 55 percent of the vote and went on to win the general election uncontested.

In January 2015, at age 30, she assumed office as the youngest-ever elected official in Beaverton's history, and went on to serve on the city council for six years. As city councilor, she was an advocate for veterans, supporting Beaverton's designation as a Purple Heart City and recognition of service-disabled veterans in the city's Minority, Women, and Emerging Small Business Policy. While in office, she also worked as director for Virginia Garcial Memorial Health Center's school-based health clinics across Washington and Yamhill counties.

=== Mayor of Beaverton ===
In 2020, Beaty ran for mayor of Beaverton, a position that Denny Doyle had held for 11 years. She won 34% of the vote in the May primary, against Doyle's 45%. The two advanced to a runoff election. Beaty was elected mayor of Beaverton with 53.3% of the vote in the November 2020 runoff. She took office in January 2021 as the role of mayor was transitioning by charter to a "city manager" form of government, away from the commission manager system that had been in place previously.

As the first female and youngest mayor of Beaverton, Beaty has focused on affordable housing. In 2022, she joined a task force of 25 mayors from the Oregon Mayors Association in requesting state funds to address homelessness. In her 2023 State of the City address, she called housing a "fundamental human right", noting the development of new shelters, including the first-ever year-round shelter in Beaverton.

In January 2021, Beaty helped to organize a COVID-19 Summit bringing together leaders from the public and private sectors to discuss making vaccines available to local residents. Two weeks later, they piloted the first mass vaccination site in Washington County in the parking garage at Nike world headquarters in Beaverton, distributing nearly 50,000 doses of the vaccine. Another key initiative for Beaty has been the Beaverton Loop Project to improve safety for cyclists and pedestrians, for which she has sought federal funding. In May 2023, Beaty approved Resolution No. 4838 – "The Beaverton Downtown Loop Project." This project will support climate friendly transportation by linking key destinations in Downtown Beaverton.

In December 2021, Beaty filed a complaint with the League of Oregon Cities when its executive director Mike Cully sent her a slew of abusive private messages on Twitter calling her "weak". Beaty had publicly called out Cully for announcing that he refused to tip fast food workers during the COVID-19 pandemic, and that they should "Get an education and a better job." Cully later apologized, deleted his Twitter account, and resigned.

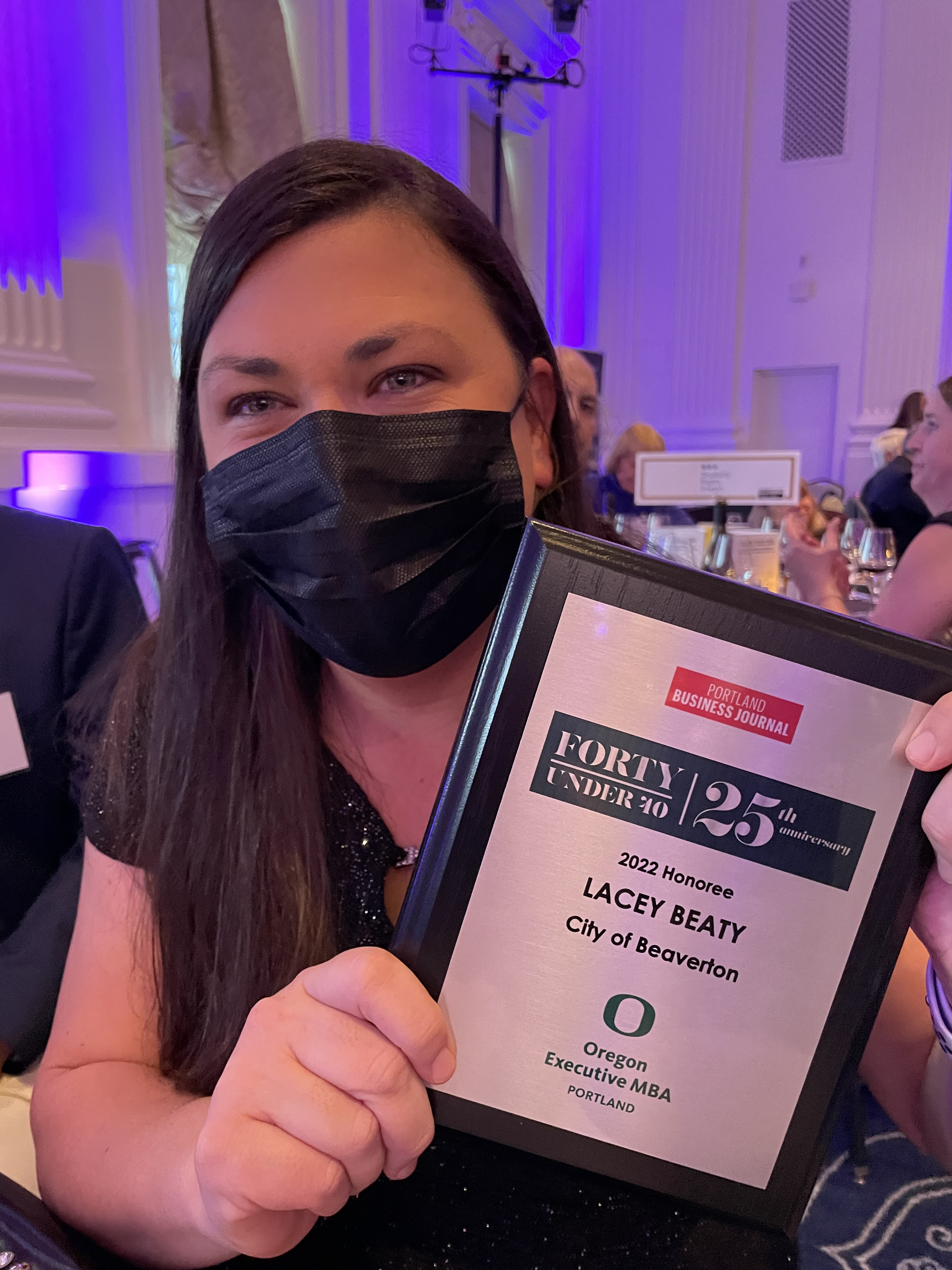
In 2022, Lacey Beaty was honored with Portland Business Journal's Forty Under 40 Award.

In September 2022, Beaty stated that her top three priorities were: homelessness, the climate crisis and planning for the future. Beaty approved Resolution No. 2712 establishing the Beaverton Climate Action Task Force. In August 2023, Beaty said that Beaverton is focused on growing business and investing in climate resiliency. She said that while growth is important, this should be balanced with sustainability. She cited the Beaverton Purple Pipe system as a method for keeping the city primed for future growth. According to the Beaverton Valley Times, Beaty said, "It sometimes feels like water isn't a problem in Oregon because it comes out of the sky so much, but we have to fiercely protect our drinking water. And when we use our drinking water to irrigate lawns and stuff like that, it's not the best and greatest use..." This initiative is a cost-effective alternative to irrigating green spaces by recharging groundwater and stormwater rather than using precious drinking water. The pipes are purple to distinguish them from pipes that carry drinking water. Speaking of the Purple Pipe program, Ken Helm said it is, "something for the whole city to the proud of. All over the west we are in a long-term drought. It is not going to go away soon."

In 2025, Beatty oversaw the third consecutive year of budget cuts for the City of Beaverton, including the continued elimination of police and library positions in fiscal year 2025–2026.

== Personal life ==
Lacey and her husband Ian Beaty have lived in Beaverton since 2008. Ian is also a member of the armed services and was deployed to Afghanistan following Beaty's election to the Beaverton City Council in 2014. They have a daughter. According to an interview with Medium, her favorite movie is Talladega Nights.
