= List of mayors of Milwaukie, Oregon =

Milwaukie, Oregon was incorporated on February 4, 1903. Current mayor Lisa Batey took office January 1, 2023.

== List ==
- William Shindler (1903–1909)
- Philip Streib (1909–1913)
- E.T. Elmer (1913–1915)
- Guy C. Pelton (1915–1917)
- John Snyder (1917–1923)
- Alfred E. Cowell (1923–1927)
- J.J. Miller (1927–1935)
- J.M. Mason (1935)
- William Sanders (1935–1937)
- Earl S. Burdick (1937–1940)
- Fred O. Roberts (1940–1945)
- Fred Sperr (1945–1952)
- Leonard Mullan (1952–1959)
- Earl Clay (1959–1963)
- Joe Bernard, Jr. (1963–1965)
- George Haley (1965)
- Robert Richmond (1965–1968)
- Frank Clore (1968–1969)
- Donald Graf (1969–1975)
- Bill Hupp (1975–1979)
- Allen Manuel (1979–1980)
- Joy Burgess (1980–1984)
- Ron Kinsella (1984–1986)
- Roger Hall (1986–1990)
- Craig Lomnicki (1990–1998)
- Donald Graf (1998)
- Carolyn Tomei (1998–2001)
- James Bernard (2001–2009)
- Jeremy Ferguson (2009 – February 7, 2015)
- Wilda Parks (February 17, 2015 – May 19, 2015)
- Mark Gamba (May 19, 2015 – January 1, 2023)
- Lisa Batey (January 1, 2023 – Present)
