= Daniel O'Leary (chemist) =

American chemist

Daniel J. O'Leary is an American organic chemist. He is the Carnegie Professor of Chemistry at Pomona College in Claremont, California, and runs a lab that uses nuclear magnetic resonance spectroscopy to study compounds.
