= Shute Park (Oregon) =

Municipal park in Hillsboro, Oregon

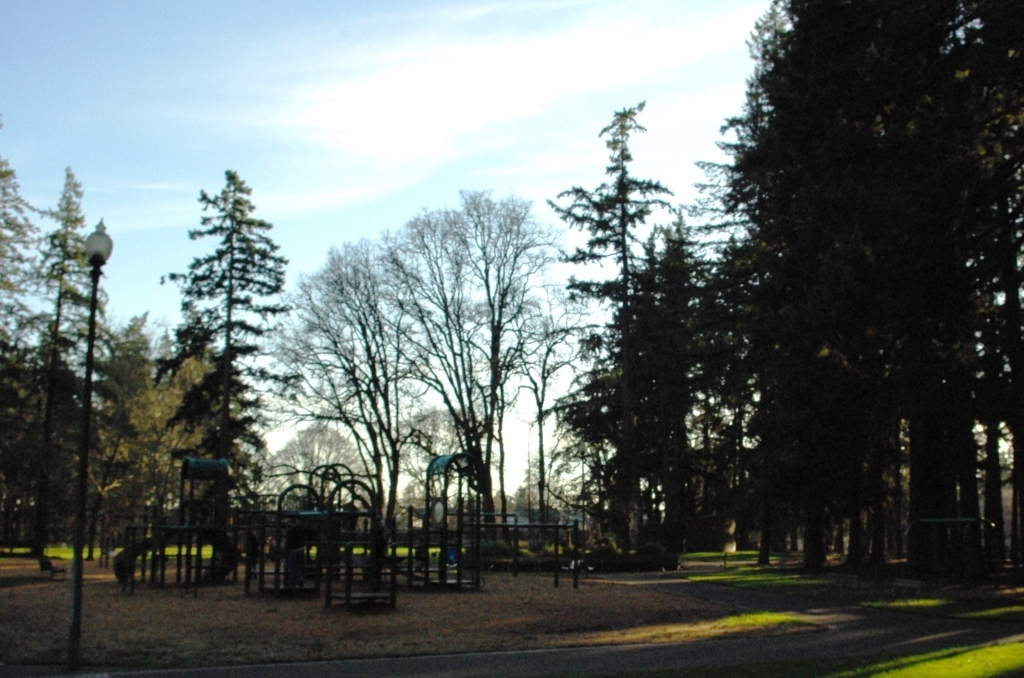
- Playground at the park
- Interactive map of Shute Park
- Type: Public, city
- Location: Hillsboro, Oregon, United States
- Coordinates: 45°30′43″N 122°58′25″W
- Area: 13 acres (53,000 m^{2})
- Created: 1906
- Operator: Hillsboro Parks & Recreation Department
- Status: open
- Website: Shute Park

Shute Park is a municipal park in the city of Hillsboro, Oregon, United States. Acquired in 1906, the 13-acre (53,000 m^{2}) park is the oldest park in the city. Located at southeast Tenth and Maple streets along Tualatin Valley Highway, Shute Park includes an aquatic center, a branch of the Hillsboro Public Library, and a community center. The park once had a pavilion that contained a roller skating rink, and was the center of civic activities before the opening of the Washington County Fairgrounds. Named for businessman John W. Shute, the park at one time included land on the east side of the highway that consisted mainly of a baseball field.

== History ==
On December 21, 1906, the City of Hillsboro purchased a 15-acre (61,000 m^{2}) tract of land from banker John W. Shute for $1,622, with the condition that the land be used as a park and named in his honor. The city passed a levy to finance the purchase of its first park at 1.8 mills per assessed valuation. At the time, the total assessed value in the city was just over $600,000. The land had previously been the site of a brickyard, whose brick had been used in the construction of several buildings in downtown Hillsboro.

In June 1920, voters approved a levy to finance the construction of a pavilion at the park. Finished in June 1921, the 71-by-117-foot (22 by 36 m) building was designed and built without posts in the floor and included a stage. At first, the pavilion was used mainly for dances, but was later used as a roller skating rink. It also was home to an infantry unit and later artillery unit, and during World War II was used for drill by the national guard. Over time, the building eventually no longer met building codes, but the city felt the costs were too much to remodel the facility so the pavilion was torn down in 1974.

Beginning in 1925 and until 1951, the Washington County Fair was held at the park. During that time, the park contained additional structures, including a poultry building. In 1935, workers from the Works Progress Administration improved the park. Enhancements included extensive landscaping, the addition of a baseball diamond, construction of a stone-arch bridge, a creek, and the addition of lighting. The improved park was dedicated on July 2, 1936. Hillsboro's Happy Days festival was also previously staged at Shute Park. The pavilion at Shute could seat as many as 1,500 and was used for events that included a circus.

In 1962, the county's historical society looked at the park as a possible home for their museum, which was not built at that time or at that location. However, the society temporarily moved their museum to the park's pavilion that year. The city decided to re-zone a 5.5-acre (2.2 ha) section of the park in 1972. The section was located across Tualatin Valley Highway and contained a baseball field. Hillsboro High School had used the ball field for its home baseball games until Hare Field opened in 1965. The parks department wanted to sell off the land in order to pay for improvements at other park facilities in the city. Hillsboro's city council elected to re-zone the parcel as commercial in order to maximize the value of the land.

The city's parks commission approved plans to build the permanent stage in the park in September 1982 using private funds. In 1987, the 25-foot (7.6 m) Peter Wolf Toth statue, Chief Kno-Tah, was added along the eastern side of the park. It is one of 74 such statues collectively known as the Trail of the Whispering Giants. In 2006, the city celebrated the 100th anniversary of the park that included people in period dress and a performance by the Oregon Symphonic Band. Many of the Douglas fir trees at the park were found to have schweinitzii butt rot and red ring rot in 2008. In May 2009, the city began removing those diseased trees that posed a danger to park visitors as the trees slowly died. Additional trees were removed in 2013 as part of the renovations to the library.

== Facilities ==
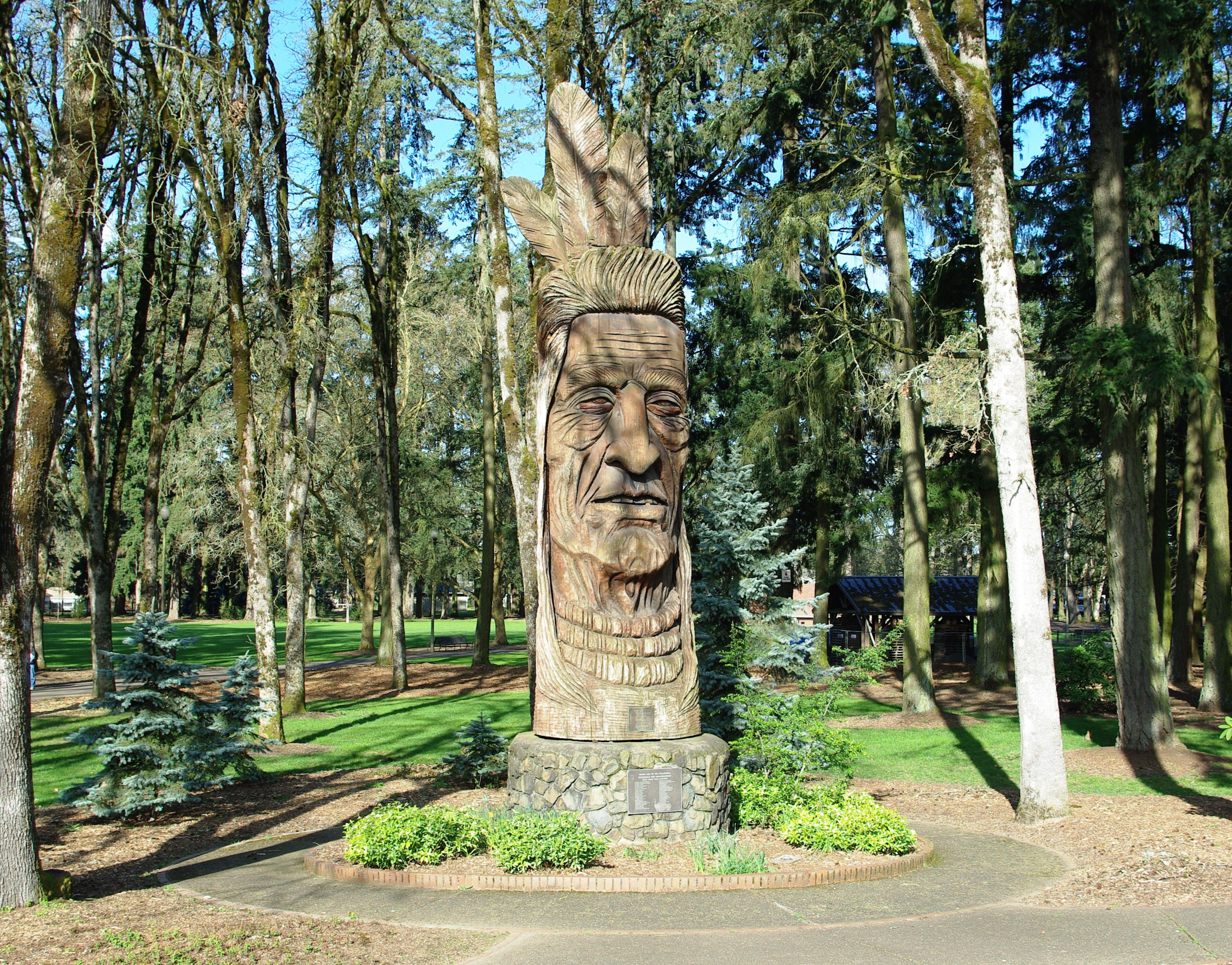
Chief Kno-Tah sculpture located in the park for 30 years until 2017

Located at 10th and Maple streets, the park contains a variety of amenities. These include a picnic shelter, softball field, restrooms, picnic areas, playground equipment, and a stage. Also at the park is a branch of the Hillsboro library, a senior community center, and an aquatic recreation center. From 1987 to 2017, it also hosted the Chief Kno-Tah wood sculpture of a Native American head carved by Peter Wolf Toth as part of his Trail of the Whispering Giants.

The Shute Park Aquatic and Recreation Center opened in 1981. The indoor and outdoor pool facility also contained indoor exercise areas and racquetball courts. Beginning in 2004 it was remodeled and re-opened in 2006. Additions to the facility included a massage room, child care area, a spa pool, a pool slide, and a play feature in one of the pools.

Shute Park also hosts the annual Showtime at Shute free summer concert series. These outdoor concerts are held each Thursday beginning in July, and run through August.

== See also ==
- Shute Park Plaza
- Hillsboro Stadium
- Hondo Dog Park
- Noble Woods Park
