= Hillsboro Police Department (Oregon) =

Hillsboro, Oregon, USA

Coordinates: 45.520797°N 122.973254°W

Jurisdictional structure
- Legal jurisdiction: City of Hillsboro

Operational structure
- Sworn members: 127
- Unsworn members: 42
- Agency executives: Jim Coleman, Chief of Police; Doug Ehrich, Commander; Jim Coleman, Deputy Chief

Facilities
- Stations: 2 (plus 1 mobile)

Website
- https://www.hillsboro-oregon.gov/our-city/departments/police

The Hillsboro Police Department (HPD) is the municipal law enforcement agency of the city of Hillsboro, Oregon, United States. It is a regionally accredited agency with 127 sworn officers on the force. The chief is Jim Coleman in a city of over 110,000 residents west of Portland, Oregon, in Washington County. With 169 employees as of 2014, the department is the second largest police force in the county and seventh largest in Oregon.

== History ==
The Hillsboro Police Department grew to five employees in 1947, and expanded to 31 employees by 1976. In 1980, officer Gerald H. Erickson became the only officer in the department to die in the line of duty. The department hired Ron Louie as chief of police in 1992. The department had grown to 54 sworn officers in 1994.

In 1995, Hillsboro police partnered with the Federal Bureau of Investigation (FBI) and Intel Corporation to start the Oregon High-Tech Crime Team to investigate and prosecute computer based crimes. Intel donated $100,000 to the program. By 1999, the department had seven officers assigned to the team. In 2003, the unit was dissolved after 93 arrests and the recovery of $208 million, after private funding ended and a new FBI lab was opened.

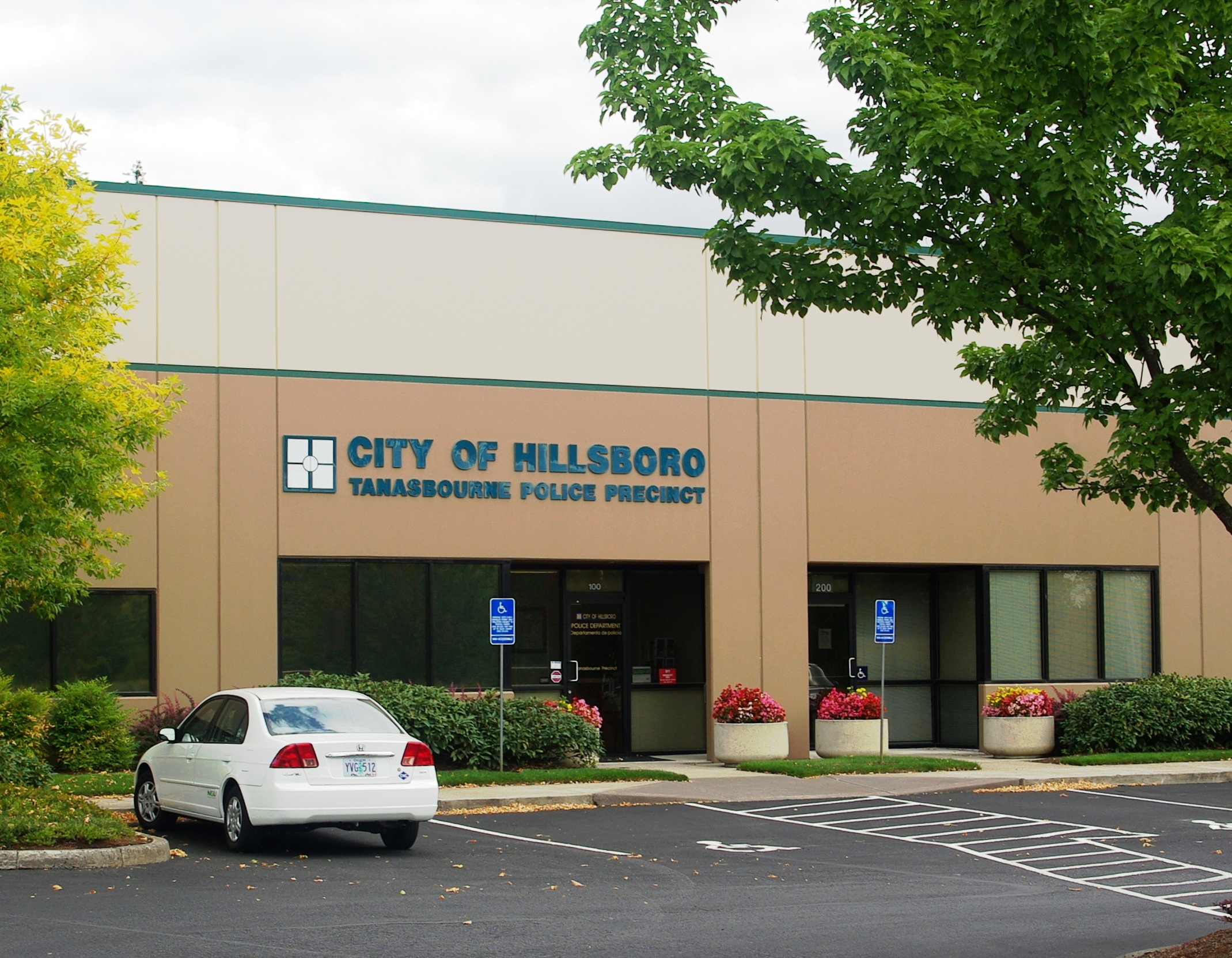
Tanasbourne precinct along Cornell Road in eastern Hillsboro

The department became the first police agency in Oregon to collect racial information from traffic stops in May 2000. The information was collected to train officers to not target minority groups. Hillsboro PD examines the data monthly to analyze any numbers that appear disproportionate to Census data. By 2001, the department offered increased pay for officers who could speak Spanish. In 2006, police chief Ron Louie and one other officer were appointed to a six-person, statewide task force to analyze racial profiling along with the American Civil Liberties Union’s top person in the state, and former Oregon Supreme Court justice Edwin J. Peterson.

The department established a mediation program in 1997. That program reached its goal of providing 32 hours of formal training for its entire workforce, becoming the first law enforcement agency in the United States accomplish this task. HPD has documented that mediation can lead to fewer repeat calls to police from those involved in disputes. The department purchased a closed Albertson's grocery store for $2.6 million in January 2001. The building was remodeled and became the new main precinct.

The February 2001 Nisqually earthquake temporarily closed the police headquarters in downtown, but re-opened the same day after the damage to the old brick building was determined to be cosmetic and not structural. In December 2001, the department took issue with the appropriateness of some of the questions in the United States Department of Justice’s anti-terrorism interviews that followed the September 11 attacks. HPD became nationally accredited in 2004 by the Commission on Accreditation for Law Enforcement Agencies (CALEA), and regionally accredited in 2008 by the Oregon Accreditation Alliance. The agency remained CALEA accredited until 2007.

In 2003 officer Lila Ashenbrenner became the first woman in the department with a command position. At that time women made up 19% of the 106 officer force. On July 2, 2007, Ashenbrenner would become the departments first female chief of police when Louie retired. Prior chiefs of police include M. E. DeRock (1947–77), Herman Woll (1977-1991), Ron Louie (1992-2007), Lila Ashenbrenner (2007-2010), Carey Sullivan (2010-2014), and Lee Dobrowolski (2014 - current)

In 1997, a police dog on the force was shot and killed in the line of duty, and in 2007 Hondo Dog Park was built by the city and named in the dog's honor. The department's Life Intervention program for fighting truancy in schools was named a finalist an award by the International Association of Chiefs of Police in 2009. Carey Sullivan served as chief from July 2010 to March 2013, with former chief Ron Louie serving as interim chief. The city hired Lee Dobrowolski as the new chief, taking office in February 2014. The department, in conjunction with the Fire Department, announced a joint training facility would be built near Hillsboro Stadium.

== Operations ==
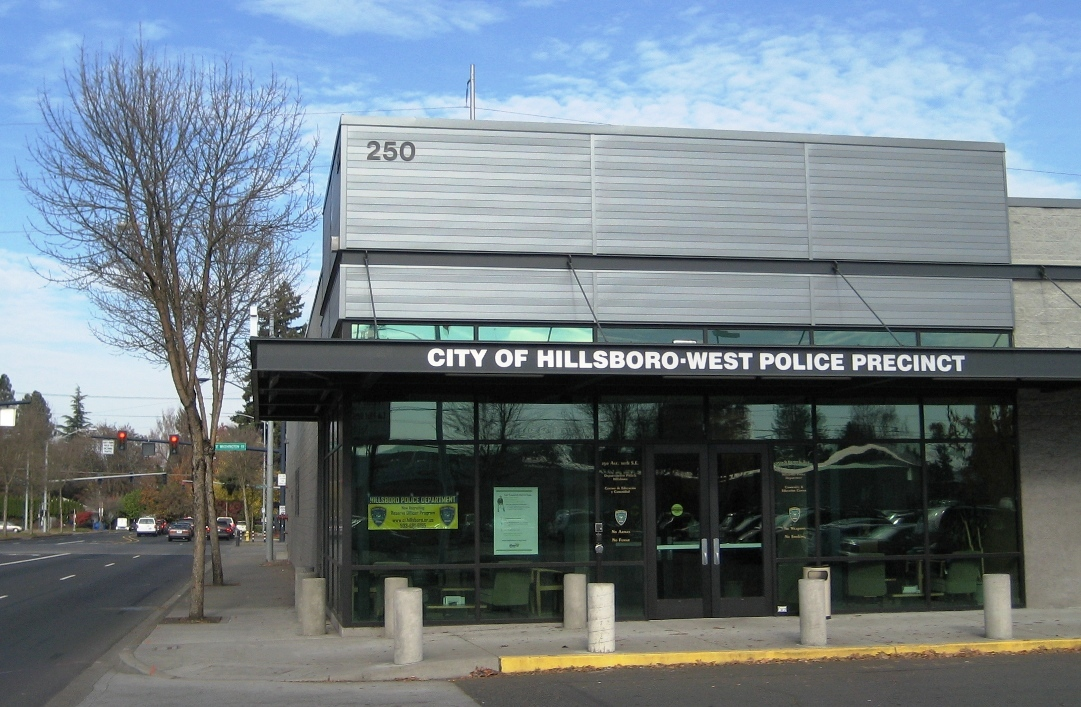
West Precinct along 10th Avenue near the Tualatin Valley Highway

HPD operates two stations, a West Precinct located in downtown on 10th Street near the Washington/Southeast 12th Avenue MAX Station. The Tanasbourne Precinct is located in the Tanasbourne neighborhood on the city's eastside. Divisions include a patrol unit, detectives, emergency response team created in 1993, K-9 units, reserve units, and a Citizen's Enhancement Team, among others. The department utilizes automobiles, motorcycles, and bicycles in its enforcement mission. Some detectives and staff drive hybrid vehicles, as HPD's part in helping the City of Hillsboro go "green."

The department employs non-lethal weapons such as a special launcher that fires paintball-like pepper balls to incapacitate suspects. To reduce repeat calls for service, the department utilizes a mediation program that trains every member of the department. The department also utilizes police cadets to perform tasks that may otherwise take up the time of full-time officers. These tasks include participating in community events, traffic details, officer ride-a-longs, and graffiti cleanup.

== Misconduct ==
In 2020, Jean Coppedge filed a civil complaint against the City of Hillsboro in state court claiming that the police department conducted a biased investigation in 2019 that violated her due process and civil rights. The Hillsboro Police Department reviewed body camera footage of the incident and concluded that the officers responded appropriately. Despite Hillsboro not conceding any wrongdoing in the incident, a $90,000 settlement was awarded to Coppedge after U.S. Magistrate Judge Youlee Yim You largely sided with her discrimination arguments.

In 2021, Cindy Young Bolek was placed on leave allegedly as retaliation for her part in reviewing the Jean Coppedge body camera footage. After her review, Young Bolek brought concerns to department leadership and later city officials that the officers involved violated the law and department policies. She contacted Washington County District Attorney Kevin Barton in a self-described act of whistleblowing, where she described a lack of basic oversight in the use of body cameras in the Hillsboro Police Department. In an internal review, Hillsboro Police stated that 90% of incidents follow proper protocol for the use of body cameras.

In 2022, text messages revealed as part of court filing show Hillsboro Police Department Detective Rebecca Venable and Washington County Deputy District Attorney John Gerhard arranging plans to have "a Mexican themed party to celebrate the convictions of Mexican defendants". Evidence of the conversation was used to argue that Venable’s actions show bias against Hispanic people and her bias could have influenced her actions and testimony in a 2018 murder case involving a Hispanic man. The Hillsboro Police Department spokesperson said that they do not believe Venable's text messages violated any policy.

== See also ==
- List of law enforcement agencies in Oregon
- Hillsboro Civic Center
