= Cornell Creek Park =

Park in Oregon, United States

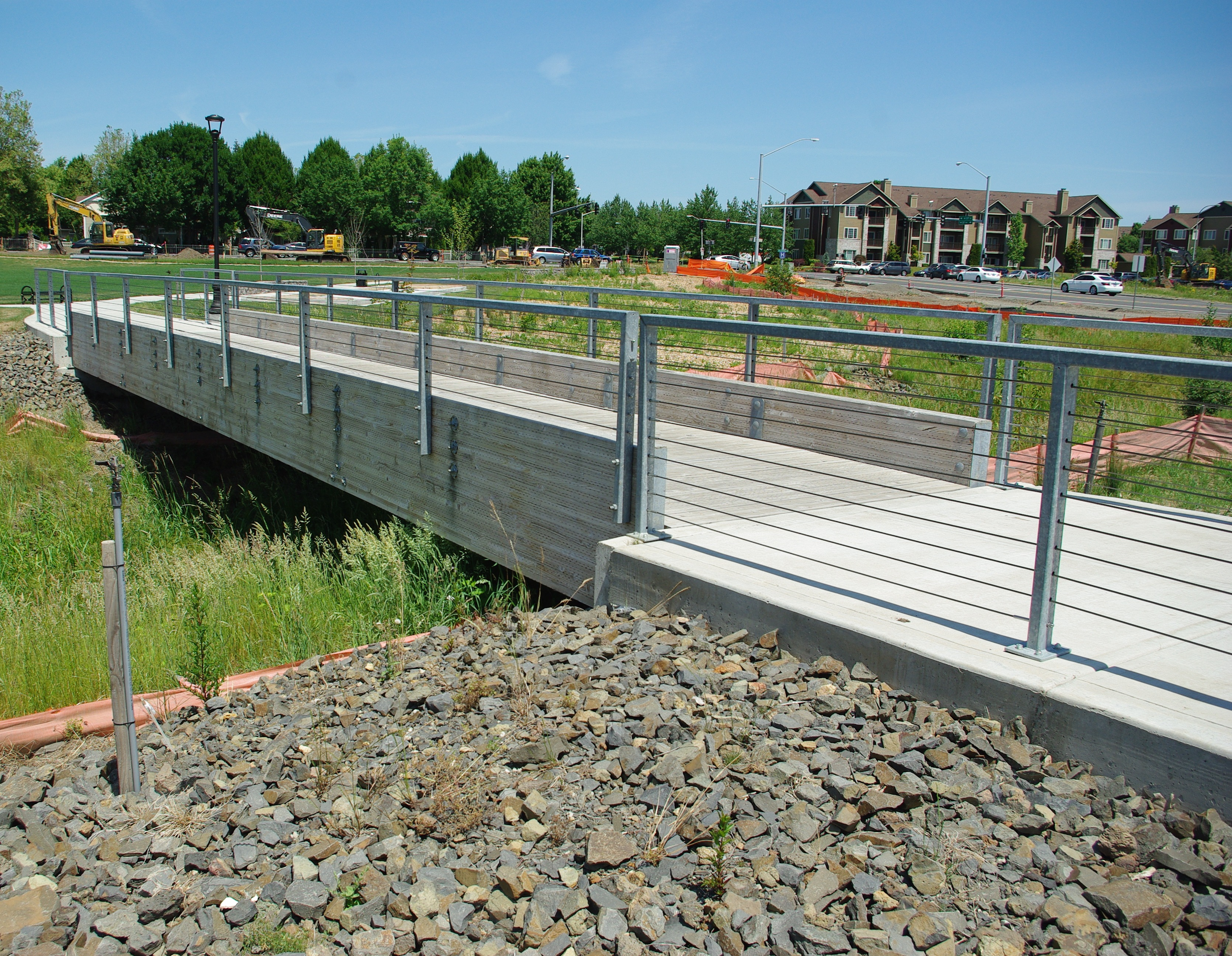
- Bridge over the creek in the park
- Interactive map of Cornell Creek Park
- Type: Public, city
- Location: Hillsboro, Oregon, United States
- Coordinates: 45.5336256°N 122.913057°W
- Area: 4.19 acres (17,000 m^{2})
- Created: 2016
- Operator: Hillsboro Parks & Recreation Department
- Status: Day use only
- Public transit: Orenco; 48
- Website: hillsboro-oregon.gov

Cornell Creek Park is a city park in Hillsboro, Oregon, United States. Opened in 2016, it has the second dog park in the city after Hondo Dog Park. Located in the Orenco Station neighborhood along Cornell Road, it has just over four acres that is bisected by a small creek.

== History ==
Plans for a park at the corner of Cornell Road and NW 231st Avenue (since renamed Century Blvd) were announced in 2014. At the time, the park was planned to open in the fall of 2015. The park was part of the broader Platform District developments near the Orenco Station MAX stop that included the Orenco Station Plaza. Construction on the park began in 2014, and was planned to have an off-leash dog area, a bocce court, a footbridge bridge, walking paths, and a ping-pong table, but no parking. The off-leash dog area opened in 2015, with the rest of the park opening in 2016. The land for the park was given to the city by Holland Partner Group, who built the Platform District, in exchange for system development credits, and the park was built for approximately $825,000.

== Amenities ==
The park is split into two sections by a driveway to a condo development. The southern portion contains the off-leash dog area that is fenced. Other features of the park include a play area, a bocce court, walking paths, picnic tables, an outdoor ping pong table, and a foot bridge over the small, unnamed creek.

Cornell Creek Park is located at the southwest corner of Cornell Road and Century Blvd in the northeastern portion of Hillsboro. It is across Century Blvd Sonrise Church and Tessera apartments. The MAX station and Platform District are to the west and south.

== See also ==
- Noble Woods Park
