= Cottage Grove Police Department (Oregon) =

Coordinates: 43.79751°N 123.06376°W

- Abbreviation: CGPD

Jurisdictional structure
- Operations jurisdiction: Cottage Grove, Oregon, USA
- Area: 3.3 sq mi (8.6 km2)
- Population: 9,345
- General nature: Local civilian police

Operational structure
- Headquarters: Cottage Grove, Oregon
- Police Officers: 35
- Agency executive: Cory Chase, Chief of Police

Facilities
- Stations: Cottage Grove City Hall Station

Website
- http://www.cgpolice.org/

The Cottage Grove Police Department serves the residents of Cottage Grove, Oregon. They respond to 9-1-1 calls within Cottage Grove. The current chief of police is chief Cory Chase.

== Controversy ==
=== Kim Graham child pornography case ===
On April 20, 2010, a former Cottage Grove Police Department police officer, Kim Scott Graham, was convicted for possession of child pornography. He was sentenced to 60 months in prison. A search warrant was executed by the Federal Bureau of Investigation at Graham's residence on March 6, 2009. Graham was still a police officer employed by CGPD when the warrant was served.

Graham plead guilty to the charge, and admitted that over a 5 year period he possessed in excess of 600 child pornography images.

== See also ==
- List of law enforcement agencies in Oregon
