= Hare Field =

Sports facility in Hillsboro, Oregon

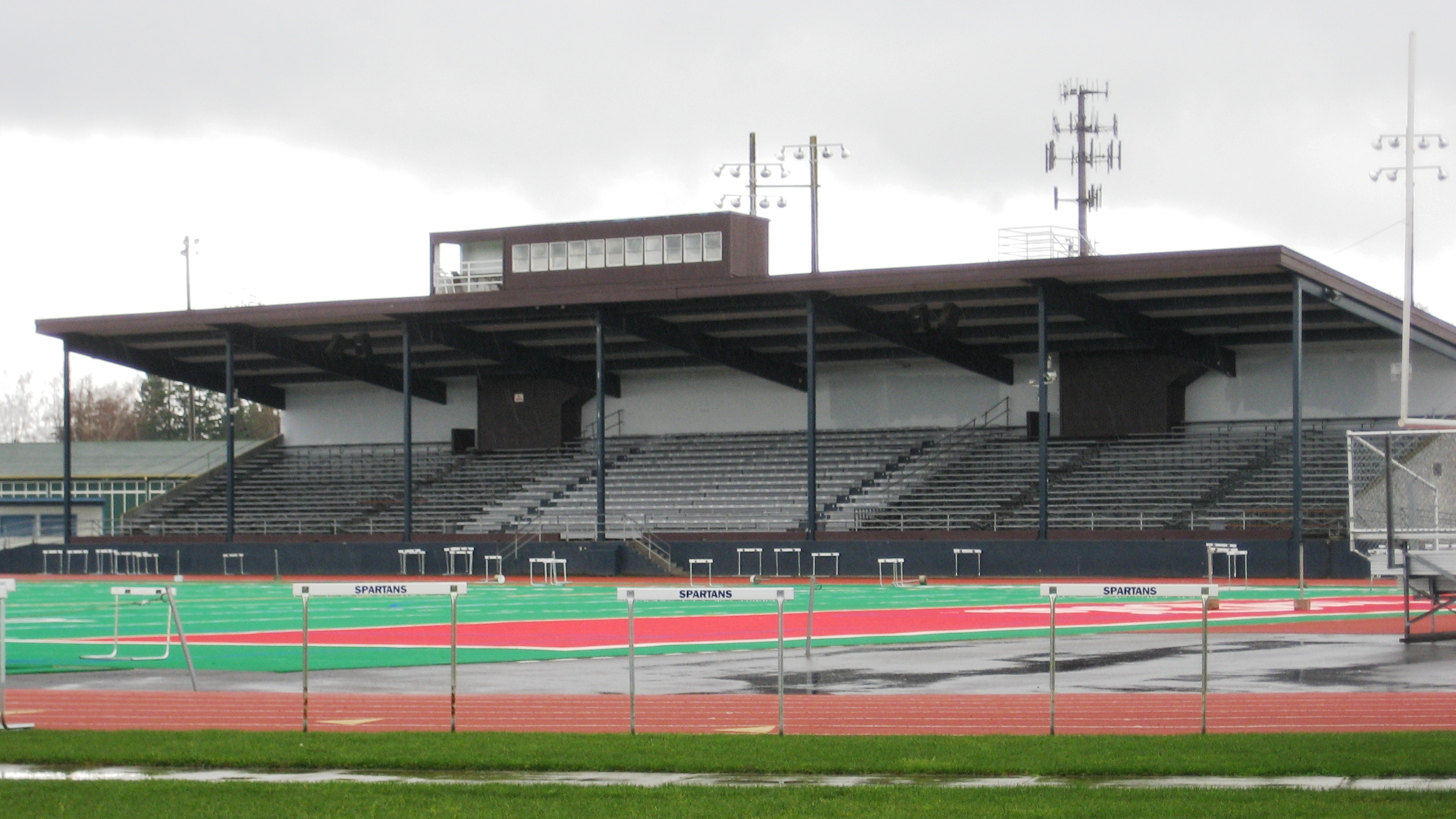
- Interactive map of Hare Field
- Location: 1147 NE Grant Street; Hillsboro, Oregon, 97124
- Coordinates: 45.528779°N 122.973361°W
- Owner: Hillsboro School District
- Capacity: 5,000+
- Surface: Field turf

Construction
- Opened: 1965
- Renovated: 1997

Tenants
- Hillsboro High School (1965-Present); Glencoe High School (1980-Present) (OSSA) Men's State Football Tournament (1999-2001) partial schedule Century High School (1997-1999)

Hare Field is a multi-sport facility located in Hillsboro, Oregon, United States. The facility opened in 1965 and is owned by the Hillsboro School District. Hare Field includes a baseball stadium, a football stadium, practice fields, and track and field equipment. The venue hosts high school sports, open track meets, youth sports, and occasionally college sports. The football stadium seats over 5,000 fans, was the first high school field in Oregon with an all-weather field, and was named one of the best venues to watch high school football in the state.

== History ==
Hare Field opened in 1965 when the Hillsboro High School (Hilhi Spartans) baseball team started using the baseball stadium. The field was named for civic leader and former state legislator William G. Hare. The first football game was held on September 9, 1966, when Hilhi played Gresham High School. Hilhi won that game 7-0 and would become the season’s state champions. From 1948 to 1965 school football teams had used Goodman Field, located on the north side of NE Lincoln Street to the east of the high school building (later J.B. Thomas Middle School). With the addition of Glencoe High School in 1980, that school also began using the facilities at Hare Field.

In 1991, coach Rich Brooks held the Oregon Ducks spring scrimmage at the stadium drawing 5,183 spectators. The football stadium was used in 1997 for a memorial service to Hondo, a police dog killed in the line of duty and namesake for the city’s dog park. Century High School became the third school to use Hare Field in 1997, but moved to the new Hillsboro Stadium when it opened in 1999.

The following year, the facility began a multi-year renovation that was funded by private money, including a controversial deal with soft drink maker Coca-Cola that raised $1 million. The total cost for the project were $3.5 million and included the installation of an all-weather surface for the football and soccer field, a new track surface, locker-room improvements, and upgrades to some seating areas among others. As a result of the sponsorships, the artificial turf has Coca-Cola logos in both end zones, and it became the first all-weather high school football field in Oregon. Following the installation of AstroTurf in 1998, the facility was used to host OSAA state playoff games that year.

Hare Field hosted the Oregon State Beavers football spring game in 1999, the first year under coach Dennis Erickson. In 2003, The Oregonian newspaper named the football stadium as one of the ten best places to watch a high school football game. The Hilhi versus Glencoe football series was selected in 2007 for the Great American Rivalry Series. The all-weather playing surface was scheduled to be replaced with a new all-weather field in 2009. Hilhi boosters began renovations to the baseball diamond (Ad Rutschman Stadium) in 2014, which were completed in 2015.

== Facilities ==
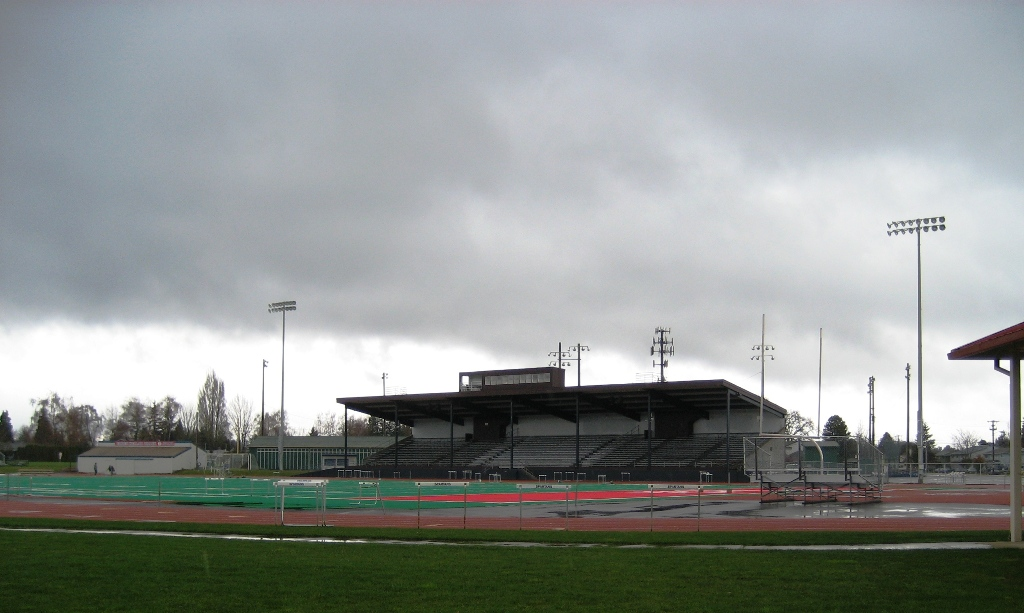
Main grandstand from west with football field in foreground

Hare Field consists of Craig Ruecker (football) Stadium that includes locker rooms and a covered grandstand. The football field is also used for soccer, and a track surrounds the field. Other track equipment and open fields also make up the western section of the facility. The track is named the Elden Kellar Track. On the east side of the complex is Ad Rutschman Baseball Stadium, with a portion of the south part composed of ticket stands and paved parking. There is a jogging track around the perimeter of the complex.

The complex hosts home football games for both Glencoe and Hilhi, along with home soccer games for Glencoe and home track meets for Hilhi. Oregon School Activities Association state playoff games for football are also held at the stadium. Hilhi uses the baseball diamond for their teams. Hare is also home to the annual Elden Kellar Invitational amateur track meet, while occasionally hosting high school district championship meets. A weekly all-comers track meet is held during the summers.

In addition to athletic venues, Hare Field houses and hosts other items and events. The facility serves as the staging ground for parades such as the annual St. Patrick’s Day Parade and the annual Fourth of July Parade. Hare Field’s grounds also house an air quality monitoring station owned by the Oregon Department of Environmental Quality. The school district also receives revenues from a cellular phone communication tower located at the site.

== Glencoe-Hillsboro rivalry (Battle of the Boro Rivalry Series) ==
Since opening in 1980, Glencoe High School has maintained a close rivalry with cross-town Hillsboro High School (Hilhi) with a football game taking place nearly every year between Glencoe and Hilhi. The rivalry has been featured on the Great American Rivalry series presented by the US Marine Corps. Glencoe has won 30 Battle of the Boro rivalry games, while Hilhi has won eleven.

In the 2016 and 2017 seasons, Glencoe Football played on an independent schedule, meaning they had no control over their game schedule. This resulted in a brief pause on the annual rivalry games. The rivalry series was again paused in 2020 as a result of the COVID-19 pandemic.

As both schools are tenants of Hare Field for football, the winning school gets to call Hare Field "their home field."

Scores from each game

- 1980: No rivalry game
- 1981: Hilhi 10-7
- 1982: Glencoe 13-7
- 1983: Hilhi 7-6
- 1984: Glencoe 23-0
- 1985: Hilhi 23-0
- 1986: Glencoe 41-8
- 1987: Glencoe 34-6
- 1988: Glencoe 17-7
- 1989: Glencoe 27-20
- 1990: Glencoe 15-12
- 1991: Glencoe 21-7
- 1992: Glencoe 35-14
- 1993: Hilhi 35-27
- 1994: Glencoe 23-9
- 1995: Glencoe 42-21
- 1996: Glencoe 27-18
- 1997: Glencoe 20-6
- 1998: Glencoe 42-20
- 1999: Glencoe 49-21
- 2000: Hilhi 22-21 (overtime)
- 2001: Glencoe 34-6
- 2002: Glencoe 30-28
- 2003: Glencoe 51-45 (overtime)
- 2004: Glencoe 27-21
- 2005: Glencoe 14-6
- 2006: Hilhi 21-17
- 2007: Glencoe 48-13
- 2008: Hilhi 24-7
- 2009: Hilhi 26-22
- 2010: Hilhi 39-21
- 2011: Glencoe 33-14
- 2012: Glencoe 50-7
- 2013: Glencoe 49-22
- 2014: Hilhi 49-28
- 2015: Hilhi 49-21
- 2016: No rivalry game
- 2017: No rivalry game
- 2018: Glencoe 38-14
- 2019: Glencoe 14-7
- 2020: No rivalry game
- 2021: Glencoe 35-0
- 2022: Glencoe 41-18
- 2023: Glencoe 42-14
- 2024: Glencoe 35-0

== See also ==
- List of sports venues in Portland, Oregon
