= Ashland Police Department (Oregon) =

- Abbreviation: APD
- Motto: Excellence Through Partnerships

Jurisdictional structure
- Operations jurisdiction: Ashland, Oregon, USA
- General nature: Local civilian police

Operational structure
- Headquarters: Ashland, Oregon
- Police Officers: 24
- Agency executive: Terry Holderness, Chief of Police

Website
- APD Website

The Ashland Police Department (APD) is the law enforcement agency for the city of Ashland, Oregon, United States.

== History ==
In 2018 an Ashland Police trainee was fired. The trainee later stated he was fired for being a whistleblower.

In 2019, the Ashland Police arrested an Oregon Shakespeare Festival actor. In 2021 the ACLU sued on his behalf, noting issues of racist bias and stating his civil rights were violated, as he was arrested without probable cause and handcuffed to a floor grate in a jail cell. When the head of the Oregon Shakespeare Festival, a woman of color, received death threats in 2022, she received private protection rather than work through the police department, citing the 2019 arrest. The mayor condemned the threats and supported the OSF leader.

== See also ==
- List of law enforcement agencies in Oregon
