= Jackson Bottom Wetlands Preserve =

Protected area of Oregon, US

- IUCN category IV (habitat/species management area)
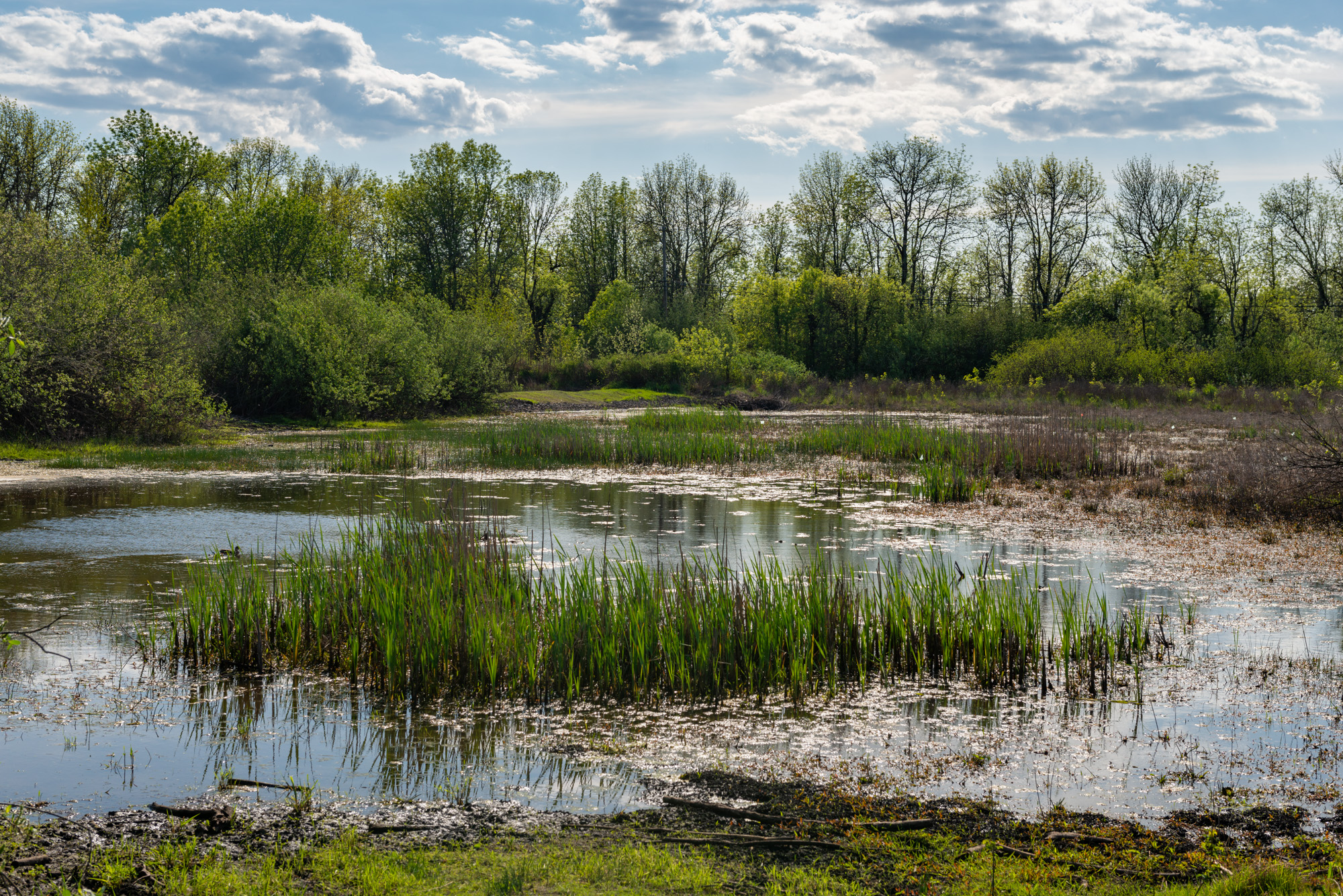

- Location within the United States
- Location: Hillsboro, Oregon, US
- Coordinates: 45°30′17″N 122°59′24″W
- Area: 635 acres (257 ha)
- Visitors: 25,000 (in 2005)
- Governing body: City of Hillsboro
- Website: hillsboro-oregon.gov

Jackson Bottom Wetlands Preserve in Hillsboro, Oregon, United States, is a 635-acre (257 ha) wetlands area along the Tualatin River in Washington County, Oregon. Located on the south end of the city along Highway 219, this lowland area is a designated Important Bird Area and hosts such birds as buffleheads, dusky Canada geese, and tundra swans.

== History ==
The Atfalati band of the Kalapuya people, who were the first inhabitants of the area, hunted and gathered in the area including hunting waterfowl and digging up camas roots. Then when European pioneers settled the area beginning in the 1830s farms were established in the area, with the wetlands area usually not being used due to the annual flooding. However, bridges were built across the river and steamboats plied the river before the railroads came to the valley.

In 1910 the city of Hillsboro began using the Jackson Bottom area for water waste disposal. By the 1930s farmers in the community protested the water pollution that resulted from waste dumping into the river. Then in 1939 the city purchased part of the area and began using it as a sewer farm that produced a variety of produce and the city made some money off the venture. By the 1970s the city had acquired most of the land in that area, stopped using the farm, and let the area become grassland. Next, in 1980 the Jackson Bottom Coordinated Resource Management Plan was developed and the area was transformed into a wetlands area. In 1999, the wetlands received a National Wetlands Award for Education and Outreach from the Environmental Law Institute. Cougar sightings in June 2014 closed trails on several occasions.

== Features ==
This area contains forest areas along the river bank, a forested wetland area, ponds, marshes, meadows, slough areas, and a forest section of mixed deciduous and conifer trees. Jackson Bottom is home to a diverse group of plant and animal species. Animals that call the wetlands home include beavers, minks, nutria, ducks, blue and green herons, warblers, frogs, owls, red-tailed hawks, woodpeckers, opossums, deer, raccoons, newts, sparrows, finch, coyotes, and many other small rodents, birds, and reptiles. Migratory waterfowl include northern pintails, canvasbacks, blue-winged teal, green-winged teal, dusky Canada geese, and tundra swans. Plant life there includes dogwood trees, Douglas fir, white oak, cocklebur, Columbia River sedge, red willow, Oregon ash, and other grass and tree species.

Human oriented features of Jackson Bottom include hiking trails, an education center, environmental monitoring and research, and bird watching.

== Wetlands Nature Center ==
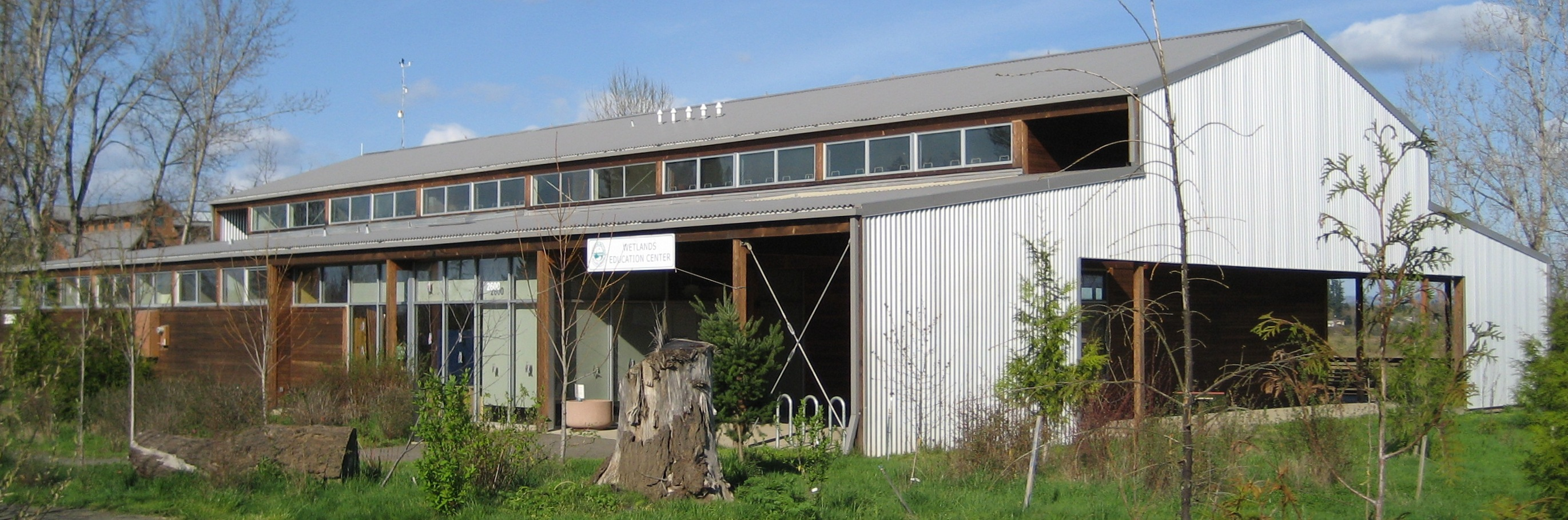
Education Center at Jackson Bottom

On September 27, 2003, the Wetlands Education Center opened at Jackson Bottom. The 12,000-square-foot (1,100 m^{2}) building is used to educate visitors of the wetlands and includes an exterior 3,000-square-foot (300 m^{2}) deck that wraps around the structure. This building houses a classroom, nature store, and exhibits.

In January 2007 the Nature center received a new natural exhibit piece. Inside the building is an intact bald eagle nest. This 7-by-11-foot (2.1 by 3.4 m), 1,500 pound nest is believed to be the only intact nest on display in the United States. The nest was built in 2001 by an eagle family along the Tualatin River and removed in 2005 when the tree it was built on began falling down. Inside the nest are the remains of the animals the eagles dined on including fish and other birds.

With a grant from Intel, the Nature Center hosts a Capricorn Weather Station with meteorological data available to the public via Weather Underground and widgets on their website.

Jackson Bottom also conducts many education programs in cooperation with local schools, operates summer camp programs, and has a teacher education program. These are all designed to increase knowledge about wetlands, water resources, and preservation of the natural environment.

== See also ==
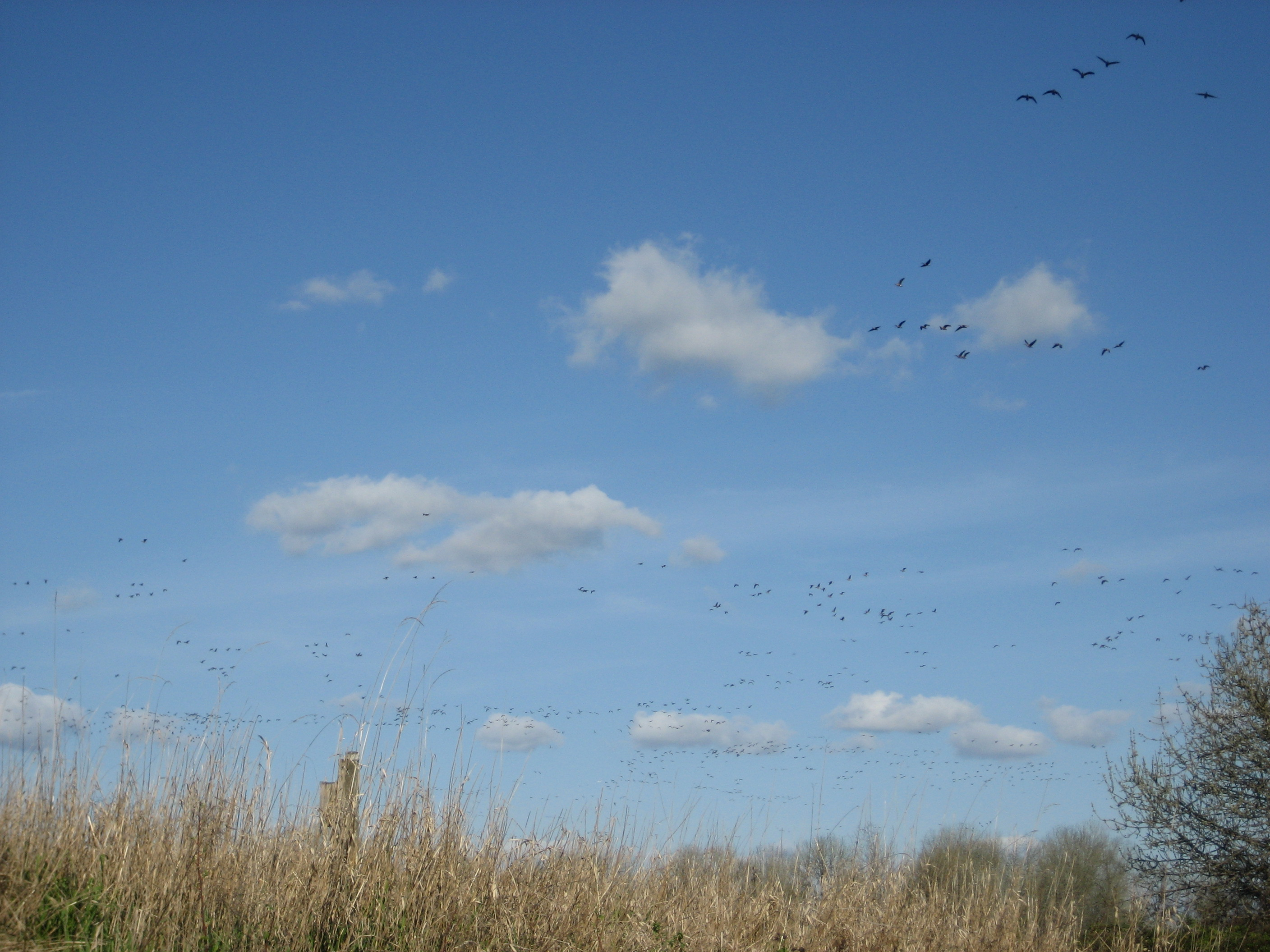
Migratory waterfowl at Jackson Bottom

- Noble Woods Park
- Tualatin River National Wildlife Refuge
