= Shute Park Plaza =

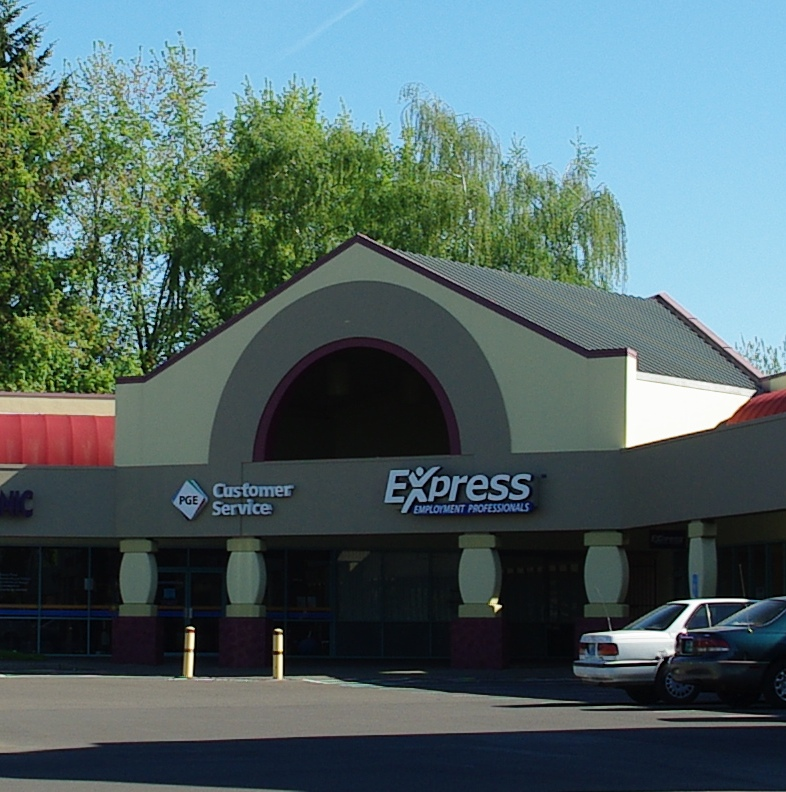
- Central part of the main building
- Location: Hillsboro, Oregon, United States
- Coordinates: 45.51256°N 122.971716°W
- Address: 1001 SE TV Highway
- Opened: 1985
- Developer: Hayden Corp.
- Owner: Shute Park Plaza LLC
- Architect: David Hickman Associates
- Num. of stores: 18
- Num. of anchor tenants: 2
- Floor area: 362,874 square feet (33,712.1 m^{2}) (GLA)
- Floors: 1

Shute Park Plaza is a shopping center located in Hillsboro, Oregon, United States. Situated along Tualatin Valley Highway, the 18-tenant center takes its name from Shute Park, which is located across the highway. The land the mall sits on was once part of the park, housing a baseball diamond. Shute Park Plaza opened in 1985 at a cost of $6 million.

== History ==
The land that became Shute Park Plaza was sold to the city in 1906 by banker John W. Shute to become Hillsboro's first park. In 1972, the city decided to re-zone a 5.5-acre (2.2 ha) section of the park in order to maximize the value of the land in preparations to sell that section. That section was located across Tualatin Valley Highway and contained a baseball field that had hosted home games for Hillsboro High School until 1965. Due to being physically separated from the other section of the park, the park's department wanted to sell off the land in order to pay for improvements at other park facilities in the city.

The 5-acre (2.0 ha) parcel was eventually sold in 1978 to Howard Davis, a former mayor, and Howard Glesmann for $250,000, with the funds planned to be used for city-owned facilities at the Washington County Fairgrounds. However, the city also accidentally sold off a small section from the other side of the highway, which was re-sold to the city shortly thereafter. That 10,454.4-square-foot (971.25 m^{2}) plot was sold to the city for $51,400, which led to an investigation by the county district attorney in 1981. The district attorney declined to take action, though the City Council cited city manager Eldon Mills and his staff for negligence in the matter. Eventually the land was sold to developers to build a shopping center.

A groundbreaking ceremony for the new $6 million center was held on May 29, 1985, for the 60,000-square-foot (5,600 m^{2}) shopping center on site of the former baseball field, with Hillsboro mayor Shirley Huffman officiating. At that time, it was expected to open in October 1985 with 25 to 30 tenants. The center was developed by Hayden Corp. and designed by David Hickman Associates. The L-shaped building was originally to include freestanding pads for a bank and a fast food restaurant. Construction also included adding a traffic signal on Tualatin Valley Highway.

Oak Unlimited opened at the center in 1986, as did Pro Am Sports. Izzy's Pizza built a stand-alone restaurant at the center in 1987. In 1996, owner WCB Properties nearly sold the plaza along with five other of its properties to ScanlanKemperBard Companies. The next year, WCB sold Shute Park Plaza as part of a series of sales to Spieker Properties worth a total of $123 million, with Spieker then selling the plaza to Pan Pacific Retail Properties in February 1998. Pan Pacific's purchase was for $30.4 million and included four shopping centers total in Oregon.

Pan Pacific sold the shopping center in September 2002 to Shute Park Plaza Partners LLC for $6.3 million. The new ownership company was owned by Martin Kehoe. Also in 2002, La Boutique opened in the plaza, selling quinceañeras in the Hispanic neighborhood. In 2005, ownership of the center was transferred to Shute Park Plaza LLC for $8.5 million. Black Rock Coffee Bar opened a drive-thru kiosk at Shute Park in 2011.

== Details ==
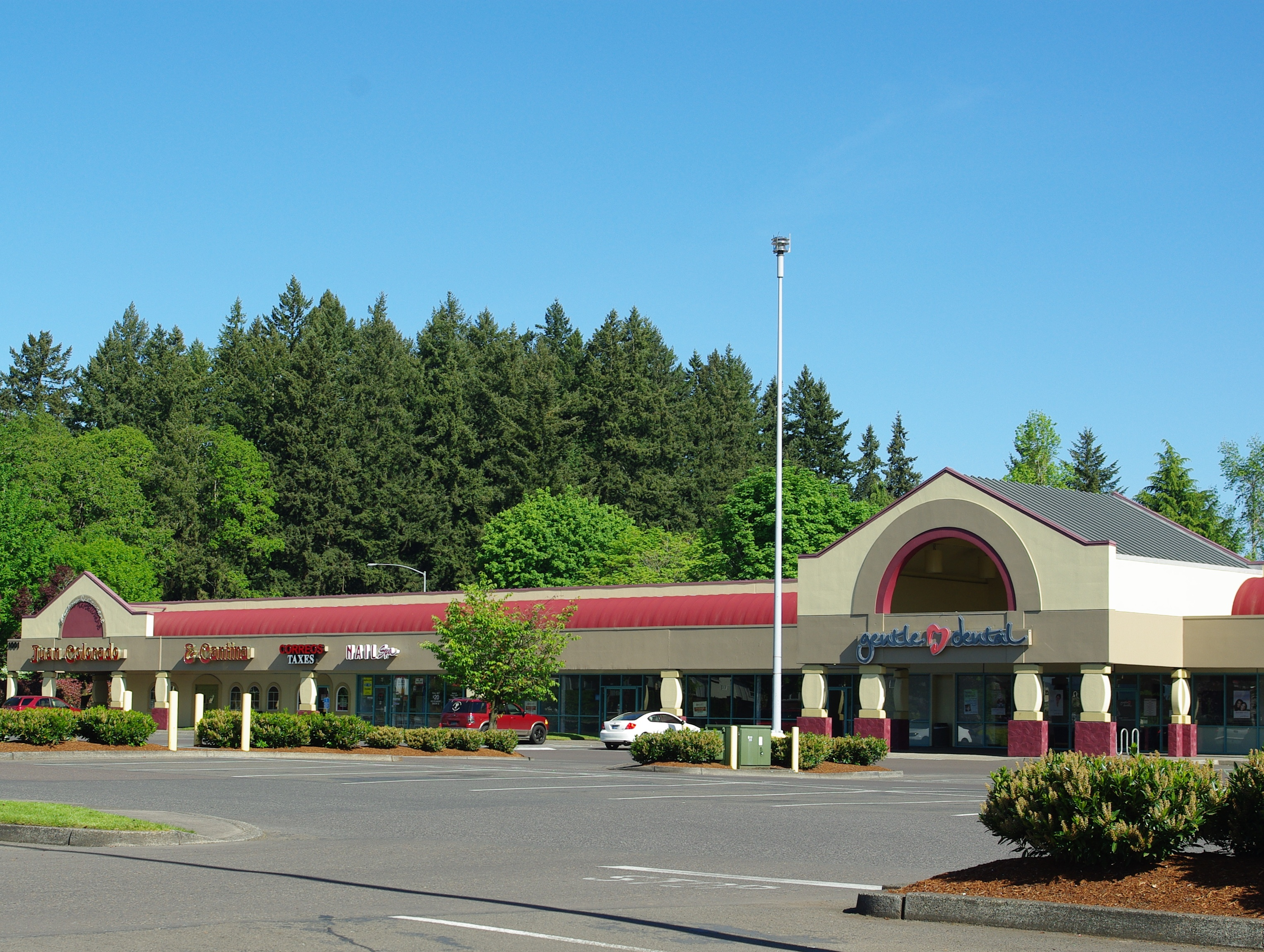
Western portion of the shopping center

Shute Park Plaza is located along Tualatin Valley Highway in the southeast part of Hillsboro, across from Shute Park at the point where the highway curves to become Tenth Avenue. The main building is an 'L' shape, which has 58,560 square feet (5,440 m^{2}) of gross leasable area. Additionally, there are two restaurant pads along the TV Highway frontage. The originally $6 million center is anchored by Izzy's and Baxter Auto Parts. Other tenants include restaurants, retail shops, and professional offices.

== See also ==
- List of shopping malls in Oregon
