= Campus law enforcement in Oregon =

In the U.S. state of Oregon, enforcement of local, state, and federal law on public university property is delegated to a number of security, public safety, and police agencies.

Public institutions in Oregon may elect to form campus police. The University of Oregon, Oregon Health & Science University, Oregon State University, and Portland State University have police departments. Other universities employ Public Safety Officers (with limited police powers) and security officers, or contract with other police agencies to provide services.

== Statutory authority and training ==
=== Authority ===
Senate Bill 405, passed into law on June 23, 2011, states: "The State Board of Higher Education may, at the request of a public institution under its control, authorize the institution to establish a police department and commission one or more employees as police officers. A police department established under this section has all of the authority and immunity of a municipal police department of this state."

OHSU Police patch

Oregon Revised Statutes (ORS) 352.385 provides for the commissioning and training of Special Campus Security Officers at Oregon's public universities. These officers are given probable cause arrest authority and "Stop and Frisk" authority under Oregon law. However, they are excluded from the definition of "police" or "peace officer" for the purposes of some Oregon statutes.

ORS 353.050 provides for similar commissioning of officers at Oregon Health and Science University (OHSU). OHSU's officers are statutorily known as University Police Officers, carry firearms, and are considered police for all Oregon statutes. OHSU Police Officer's attend the Basic Police Academy in Salem, Oregon. OHSU Police is the primary law enforcement agency for the jurisdictional boundaries of the Marquam Hill and South Waterfront Campuses.

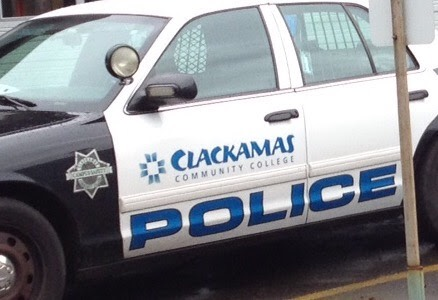

=== Cooperative agreements and mutual aid ===
All of Oregon's campus agencies have formal or informal mutual aid agreements with local police agencies.

Several campuses have chosen to formally contract police services to supplement the work of their Public Safety Officers. Oregon State University has a contracted detachment of the Oregon State Police on campus, while the University of Oregon, Oregon Health & Science University and the Portland State University have established independent campus police departments.

== University of Oregon Police Department ==
University of Oregon Police Department
- Patches of The University of Oregon Police Department.

- Badges of the University of Oregon Police Department.
- Abbreviation: UOPD

Jurisdictional structure
- Operations jurisdiction: Oregon, U.S.
- Area: 345,880
- Population: Over 30,000
- Legal jurisdiction: State of Oregon
- Primary governing body: University of Oregon
- Secondary governing body: Oregon University System
- General nature: Civilian police

Operational structure
- Headquarters: West Station: 1319 E 15th Ave Eugene, OR 97403 & East Station: 2141 E 15th Ave Eugene, OR 97403
- Police Officers: 90+ total staff
- Agency executive: Jason Wade, Chief
- Parent agency: University of Oregon

Website
- police.uoregon.edu

The University of Oregon Police Department is the law enforcement agency for the University of Oregon in Eugene, Oregon, United States. The department has state police powers to enforce all state laws and university rules, with primary jurisdiction involving the University of Oregon campus. UOPD has more than 50 staff and is increasing in size along with the rapidly growing university, which currently has over 23,000 students.

=== Statutory authority and training ===
==== Authority ====
Effective June 23, 2011, the State of Oregon legislature approved a bill allowing public universities within the state to create their own police forces. Prior to this legislation, limited authority "public safety departments" were the only option for universities in Oregon. With the new legislation public universities may govern over full powered police agencies to protect university property and surrounding areas. On June 21, 2013, the Oregon State Board of Higher Education voted to allow UOPD officer to carry firearms on duty. The officers had previously been required to be trained and certified to use firearms, but were not permitted to carry on the job. The ability to carry firearms allows the department to respond to all calls, and require less assistance from other area police agencies.

==== About the Department ====
UOPD operates from two different stations located on the University of Oregon campus. The department works with Eugene Police Department officers, making a partnership between the two agencies. Officers are on-duty 365 days a year and provide immediate response to all types of calls for service to include emergency situations and critical incidents.

Department Structure

- Office of the Chief and Executive Director
- Patrol Team
- Office of Administration
- Office of Physical Security

Ranks & Personnel

Title	Insignia	Personnel
Chief		Jason Wade
Captain		Don Morris, Clint Dieball
Sergeant		Scott Clark, Jared Davis, Bo Macovis, Chris Phillips, Kevin Kimmel
Detective		Geri Brooks
Corporal		Steven Barrett, Adam Lillengreen, Josh Nascimento, Chris Waggoner

Campuses

- Main Campus
- Oregon Institute of Marine Biology
- University of Oregon Portland Campus.
- Pine Mountain Observatory

==== Campus Patrol ====
The university and surrounding neighborhood is patrolled by UOPD Officers regularly throughout both day and night.

Bicycle Patrols

Bicycles provide a quick response to emergencies while patrolling campus because of their ability to maneuver through pedestrian traffic and areas that vehicles can't easily reach.

Foot Patrols

UOPD Officers and Community Service Officers conduct regular foot patrols in buildings and around campus, daily. The focus of these patrols is building security, personal safety of students and staff, and to maintain an active presence throughout the campus to deter crime.

Vehicle Patrols

Officers in vehicles patrol campus parking lots and streets throughout the day and night. UOPD utilizes marked and unmarked cars, as well as trucks and ATVs.

Special Event Patrols

University of Oregon Police focuses its efforts on providing a safe and secure environment to all patrons at University of Oregon Duck football games and other Pac-12 athletic events. During the November 6, 2010, UO vs. University of Washington football game 117 patrons were ejected from the venue, the majority for alcohol violations and or disorderly conduct.

==== Training ====
University Police officers attend the standard 16-week police academy in Salem. All police officers receive equivalent training to their city, county and state police counterparts.

==== Interaction with students ====
Generally, campus police officers have greater flexibility than their municipal counterparts when dealing with university students. Student judicial and conduct codes allow for dealing with minor drug, alcohol, and vandalism charges outside the legal system. This gives the university the option of seeing that minor infractions do not become a criminal record for the student.

=== Vehicles ===
Vehicle	Type	Notes	Picture
Ford Crown Victoria	Cruiser		
Chevrolet Tahoe	Patrol SUV		
Ford Taurus Police Interceptor	Cruiser		
Ford F150	Events, Patrol, and Parking Enforcement		

== See also ==
- List of law enforcement agencies in Oregon
- Oregon University System
