= Gladstone Police Department =

- Abbreviation: GPD

Agency overview
- Formed: 1911

Jurisdictional structure
- General nature: Local civilian police

Operational structure
- Police Officers: 15
- Civilians: 5
- Agency executive: John Schmerber, Chief of Police

Website
- www.ci.gladstone.or.us/gladstonepolicechief

Gladstone
- Crime rates* (2013)

Violent crimes
- Homicide: 1
- Rape: 5
- Robbery: 1
- Aggravated assault: 16
- Total violent crime: 23

Property crimes
- Burglary: 44
- Larceny-theft: 220
- Motor vehicle theft: 34
- Arson: 3
- Total property crime: 298
- Note: Reported crimes per 100,000 population Source: 2013 FBI UCR Data

The Gladstone Police Department (GPD) is the law enforcement agency of Gladstone, Oregon, United States.

== Services ==
The Gladstone Police Department provides many services to the citizens of Gladstone and the surrounding communities, including:

Patrol
Patrol operates 24 hours a day, 7 days a week, staffed by uniformed police officers and sergeants. These officers provide 9-1-1 and emergency response, along with responding to routine requests for service and assistance.
Traffic
With portions of Interstate 205 and Oregon Route 99E falling within city limits, in addition to many local roads, traffic enforcement along with accident response and investigation are a major function of GPD.
Detective
GPD staffs 2 full-time police detectives that investigate various felony crimes.
School Resource Officer
The department dedicates a uniformed school resource officer (SRO) for Gladstone School District, along with a high-visibility SRO vehicle.
Municipal Ordinance Specialist
With a focus on maintaining a high standard of community livability, GPD staffs a Municipal Ordinance Specialist (MOS) to enforce compliance of city code.
Reserve Police Officers
In addition to the 15 full-time sworn personnel, GPD maintains an active reserve officer program, fully staffed with 5 volunteer police officers.
Other Services
In addition to the above, GPD maintains a number of other activities and functions, such as a records unit, property and evidence, and a citizen volunteer program.

== Location ==
GPD currently shares a building with City Hall, and is located on Gladstone's main street, Portland Avenue.

== Ranks ==
Title	Insignia
Chief of Police	
Lieutenant	
Sergeant	
Police Officer/Detective	

== History ==
The Gladstone Police Department was founded the same year as Gladstone itself, in 1911. In a state that was only a little more than 50 years old, early Gladstone was very rural, and its police force spent much of its time dealing with rural problems, such as rounding up escaped livestock. In 1913, a large, rabid bulldog was reported to have been menacing the Gladstone's citizens. Chief Miller's last official act as chief, before leaving the position to be a full-time postmaster, was to kill the bulldog. In 1918, GPD appointed a "special woman policeman" to help with combating the 1918 flu pandemic.

Gladstone fired officer Lynn Benton due to the murder of his wife in May 2011. Benton was fired in December 2011, and was later charged with the murder. The department eliminated its canine unit in April 2014. In 2014, GPD received accreditation for attaining a high standard of professionalism, making it one of only 20% of Oregon law enforcement agencies to have received accreditation at that time. Chief Jim Pryde retired early in 2015 after issues with the city council over his paid consulting work.

=== Police chiefs past and present ===
- Asa F. Parker (1911 – 1912)
- Morton Bell (1912 – 1913)
- William H. Miller (1913)
- Percy A. Cross (1913 – 1916)
- Victor Gault (1916)
- Morton Bell (1916)
- R.L. Blancharce (1916 – 1919)
- Thomas E. Gault (1919 – 1925)
- J.C. Wallace (1925 – 1928)
- Harry Morrell (1928 – 1934)
- Henry Strebig (1934 – 1938)
- George Fisner (1938 – 1943)
- Henry Streibig (1943 – 1945)
- Fred Smith (1945 – 1946)
- Henry Strebig (1947)
- Louis Biby (1947 – 1951)
- Clarence E. Moore (1951 – 1957)
- William A. Lewis (1957 – 1961)
- Charles L. McCarthy (1962 – 1965)
- William D. Preble (1966 – 1970)
- David R. Clemens (1970 – 1981)
- Max Patterson (1982 – 1990)
- Robert Beard (interim chief) (1990 – 1991)
- Robert King (1991 – 2002)
- Richard Rye (interim chief) (2002)
- Willie F. Grace (2002 – 2008)
- Joe Simon (interim chief) (2008 – 2009)
- Jim Pryde (2009 – 2015)
- Lee Jundt (interim chief) (2015)
- Jeff Jolley (interim to fully appointed) (2015 – current)

== See also ==
- List of law enforcement agencies in Oregon
- Clackamas County Sheriff's Office
