= Century High School (Oregon) =

Coordinates: 45.503339°N 122.915297°W

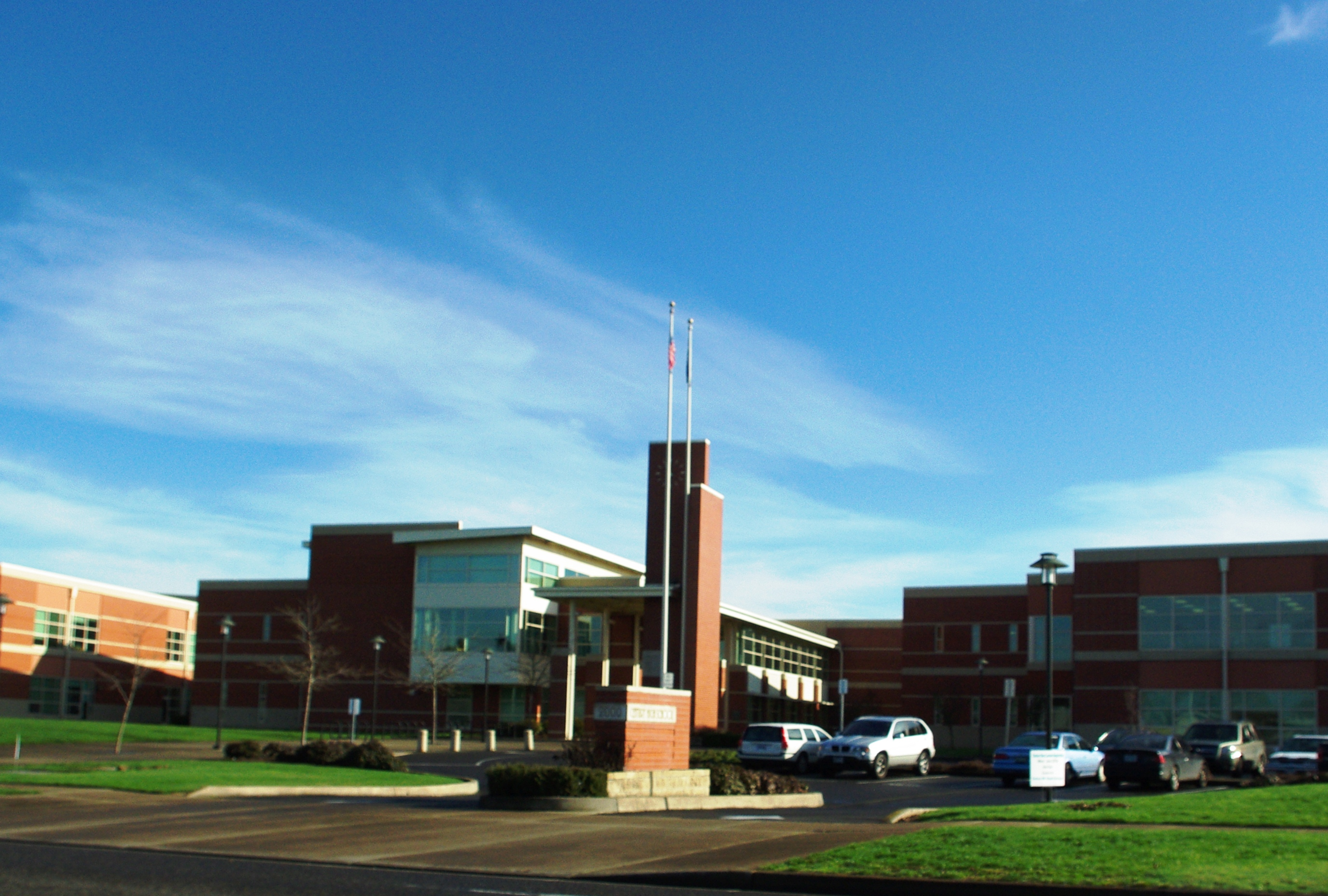

Location
- 2000 SE Century Blvd. Hillsboro, Oregon 97129; United States

Information
- School type: Public high school
- Founded: 1997
- School district: Hillsboro School District 1J
- Principal: Julie Kasper
- Staff: 69.73 (FTE)
- Grades: 9-12
- Enrollment: 1,565 (2023–2024)
- Student to teacher ratio: 22.44
- Language: English
- Campus: Suburban
- Colors: Black, teal, and silver
- Athletics conference: OSAA Pacific Conference 6A-3
- Mascot: Jaguar
- Team name: Jaguars
- Publication: JagMedia
- Feeder schools: Brown Middle School
- Website: Century High School

Century High School (CHS) is located in Hillsboro, Oregon, United States.

== Academics ==
In 2020, 88% of the school's seniors received their high school diploma, and the school has a five-year completion rate of 96%.

=== CCP ===
Several College and Career Pathway (CCP) learning areas are available at Century, including Health Sciences, Informational Technology, Drafting, Web Design, Civic and Community Services, Business & Marketing, Culinary Arts & Hospitality, FAME (Fine Arts), Early Childhood Education, and Leadership-Student Government. The CCP classes give students time to work on their senior project, which must be completed before they can graduate.

== Extracurricular activities ==
=== State Championships ===
- Girls' Swimming: 2014, 2015
- Softball: 2011
- Speech and Debate: 2008, 2011

=== Sports ===
Century's softball team competed in the 2010 state championship game, losing to Glencoe. In 2011, the softball team won the state championship, the first team title in any sport for Century.

The school's football team began in 1997 with home games at Hare Field until the 1999 season when Hillsboro Stadium opened. In 2020, the multipurpose grass field at Century High School was renovated with new turf, lighting, and a new scoreboard. They currently play their home games at this field.

The school's lacrosse team (club sport) currently plays their home games at the same field. They played their home games at Hillsboro Stadium until 2020.

In 2014, Century's girls' swimming team took first place in the state of Oregon, the second state championship of any sport in the school.

There have also been several individual triumphs in the state championships in track and field. In 2009, Logan Kotzian won state in both the 100m and 200m dash becoming Century's fastest-ever student. In 2012, Century placed first in women's long jump, second in women's high jump, and second in women's pole vault.

Century high school also has teams in cheerleading, cross country, dance, soccer, volleyball, wrestling, basketball, baseball, golf, and tennis.

=== Arts ===
The arts department at Century has several bands, a group musical, a choir, and JagTV journalism, among other programs. The marching band participates in many parades. There was a theater program, known as the Century Theater Company, but this was defunded and removed in 2025.

==== Band and Colorguard ====
The Century High School band is led by Director Jim Dunlop. The Winter Percussion Ensemble has gone to the Winter Guard International World Championships three times in recent years, placing fifth (in 2004) and 17th. In 2007, the school took 19th in the world. In 2013 they placed first in A class at the NWAPA Winter championships. School bands have performed at places such as the USS Missouri, Prince Kuhio Day Parade in Hawaii, the University of Nevada, and at the Hard Rock Cafe.

Century's Colorguard and Winterguard are in open class in the NWOC. They also visited Winter Guard International in the past.

Century's drama department puts on an annual one-act play festival in addition to standard plays each year. The group musical has won international competitions and many state titles.

The chess team has placed as high as tenth nationally.

==== School Publication ====
The school's media group, JagMedia, produces content published on social media platforms such as YouTube and Instagram, as well as on their own JagMedia website. They continue to make videos consisting of interviews, podcasts, and other entertainment-based videos.

=== Speech and debate ===
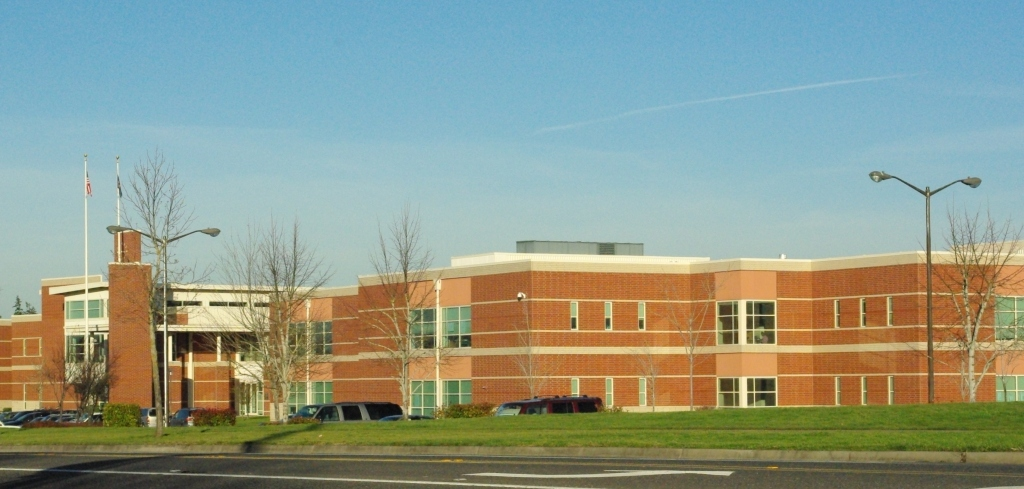
Southwest corner of the school

In 2008, the cross-examination team took first place at state. In 2011, a student earned first place in Lincoln-Douglas Value Debate at state.

== Demographics ==
American Indian/Alaska Native	Asian	Black/African American	Hispanic/Latino	Multiracial	Native Hawaiian/Pacific Islander	White
1%	13%	3%	32%	7%	1%	43%

== Notable alumni ==
- Jonathan Brookins (2003), former UFC fighter
- Chehales Tapscott (2008), basketball player who plays professionally overseas
- Savannah Outen (2009), singer
