= Hillsboro Stadium =

Sport stadium in Oregon, USA

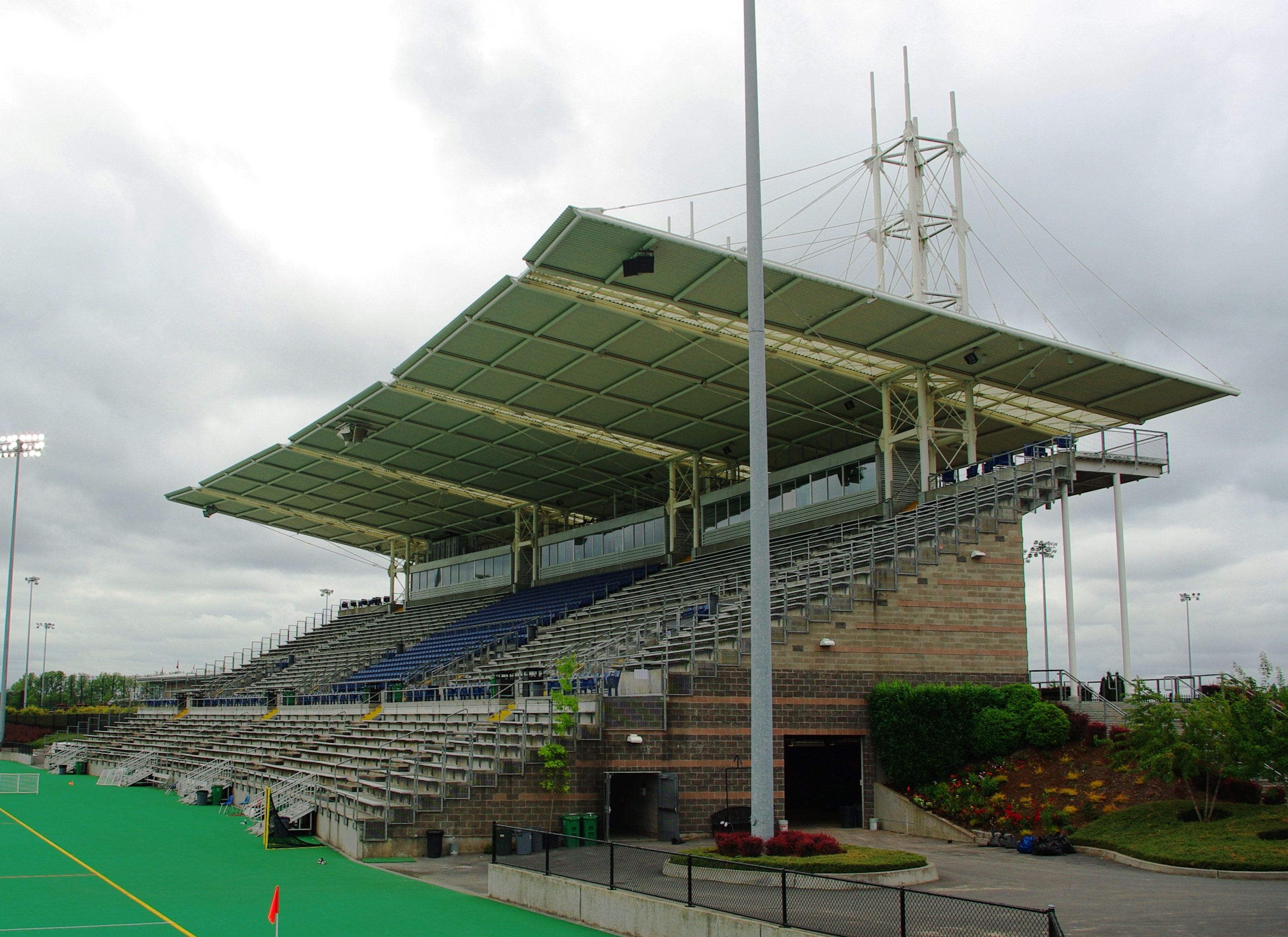
- Main grandstand in 2009

- Location in the United States Location in Oregon
- Interactive map of Hillsboro Stadium
- Address: 4450 NE Century Boulevard
- Location: Hillsboro, Oregon, U.S.
- Coordinates: 45.554°N 122.907°W
- Elevation: 220 feet (67 m) AMSL
- Owner: City of Hillsboro
- Operator: City of Hillsboro Parks & Recreation Department
- Capacity: 7,600 (expandable to 10,000)
- Surface: FieldTurf (2010–present); AstroTurf (1999–2009)

Construction
- Opened: 1999; 27 years ago
- Renovated: 2010 (new artificial turf)
- Cost: $7.5 million ($14.5 million in 2025)
- Architect: GBD Architects

Tenants
- Portland State Vikings football (NCAA) (2000, 2010, 2018–present); Portland State Vikings women's soccer (NCAA) (2010–present); Central Catholic H.S. Rams football (OSAA) (2000, 2010, 2013–present); Century H.S. Jaguars football & lacrosse (OSAA) (1999–2020); Pacific University Boxers baseball & softball (NCAA) (2007); Portland Stags (MLU) (2015) (OSAA) Boys' State Football Tournament (2003, 2007–present) partial schedule Portland Timbers 2 (MLS Next Pro) (2020, 2022)

Hillsboro Stadium is a multi-sport stadium in the Northwestern United States, located in Hillsboro, Oregon, a suburb west of Portland. Opened 27 years ago in 1999 and owned by the city of Hillsboro, the award-winning stadium is part of the Gordon Faber Recreation Complex located in the northeast part of the city, adjacent to the Sunset Highway.

The facility hosts home football games for Portland State University, plus state playoff games for the Oregon School Activities Association's smaller school divisions. Hillsboro Stadium is also used for baseball, softball, soccer, and lacrosse and has hosted college and professional teams. Hillsboro Stadium is used for the NWAPA's annual Century Showcase. The adjacent Hillsboro Ballpark (formerly Ron Tonkin Field) opened in 2013.

The primary playing field runs northwest to southeast, at an approximate elevation of 220 feet (67 m) above sea level. The covered main grandstand and press box are along the southwest sideline.

== History ==
The stadium cost $7.5 million to build, and opened in August 1999; the entire sports complex cost $10 million to build, with funding from the city and the Ronler Acres urban renewal district. The first high school football game at Hillsboro Stadium was on September 17, 1999, when Century played Oregon City. Previously, Century had used Hare Field after the school opened in 1997, sharing that stadium with Hillsboro and Glencoe high schools.

In 2000, the facility was expanded to increase the seating capacity from 4,000 to the current 7,000 plus. An additional 3,000 temporary seats were added at that time as well to accommodate the Portland State football team. The team used Hillsboro Stadium in 2000 when Civic Stadium (now Providence Park) was being renovated. Portland's Central Catholic High School also played their home games at the stadium that season as well. In May 2001, the University of Oregon Ducks held their annual spring football game at the stadium, which included future NFL quarterbacks Joey Harrington and Jason Fife.

In October 2005, Hillsboro Stadium hosted a neutral-site college football game between NAIA Southern Oregon University and NCAA Division III Pacific Lutheran University. During the 2007 season, Pacific University’s baseball and softball teams used the stadium while their new facility was being built in Forest Grove. In June 2008, the opening ceremonies of the Special Olympics Oregon Summer Games were held at the facility.

In 2008, the stadium hosted a regular season game between the Philadelphia Barrage and the New Jersey Pride of Major League Lacrosse (MLL) on August 9. New Jersey won the game with attendance totaling 3,687 people. Hillsboro Stadium is mentioned as the likely home of any MLL team that may be awarded to or relocate to Portland. The annual Les Schwab Bowl for high school football all stars was played at the stadium since 2009.

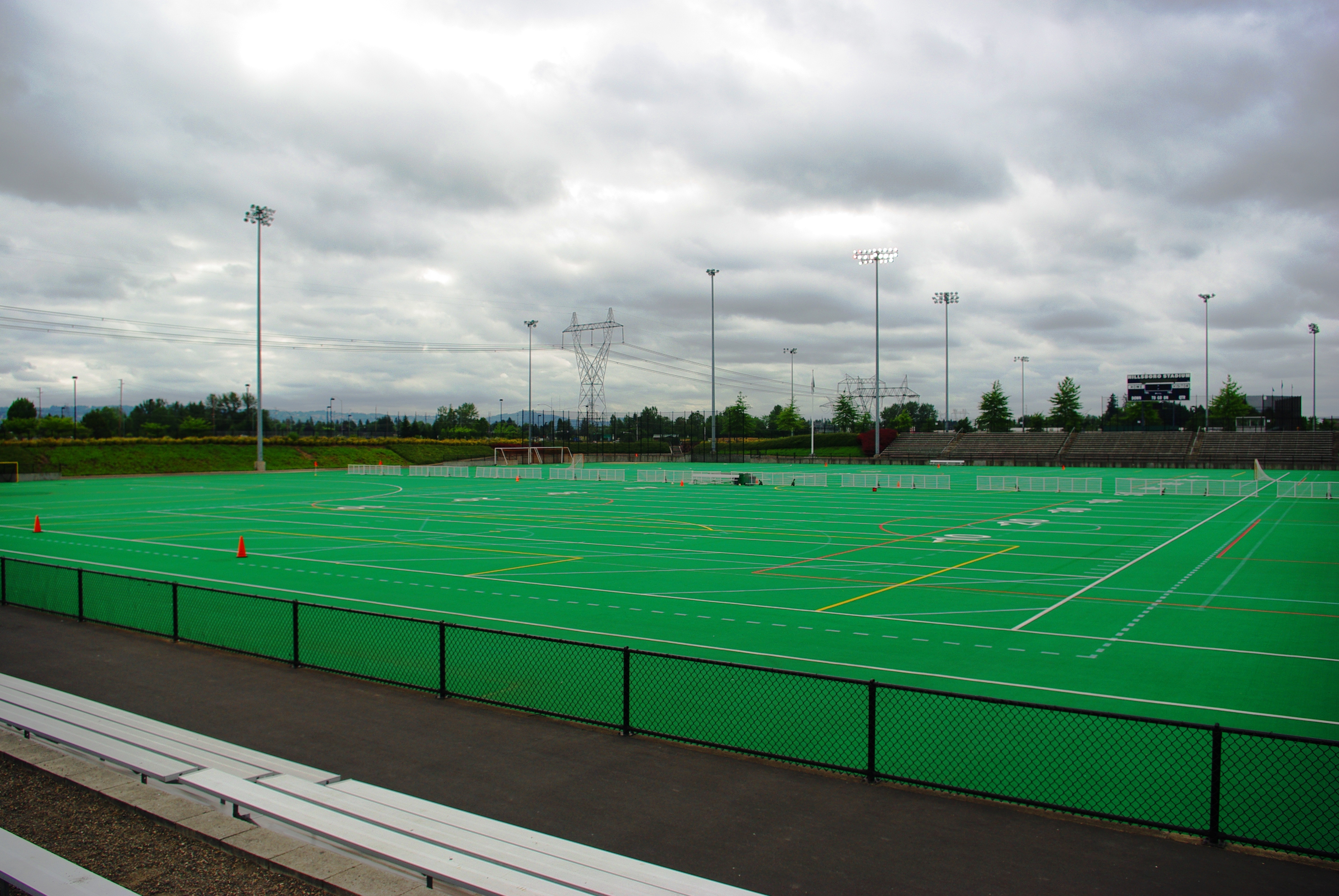
Playing surface in 2009

In February 2010, the original AstroTurf of 1999 was replaced with FieldTurf. The renovation cost $988,000, of which the school district covered $250,000 of those costs.

Portland State again used Hillsboro Stadium in May 2010 for its spring football game, and held its four home games there during the 2010 season, while PGE Park (now Providence Park) underwent a remodel to prepare for Major League Soccer. Also due to those renovations, Central Catholic High School played its home football games at Hillsboro Stadium. In March 2012, the city announced it was exploring the addition of a baseball stadium at the complex in hopes of adding a minor league baseball team.

Portland State played one game at Hillsboro in 2015, when Providence Park was unavailable due to its use as a Portland Timbers venue. The Vikings returned for four games in 2018, with only one at Providence Park. In that season, the Vikings not only faced conflicts with the Timbers, but also with the Timbers' NWSL sister team, the Portland Thorns; the NWSL championship game; and stadium expansion. Starting in the 2019 season, Portland State has used Hillboro as its regular home field. Portland State will play its first home game outside of Hillsboro since 2018 when it returns to Providence Park for a contest against FCS power house Montana.

== Facility ==
Designed by GBD Architects and built by Hoffman Construction Company, the stadium was named one of 1999's Best Public Project Award recipients by AIA Western International. The facility also won the 2000 Design Award of Merit from International Illumination Design Award. Hillsboro Stadium has a 170,000-square-foot (16,000 m^{2}) FieldTurf field. This field is large enough to accommodate two games at the same time. The main grandstand is on the southwest side of the field and contains locker rooms, concession stands, and team training facilities. Seating capacity is approximately 7,600, and the main covered grandstand seats 4,000.

The FieldTurf field is used for a variety of sports. These include football, soccer, baseball, and softball. The main use is for high school athletics for Hillsboro’s four high schools, primarily Century. The stadium also hosts other events such as foot races, OSAA state football playoffs, Cyclocross (Cross Crusade), expositions for rally cars, and high school band competitions.

== See also ==
- List of sports venues in Portland, Oregon
- Shute Park
- Noble Woods Park
- Hondo Dog Park
