= Salem Police Department (Oregon) =

Municipal police department for Salem, Oregon

The Salem Police Department is a municipal law enforcement agency for the city of Salem. Salem is the capital of Oregon and is its third-largest city behind Portland and Eugene. Salem police officers are charged with enforcing all of Oregon's criminal laws and Oregon Revised Statutes. They also enforce city-created criminal codes and violations known as SRCs or Salem Revised Code. Various portions in the area are not part of the city and fall under the Marion County Sheriff's office; for example, numerous sections of Lancaster fall under this category. The Salem Police Department has five divisions: Administrative, Communications, Investigations, Patrol and Support.

== Staffing ==
The Salem Police Department is staffed by 189 police officers (including the Chief of Police, DCs and other high-ranking officers) and 118 civilian employees, whose mission is to respond to the law enforcement and public safety needs of the community. The department subscribes to the community-oriented policing model to bring police and citizens together to better fight crime in the community. The five divisions (Administration, Communications, Investigations, Patrol and Support) are designed to provide the most efficient and timely service possible to citizens.

In addition to full-time employees, the Salem Police Department is staffed by interns and volunteers who work in various departments.

== Departments ==
SPD is broken into five sections, which are then broken up to be served in some instances by a single individual.

- Management Resources
- Criminal Investigations
- Special Operations
- Community Response
- Field Operations

WVCC (Dispatch)
