= Noble Woods Park =

Nature trail in Hillsboro, OR

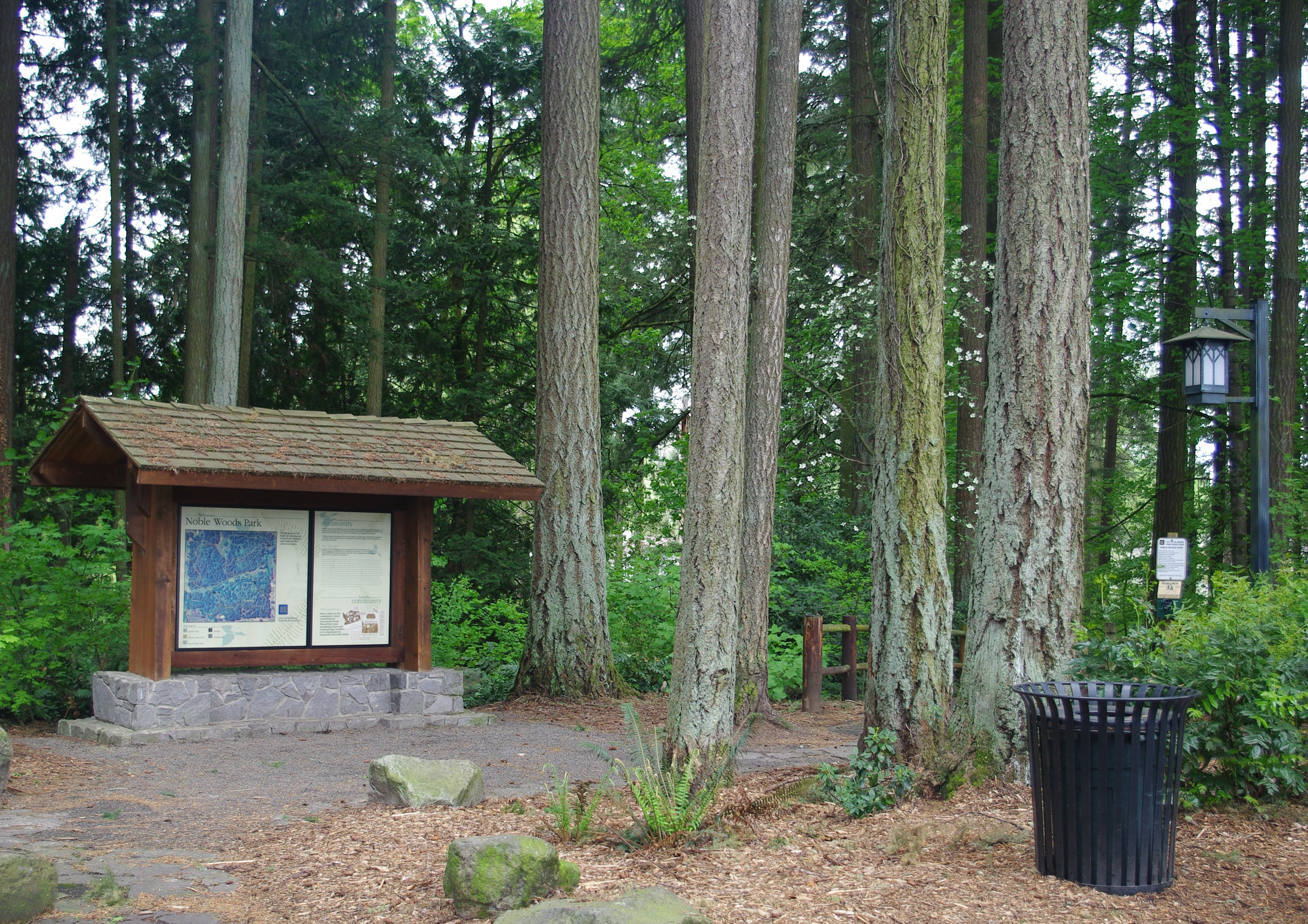
- Trail head at the north entrance
- Interactive map of Noble Woods Park
- Type: Public, city
- Location: Hillsboro, Oregon, United States
- Coordinates: 45°31′07″N 122°55′02″W
- Area: 38 acres (150,000 m^{2})
- Created: 1998
- Operator: Hillsboro Parks & Recreation Department
- Status: open
- Parking: Two lots
- Website: Noble Woods Park

Noble Woods Park is a wooded city park in Hillsboro, Oregon, United States. Located on approximately 40 acres (160,000 m^{2}) along Rock Creek, the nature park with wetlands and forests is situated between West Baseline Road on the north and Southwest Borwick Road to the south near the Orenco neighborhood. The city acquired the land for the park in 1992 and opened the park in the eastern section of the city in 1998. Noble Woods has two entrances, a picnic area, and hiking trails.

== History ==
In 1991, the city of Hillsboro asked voters to approve a bond which would pay for the purchase of nearly 40 acres (160,000 m^{2}) of woodland and wetland along Rock Creek east of the city from Charlie Noble. The bond measure failed on election day, and instead local residents devised an alternative funding plan: 200 people each pledged $500 down followed by annual payments of $300 each for five years, plus $50,000 in donations from the Hillsboro Rotary Club and Baker Rock Resources to be matched by the city government. Noble also agreed to sell the land on a five-year contract for $881,000 for use as a park, a discount from the assessed value of $1 million. The city purchased the land in 1992.

After acquiring the park land, the city used some funds from Metro’s open spaces bond measure to construct infrastructure at the site in 1997. In 1997, the city paid to add an overlook of Rock Creek, built at a cost of $44,200. The city opened the park on Earth Day in 1998. In June 2006, volunteer work groups removed the non-native English ivy from parts of the park. Another group, part of SOLV, worked to remove more ivy at Noble Woods in April 2008.

== Amenities ==
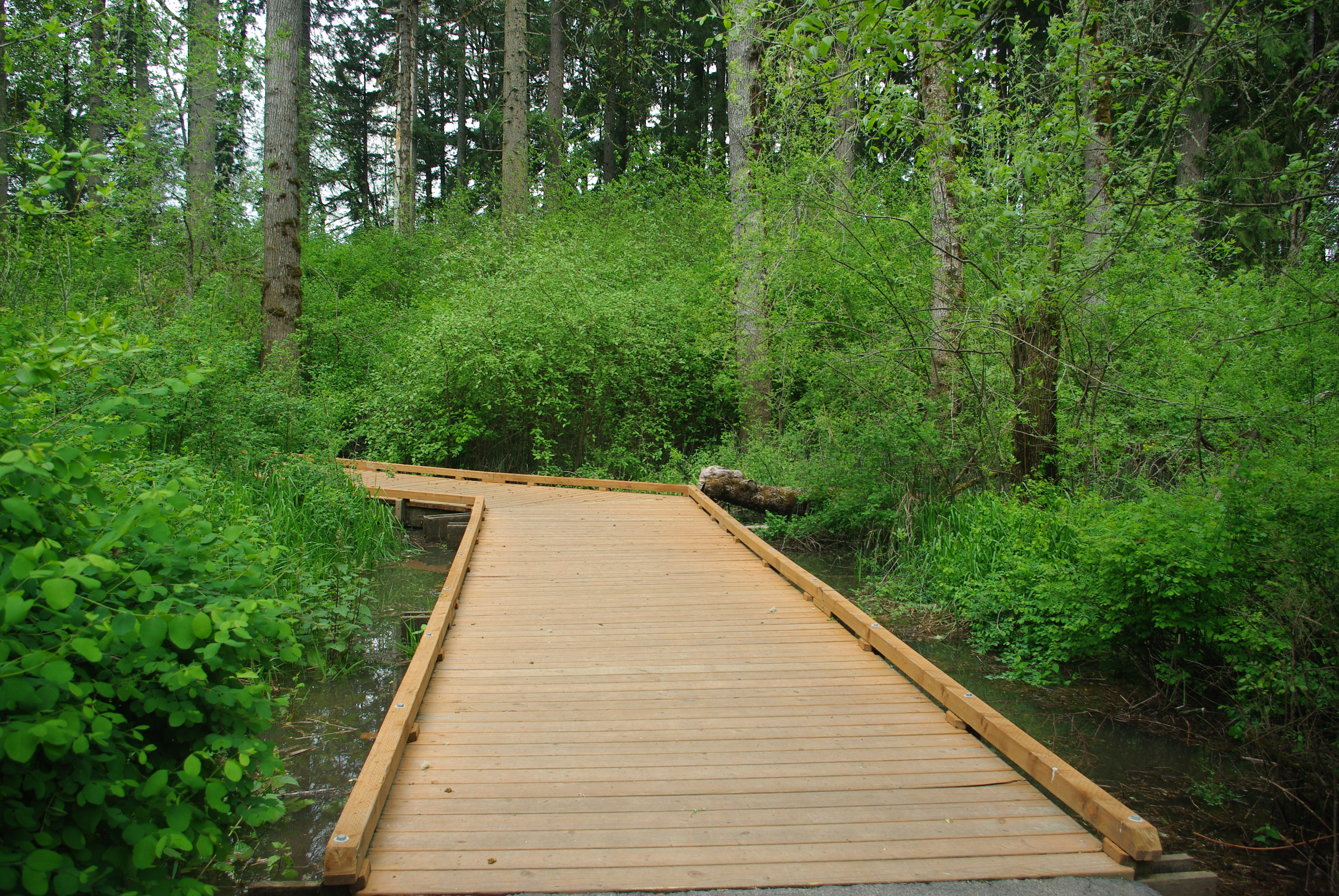
Boardwalk across wetlands

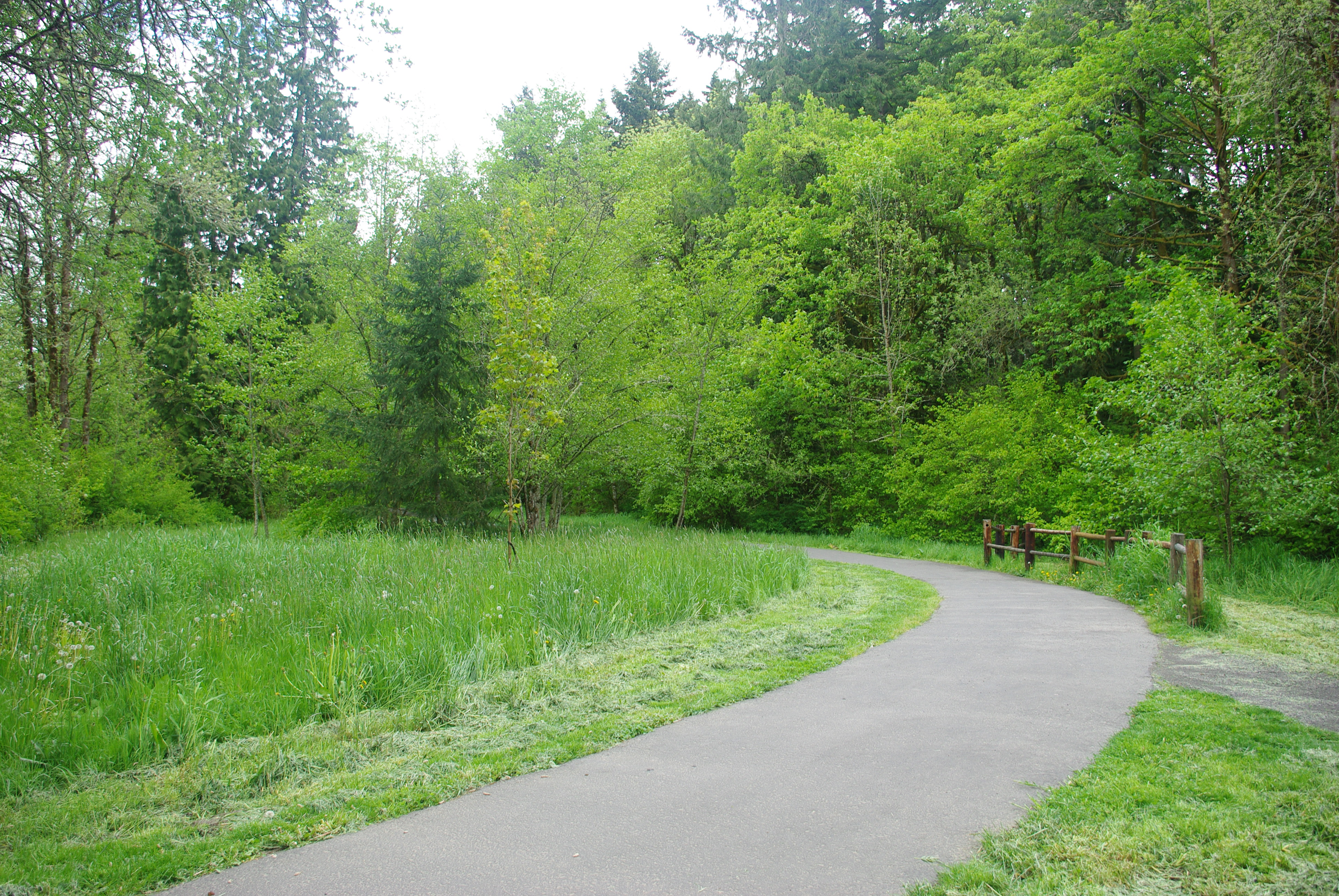
Trail through a meadow area

Most of the park is undeveloped natural areas accessible by trails

Noble Woods includes wheelchair-accessible trails, bridges, stepping stones, and a stone and wrought iron constructed overlook of Rock Creek, a tributary of the Tualatin River. There is about 1 mile (1.6 km) of paved trails. One trail includes stepping stones located in the creek to allow passage over the water. In addition to hiking trails, the park has a picnic area with restrooms and a covered activity shelter. There are two entrances, one on both the north and south side, and each has paved parking. The north entrance is off East Main Street (formerly West Baseline Road) near Northeast Century Boulevard (formerly Northwest 231st Avenue), and the south entrance off Southeast Borwick Street (formerly Southwest Borwick Road). The south entrance has the picnic area that includes tables and a meadow.

== Natural environment ==
The park's natural environment includes both upland forests and wetlands at this location where Rock Creek receives Beaverton Creek. The upland forest section is on the north side, with the southern part of the park lowlands that include wetlands, meadows, the creek, and some ponds. Bird species at Noble Woods includes chickadees, Winter Wren, blue herons, ducks, nuthatches, Brown Creeper, Tree Swallow, hawks, Black-headed Grosbeak, and turkey vultures, among others.

Terrestrial wildlife includes beavers, tree frogs, and raccoons among others. Additionally, the park is home to some bats. Aquatic life in the creek includes crawfish, freshwater mussels, and some smaller fish. Snowberry, Pacific dogwood, Douglas fir, red cedar, nightshade, alder, western hemlock, ash, rose hips, red osier dogwood bushes, ninebark, bittersweet nightshade, jewelweed, and maples make up the various plant species at the park. Some of the cedar trees are more than a century old.

== See also ==
- Hillsboro Stadium
- Hondo Dog Park
- Jackson Bottom Wetlands Preserve
- Shute Park
