= Hondo Dog Park =

City park in Hillsboro, Oregon, U.S.

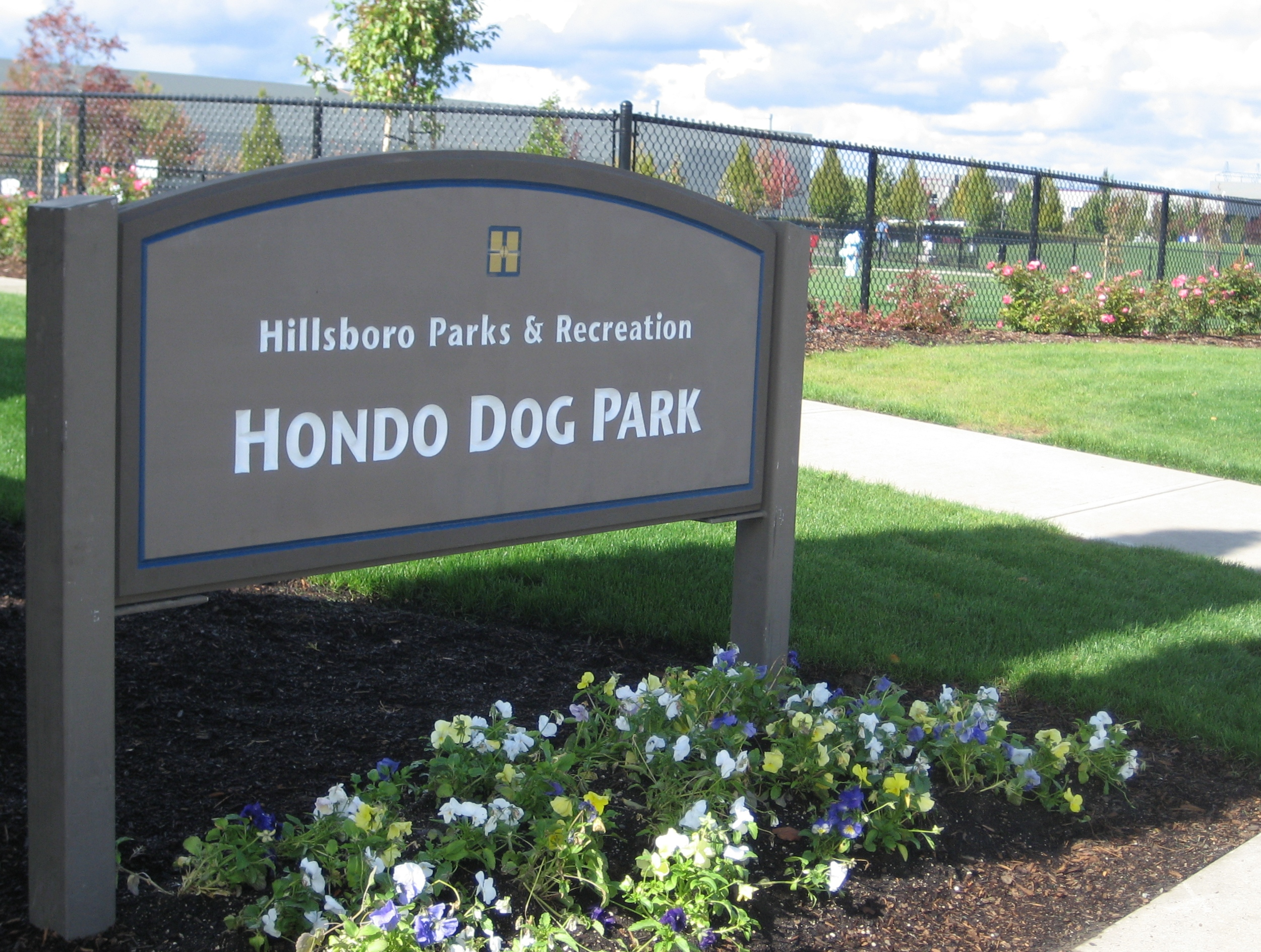
- Entrance to the park.
- Interactive map of Hondo Dog Park
- Type: Public, city
- Location: Hillsboro, Oregon, United States
- Coordinates: 45°33′10″N 122°54′36″W
- Area: 3.75 acres (15,200 m^{2})
- Created: 2007
- Operator: Hillsboro Parks & Recreation Department
- Status: Day use only
- Website: Hondo Dog Park

Hondo Dog Park is a city park in Hillsboro, Oregon, United States. Opened in 2007, it is the first dog park in that city. Located on nearly four acres, the park is in the northeast section of Hillsboro adjacent to Hillsboro Stadium. Hondo Dog Park is named after a Hillsboro Police Department K-9 unit dog that was shot and killed in the line of duty. The park includes a fire hydrant painted like an American flag as a memorial to the police dog, which received some controversy when the park opened.

== Amenities ==
The off-leash park is located off Northeast 229th Avenue near Hillsboro Stadium and the Sunset Highway. Hondo Dog Park sits on 3.75 acres (15,200 m^{2}) and has three sections. A small fenced in section is for timid and smaller dogs, while the larger portion contains a general playing area and an area designed for all-weather use containing sand. The park opened on September 17, 2007, with a grand opening event held on September 29 for Hillsboro's first dog park.

One natural feature at the park is a small hill. Other features include drinking water stations designed for canine use, double-gated entrances, wheelchair accessible gravel paths, and park benches. Many features have dog themes painted on them.

The park also features two former fire hydrants donated by Clean Water Services and painted by a local dog association. One hydrant is decorated with cartoon dog characters, while the other is painted with an American flag and known as the "Hondo Memorial Hydrant". The hydrant with the American flag is a memorial to the namesake of the park and is situated atop an 18-inch (460 mm) base. Within a week of opening officials removed the hydrant painted as an American flag over concerns of disrespect for the flag if dogs used the hydrant, but it was later returned and fenced off to prevent such incidents. The controversy over the flag painted hydrant received international news.

== Namesake ==
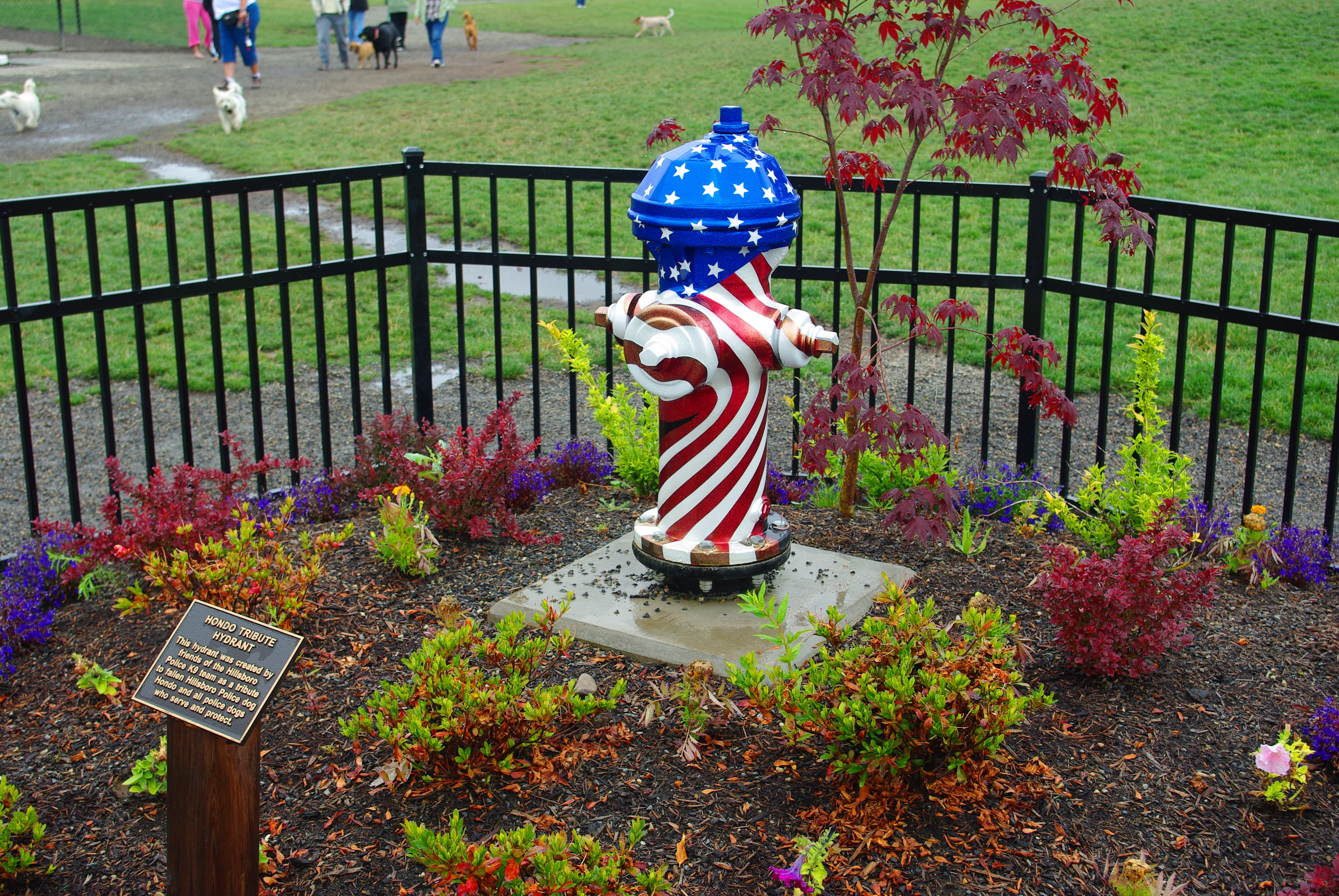
Memorial hydrant to Hondo after fencing added

Hondo, a German Shepherd Dog, was a canine member of the Hillsboro Police Department. A three-year-old, Hondo won a Silver Medal of Valor from county law enforcement in early March 1997 for taking down a man armed with a knife. He spent two years with the department and helped to catch 32 suspects in total.

Hondo was killed on March 12, 1997, during a police shootout. A memorial service drew police dogs and officers from around the state of Oregon. Hondo's ashes were spread over the city. He is the only Hillsboro K-9 officer killed in the line of duty. The park’s entrance includes a plaque dedicated to Hondo.

== See also ==
- Noble Woods Park
- Cornell Creek Park
