= List of hospitals in Portland, Oregon =

The following is a partial list of hospitals in Portland, Oregon, United States.

== Private hospitals ==
Hospital	Est.	Beds	Trauma level	Teaching hospital	Notes	Ref.
Adventist Medical Center	1893	302	—	No		
Legacy Emanuel Medical Center	1912	554	1	No		
Legacy Good Samaritan Hospital	1875	539	—	Yes		
Portland Shriners Hospital	1923	29	—	No	Pediatric facility	
Providence Portland Medical Center	1941	483	—	No		
Providence St. Vincent Medical Center	1875	523	—	Yes		
Randall Children's Hospital	1960	165	—	No	Part of Legacy Emanuel Medical Center; renamed in 2011	

== Others ==
Hospital	Est.	Beds	Trauma level	Teaching hospital	Notes	Ref.
Doernbecher Children's Hospital	1926		—	Yes	Pediatric facility; affiliated with Oregon Health & Science University Hospital	
Oregon Health & Science University Hospital	1887	522	1	Yes		
Oregon State Hospital - Portland			—	No	Psychiatric facility	
Veterans Affairs Portland Medical Center			—	No	Operated by United States Department of Veterans Affairs	

== Defunct hospitals ==
Hospital	Est.	Closed	Beds	Teaching hospital	Notes	Ref.
Bess Kaiser Hospital	1959	1998		No		
Eastmoreland Hospital	1940s	2004	100	No	Subsumed by Reed College and demolished	
Woodland Park Hospital	1962	2006		No		

== See also ==
- List of hospitals in Oregon
- List of hospitals in the United States
