= Willamette Valley Medical Center =

Hospital in McMinnville, Oregon, U.S.

- Capella Healthcare
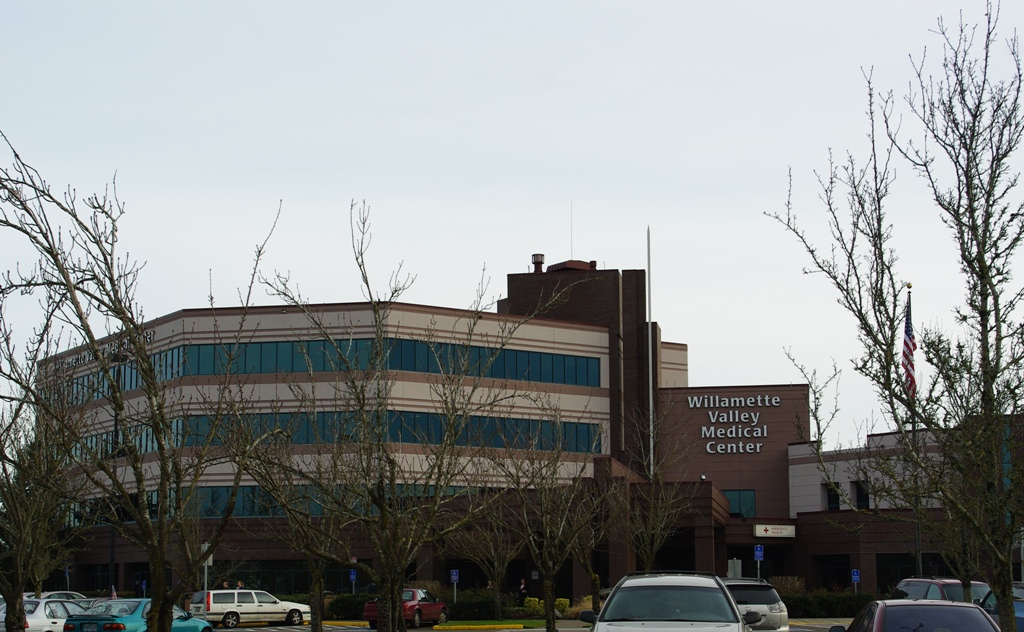
- Main building in 2009

Geography
- Location: McMinnville,, Yamhill County, Oregon, United States
- Coordinates: 45.1990°N 123.1647°W

Organization
- Care system: Medicare/Medicaid/Charity/Public
- Type: General
- Affiliated university: None

Services
- Emergency department: Level III trauma center
- Beds: 60

History
- Founded: 1904

Links
- Website: https://willamettevalleymedical.com
- Lists: Hospitals in Oregon

Willamette Valley Medical Center is a for-profit Level III acute care hospital in McMinnville, Oregon, United States, adjacent to the McMinnville Airport on Oregon Route 18. Opened at a different location as McMinnville Community Hospital, the four-story medical center has 60 licensed hospital beds. It is owned by LifePoint Health.

== History ==
The hospital was established in McMinnville in 1904. Known originally as McMinnvile Hospital, it was expanded in 1931, 1957, and 1968 before it was purchased by Hospital Corporation of America in 1971. At the time, it had 56-beds and was located on South Baker Street in downtown near Linfield College. The facility had grown to 78 beds in 1975 when it planned to add 9 more beds. By 1985 the hospital was renamed as McMinnville Community Hospital. In September 1987, Hospital Corporation of America sold the hospital and 101 other medical centers to Health Trust, a company created by the employees.

In 1994, owner Columbia/HCA Healthcare Corporation approved the construction of a new campus near the city's airport. Built on the 35 acres (140,000 m^{2}) the new facility cost $45 million to build and was more than twice as big as the former hospital. The new 67-bed campus opened in March 1996 and was constructed by McDevitt Street Bovis. The hospital was then renamed to "Columbia Willamette Valley Medical Center".

The hospital was named one of America's 100 Top Hospitals in 1995 by Mercer Health Care Provider Consulting and HCIA, Inc. out of 3,400 hospitals nationwide. A occupational medicine clinic was added in 1999. In 1999, Columbia/HCA created two subsidiaries and sold the hospital to Triad, one of those two spin-offs.

In 2001, the hospital had revenues of $88.3 million and an operating profit of $10.5 million. In October 2002, a 8,000-square-foot (740 m^{2}) cancer treatment center was opened at a cost of $5.5 million. Community Health Systems purchased Triad in a $6.8 billion deal in July 2007, acquiring the McMinnville medical center. In March 2008, the hospital was one of nine facilities sold by Community Health Systems to Capella Healthcare.

== Building and location ==
The exterior of the four-story is faced with mauve colored brick and blue tinted windows. The medical center main building contains 164,150 square feet (15,250 m^{2}) of space.

Willamette Valley Medical Center is the only hospital in the city of McMinnville; the closest medical center outside of McMinnville is Providence Newberg Medical Center in Newberg.

== Services ==
Willamette Valley Medical offers a variety of medical services including critical care, acute care, a 24-hour Level III emergency department, diagnostic imaging, cancer treatment, dialysis, cardiac care, a birth center, occupational medicine, operating rooms, and laboratory services among others. Behind the hospital building is the 8,000-square-foot (740 m^{2}) cancer treatment center. The center's building includes a water fountain made of copper, a kitchenette for patients, an enclosed walkway to the main building, floor-to-ceiling windows, and an exterior courtyard. Inside, the facility offers radiation treatment, chemotherapy, and a linear accelerator. The cancer center also offers outpatient treatments.

== Finances and size ==
In 2026, the hospital had a net profit of $14 million on gross patient revenues of $559 million.

In 2007, the center staffed 67 hospital beds and had 108,573 visits of which 20,204 were emergency department visits. That year there were 1,303 surgeries and 749 babies born at the hospital. The medical center is accredited by The Joint Commission, employees 592 people, and has 150 doctors with access.

== Heliport ==
Valley Medical Center Heliport
- IATA: none; ICAO: none; FAA LID: OG38

Summary
- Airport type: Private
- Owner: Willamette Valley Medical Center
- Location: McMinnville, Oregon
- Elevation AMSL: 159 ft (48 m)
- Coordinates: 45°11′58.0000″N 123°09′48.0000″W
- Interactive map of Valley Medical Center Heliport

Helipads
Number	Length		Surface
Number	ft	m	Surface
H1	44	13	Concrete

Valley Medical Center Heliport (FAA LID: OG38) is a private heliport associated with the Medical Center.

== See also ==
- List of hospitals in Oregon
