= McKenzie-Willamette Medical Center =

- Community Health Systems
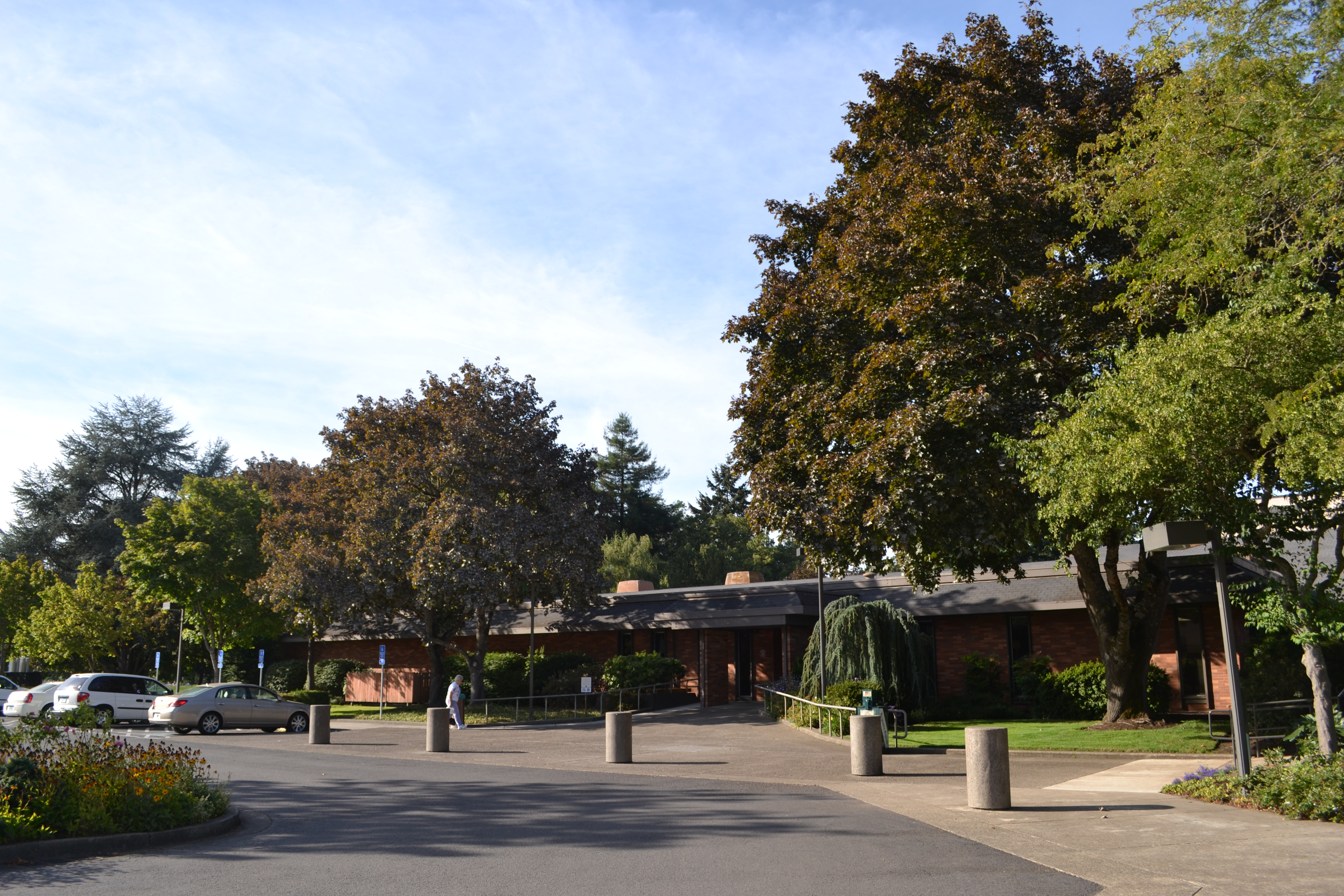
- The McKenzie-Willamette Medical Center

Geography
- Location: 1460 G Street, Springfield, Oregon, United States
- Coordinates: 44.05318°N 123.00397°W

Organization
- Care system: Medicare/Medicaid/Charity/Public
- Type: General

Services
- Emergency department: Level III trauma center
- Beds: 114

Helipads
- Helipad: FAA LID: 41OR

History
- Founded: May 1, 1955

Links
- Website: http://www.mckweb.com
- Lists: Hospitals in Oregon

McKenzie-Willamette Medical Center is an acute care hospital located in Springfield, Oregon, United States. Opened in 1955, it serves the Lane County area. McKenzie-Willamette is investor-owned, and accredited by the Joint Commission. Licensed for 114 hospital beds, the facility was the only hospital in Springfield until the Sacred Heart facility at RiverBend opened in August 2008.

== History ==
The need for a new hospital on the Springfield side of the Willamette River became evident in 1948 when the river flooded, cutting off access to the existing Sacred Heart Medical Center in neighboring Eugene. A group of residents formed a board and raised funds. In May 1955, McKenzie-Willamette Hospital was established.

By early 2002, the medical center employed 1,150 people and was the second largest employer in the city. In 2002, the hospital sued rival area hospital operator PeaceHealth for antitrust claims, with a jury awarding McKenzie-Willamette $16.2 million in damages. The decision was later overturned and the two reached a settlement in August 2008.

In late 2002, McKenzie-Willamette Hospital began to have financial difficulty. They searched for a partner that could keep them from going bankrupt. On January 30, 2003, they announced a partnership with publicly traded Triad Hospitals. After a state-mandated public review period, Oregon Attorney General Hardy Myers announced his approval for the joint venture.

On October 1, 2003, McKenzie-Willamette Hospital partnered with Triad Hospitals in a joint venture. This reorganized the hospital from a non-profit organization, into a for-profit, limited liability company. Triad Hospitals has since been bought out by Community Health Systems, Inc.

=== Proposed relocation ===
On November 16, 2005, McKenzie-Willamette announced that they had struck a deal to purchase 42 acres (17 ha) from River Ridge Golf Course, north of Eugene. They intended to build a new campus, and move from their existing facility in Springfield.

This idea was immediately met with community concern about the impact it would have on traffic and the local property values. Groups such as the North Delta Neighbors were formed to oppose the re-zoning and development of the Delta Ridge site.

After two years of working with the community, on January 11, 2008, McKenzie-Willamette announced that they were withdrawing consideration for the Delta Ridge site, and would look at their alternative sites to build a new hospital. The alternate sites include their existing campus in Springfield, a 13-acre (5.3 ha) site in Eugene, and a 40-acre (16 ha) tract in Glenwood.

== Heliport ==
There is a 53 x 53 ft (16 x 16 m) heliport on the roof of the hospital. it is identified by the FAA as Mc Will Hospital Heliport (FAA LID: 41OR).

== See also ==
- List of hospitals in Oregon
