= Kaiser Sunnyside Medical Center =

- Kaiser Permanente

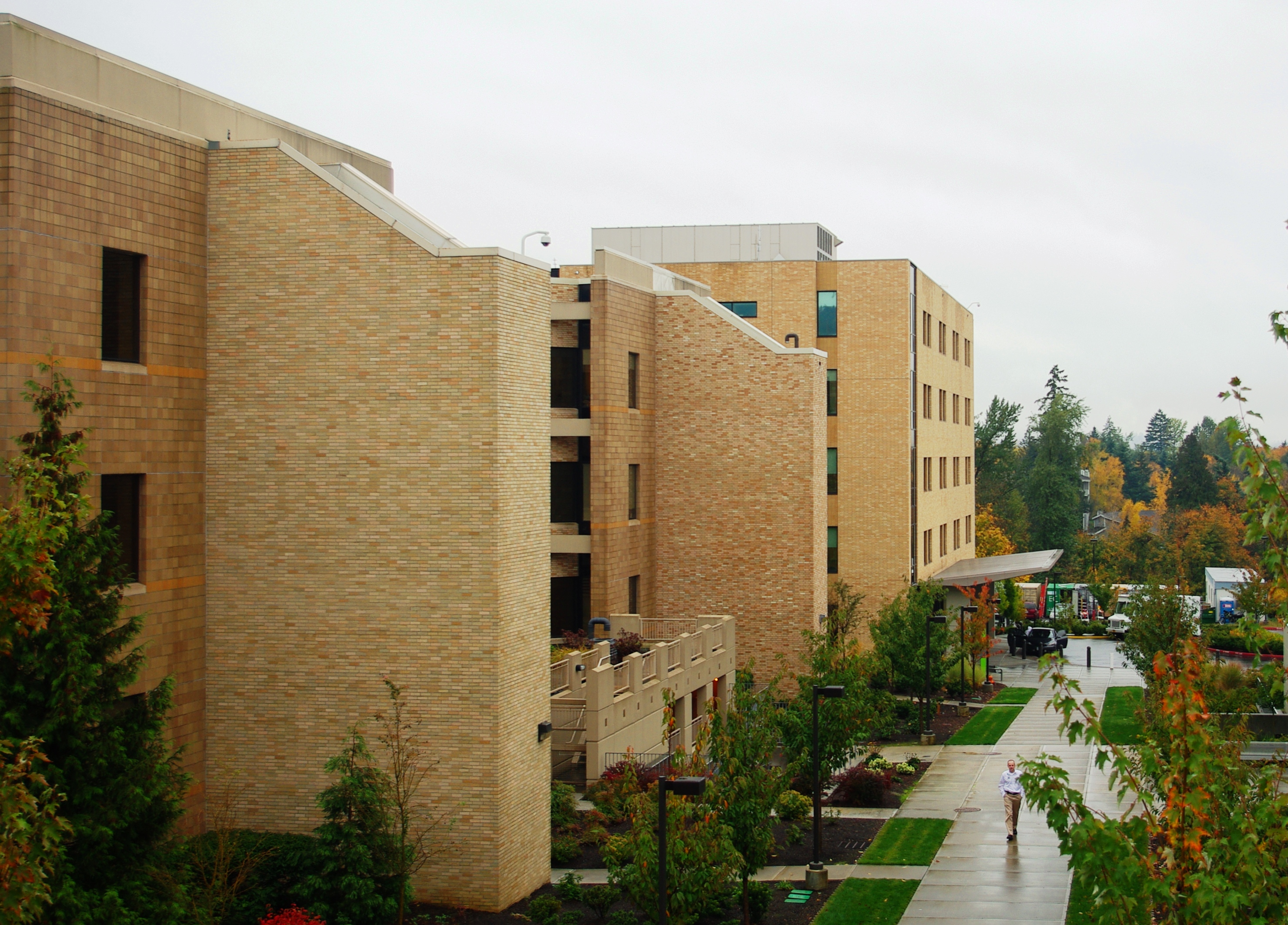

Geography
- Location: Sunnyside, Clackamas County, Oregon, United States
- Coordinates: 45°25′55″N 122°33′36″W

Organization
- Care system: Private
- Type: General

Services
- Emergency department: Yes
- Beds: 233

History
- Founded: 1975

Links
- Website: Official website
- Lists: Hospitals in Oregon

Kaiser Sunnyside Medical Center is a not-for-profit, general care hospital in the Sunnyside area of Clackamas County in the U.S. state of Oregon. Opened in 1975, the Kaiser Permanente owned facility is licensed for 233 hospital beds. Located in the Portland metropolitan area along Interstate 205 on the east side, after Bess Kaiser Hospital in north Portland closed, it was Kaiser's only hospital in the Portland area until Westside Medical Center opened in 2013. The hospital includes Clackamas County's only heart surgery facility.

== History ==
Kaiser Permanente opened the Sunnyside hospital on Portland's eastside in 1975. Politician Mary Wendy Roberts was treated at the hospital and underwent surgery in 1978 for internal bleeding. In 1983, the hospital contained 125 beds, which grew to 150 beds in 1985. The south wing at the facility opened in 1984 as doctors' offices after initially being planned as standard patient rooms with hospital beds. At completion of the structure, it was determined there was then over capacity in hospital beds, and the space was converted to offices. These offices were remodeled for $4 million in 2002 to 2003, re-opening as a 20-bed unit in 2003.

The hospital treated Olympic figure skater Tonya Harding in March 1994 for injuries from an assault in a park. In 2000, the stroke unit was named as one of the top 100 in the nation by the HCIA-Sachs Institute. Parking garages were opened on the campus in 2003 and 2005.

Kaiser Sunnyside completed construction of a four-story building at a cost of $88 million in 2007. An expanded oncology department with 20 beds opened in that wing in January 2009. In April 2009, the hospital opened a 40-bed cardiac unit used for open heart surgery. This unit includes three surgery suites and was in planning since 2003. Both the cardiac unit and expanded cancer care were part of a $150 million expansion that added 241,655 square feet (22,450.5 m^{2}) with 170 beds and additional medical office space to the campus.

== Details ==
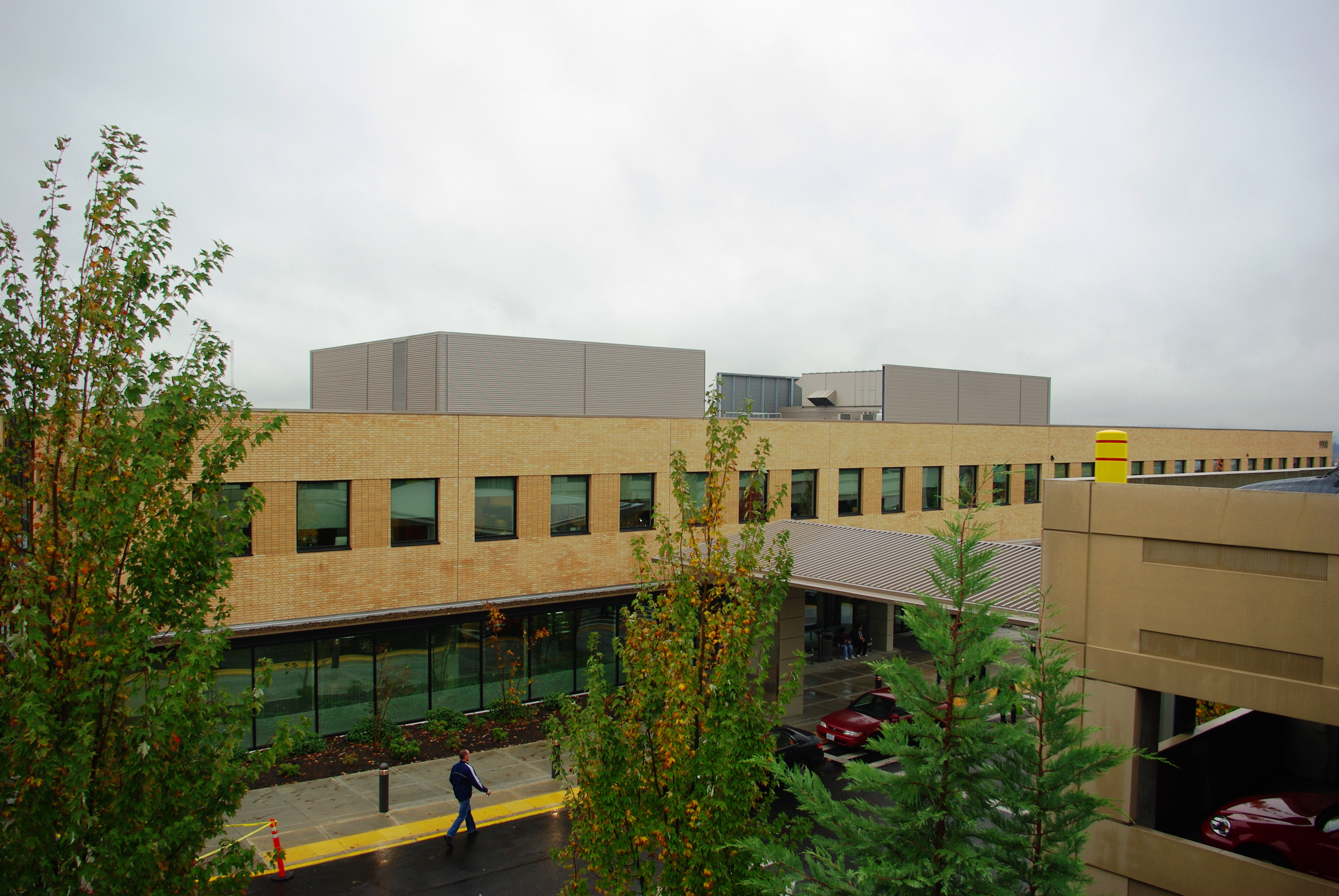
Buildings on the campus

Kaiser Sunnyside is licensed for 233 hospital beds and is accredited by the Joint Commission. Services at the medical center include a maternity ward, cancer treatment, dialysis, a women's health center, psychiatry, weight control, and neonatal intermediate care. The hospital also includes the Center for Heart and Vascular Care, the first cardiac unit in the county.

In 2007, the center staffed 182 hospital beds and had 50,069 outpatient visits, as well as 38,804 emergency room visits. That year there were 5,196 inpatient surgeries and 1,601 babies born at the hospital. Kaiser Sunnyside discharged 14,557 people and had a total of 57,425 patient days. As of October 2008, the facility had approximately 2,400 employees.

== See also ==
- List of hospitals in Oregon
- Kaiser Westside Medical Center
