= RRMC =

RRMC may refer to:

- Raven Rock Mountain Complex, a United States government facility in Liberty Township, Pennsylvania, United States
- Rogue Regional Medical Center, a hospital in Medford, Oregon, United States
- Rapides Regional Medical Center, a hospital in Alexandria, Louisiana, United States
- Rolls-Royce Motor Cars, an automotive company in Goodwood, West Sussex, England
- Royal Roads Military College
- Rutland Regional Medical Center
- Radiobioassay and Radiochemical Measurements Conference
