= Cottage Grove Community Hospital =

Coordinates: 43.803881°N 123.03933°W

- PeaceHealth

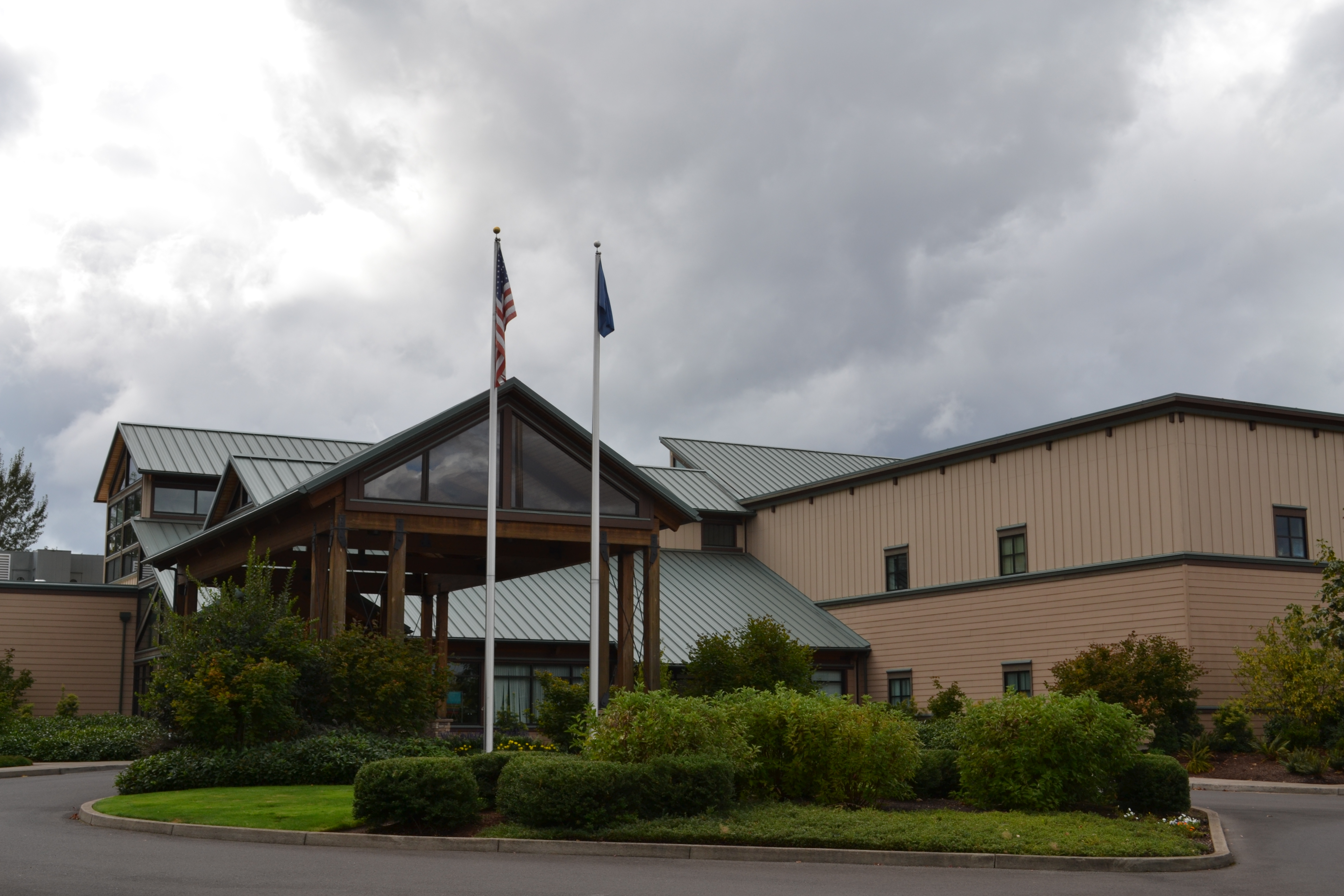
- Hospital in 2011

Geography
- Location: 1515 Village Drive, Cottage Grove, Oregon, United States

Organization
- Care system: Private, non-profit
- Type: Community

Services
- Emergency department: 24-hour, minor trauma
- Beds: 14 inpatient

History
- Opened: October 7, 2003

Links
- Website: http://www.peacehealth.org/Oregon/WhoWeAreCGH.htm
- Lists: Hospitals in Oregon

Cottage Grove Community Hospital was founded by PeaceHealth after the existing community hospital declared bankruptcy. It is located in Cottage Grove, Oregon, in southern Lane County. The facility provides 24-hour emergency care and a 14-bed inpatient unit.

This hospital is not part of the Oregon state trauma system. Major trauma patients are transported to Sacred Heart Medical Center in Springfield.

== See also ==
- List of hospitals in Oregon
