= Ashland Community Hospital =

Ashland Community Hospital may refer to one of the following hospitals in the United States:

- Ashland Community Hospital (Kentucky), see List of hospitals in Kentucky
- Ashland Community Hospital (Oregon)
