= Ashland Community Hospital (Oregon) =

Coordinates: 42.206277°N 122.724951°W

- Asante
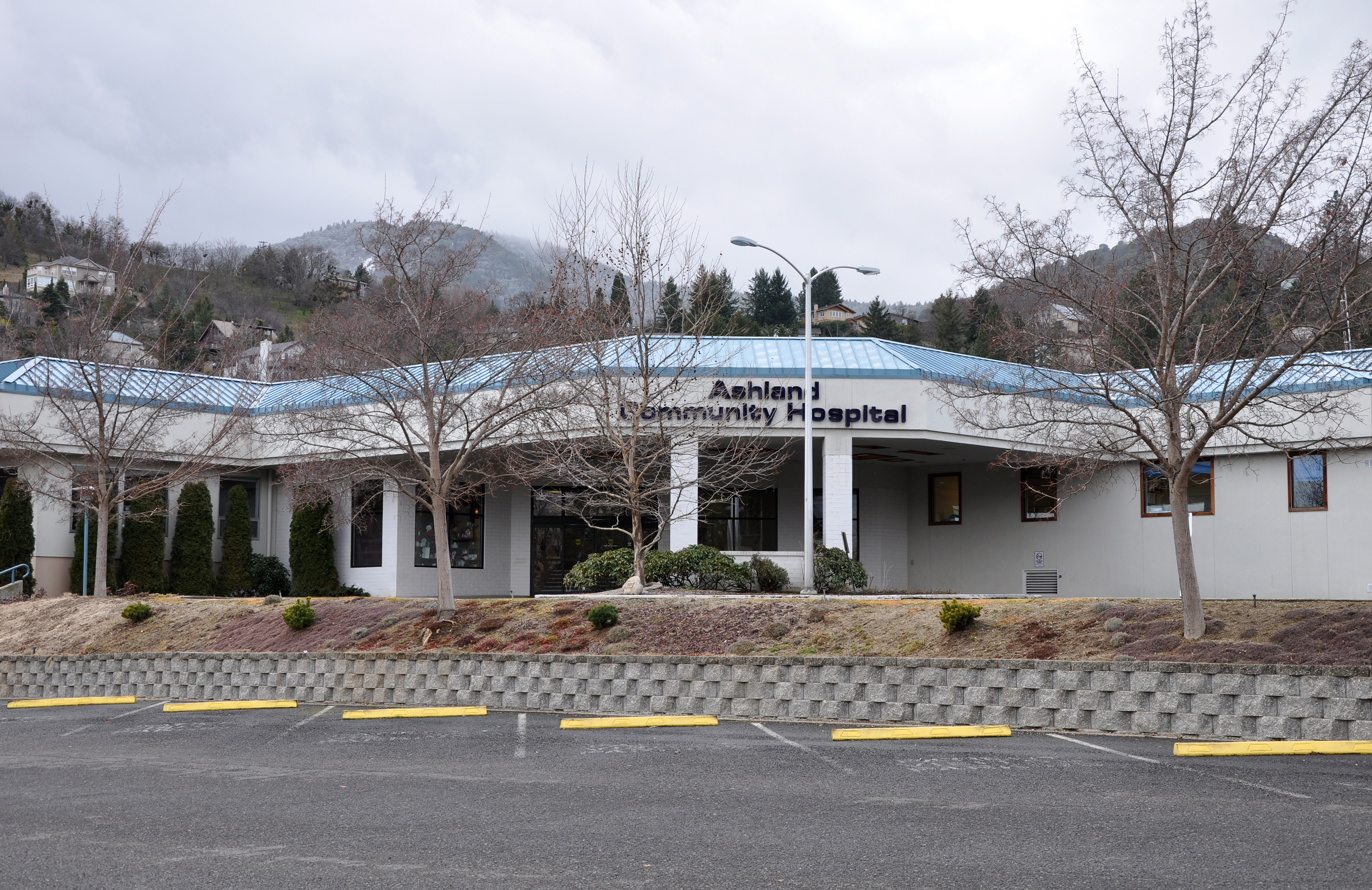
- Hospital entrance

Geography
- Location: Ashland, Oregon, United States

Organization
- Care system: Private hospital
- Type: Community hospital

Services
- Emergency department: Level IV trauma center
- Beds: 49

History
- Founded: 1907

Links
- Website: http://www.asante.org/Locations/location-detail/asante-ashland-community-hospital/
- Lists: Hospitals in Oregon

Asante Ashland Community Hospital is a hospital in Ashland, Oregon, United States. Founded in 1907, it is part of the Asante Health System. In 2012, it explored an affiliation with Dignity Health, with the latter stopping negotiations in October 2012 over some resistance to the plan. On November 15, 2012, Ashland Community Hospital chose to partner with Asante, the owner of Three Rivers Medical Center and Rogue Regional Medical Center, to build a stronger financial base for the hospital. Ashland's city council approved the transfer to Asante in June 2013.

The hospital has 49 beds for inpatients, a diagnostic and surgery center with imaging equipment, a laboratory, and equipment for respiratory testing and surgery. Outpatient services cover internal medicine, family medicine, endocrinology, general surgery, orthopedic surgery and wound care.

After restructuring in 2026, it functions as a satellite campus of Rogue Regional Medical Center and provides an emergency room with some outpatient services.

== See also ==
- List of hospitals in Oregon
