= List of hospitals in Oregon =

This list of hospitals in Oregon (U.S. state) is not complete.

== Operating ==
Image	City	County	Hospital	Beds available	Beds licensed	Trauma level
	Beaverton	Washington	Cedar Hills Hospital			
	Ontario	Malheur	Saint Alphonsus Medical Center - Ontario			
	Baker City	Baker	Saint Alphonsus Medical Center - Baker CIty			
	Portland	Multnomah	Vibra Specialty Hospital			
	Albany	Linn	Samaritan Albany General Hospital	64	76	3
	Ashland	Jackson	Ashland Community Hospital	37	49	4
	Astoria	Clatsop	Columbia Memorial Hospital	25	49	3
	Baker City	Baker	St. Elizabeth Health Services	25	36	4
	Bandon	Coos	Southern Coos Hospital and Health Center	19	21	3
	Bend	Deschutes	St. Charles Medical Center - Bend	226	231	2
	Burns	Harney	Harney District Hospital	25	25	4
	Clackamas	Clackamas	Kaiser Sunnyside Medical Center	182	196	
	Coos Bay	Coos	Bay Area Hospital	129	172	3
	Coquille	Coos	Coquille Valley Hospital	25	25	4
	Corvallis	Benton	Good Samaritan Regional Medical Center	134	188	2
	Cottage Grove	Lane	Cottage Grove Community Hospital	14	14	
	Dallas	Polk	West Valley Hospital	6	15	4
	Enterprise	Wallowa	Wallowa Memorial Hospital	25	25	4
	Florence	Lane	Peace Harbor Hospital	21	21	4
	Forest Grove	Washington	Tuality Forest Grove Hospital	144	215	
	Gold Beach	Curry	Curry General Hospital	24	24	4
	Grants Pass	Josephine	Three Rivers Medical Center	98	125	3
	Gresham	Multnomah	Legacy Mount Hood Medical Center	80	115	
	Heppner	Morrow	Pioneer Memorial Hospital	12	12	4
	Hermiston	Umatilla	Good Shepherd Healthcare System	25	49	3
	Hillsboro	Washington	Kaiser Westside Medical Center		126	
	Hillsboro	Washington	Hillsboro Medical Center (formerly Tuality Community Hospital)	144	215	
	Hood River	Hood River	Providence Hood River Memorial Hospital	25	25	3
	John Day	Grant	Blue Mountain Hospital	16	25	4
	Klamath Falls	Klamath	Sky Lakes Medical Center (formerly: Merle West Medical Center)	131	176	3
	La Grande	Union	Grande Ronde Hospital	25	25	4
	Lakeview	Lake	Lake District Hospital	24	24	4
	Lebanon	Linn	Samaritan Lebanon Community Hospital	25	49	4
	Lincoln City	Lincoln	Samaritan North Lincoln Hospital	25	25	4
	Madras	Jefferson	St. Charles Medical Center – Madras	31	33	4
	McMinnville	Yamhill	Willamette Valley Medical Center	67	80	3
	Medford	Jackson	Providence Medford Medical Center	128	168	3
	Medford	Jackson	Rogue Regional Medical Center	378	378	2
	Milwaukie	Clackamas	Providence Milwaukie Hospital	66	77	
	Newberg	Yamhill	Providence Newberg Medical Center	40	40	4
	Newport	Lincoln	Samaritan Pacific Communities Hospital	25	25	4
	Ontario	Malheur	St. Alphonsus Medical Center	49	49	4
	Oregon City	Clackamas	Providence Willamette Falls Medical Center	91	143	
	Pendleton	Umatilla	Eastern Oregon Psychiatric Center			
	Pendleton	Umatilla	St. Anthony Hospital	49	49	3
	Portland	Multnomah	Adventist Medical Center	252	302	
	Portland	Multnomah	Doernbecher Children's Hospital			
	Portland	Multnomah	Legacy Emanuel Medical Center	410	554	1
	Portland	Multnomah	Legacy Good Samaritan Medical Center	254	539	
	Portland	Multnomah	Oregon Health & Science University Hospital	524	560	1
	Portland	Multnomah	Providence Portland Medical Center	374	483	
	Beaverton (nearest city)	Washington	Providence St. Vincent Medical Center	552	552	
	Portland	Multnomah	Portland Shriners Hospital			
	Portland	Multnomah	Veterans Affairs Medical Center			
	Prineville	Crook	St. Charles Medical Center - Prineville	25	35	4
	Redmond	Deschutes	St. Charles Medical Center - Redmond	48	48	3
	Reedsport	Douglas	Lower Umpqua Hospital District	16	16	4
	Roseburg	Douglas	Mercy Medical Center	129	174	3
	Roseburg	Douglas	Veterans Affairs Roseburg Healthcare System			
	Salem	Marion	Oregon State Hospital		704	
	Salem	Marion	Salem Hospital	390	494	2
	Seaside	Clatsop	Providence Seaside Hospital	25	34	
	Silverton	Marion	Legacy Silverton Medical Center	48	49	4
	Springfield	Lane	McKenzie-Willamette Medical Center	112	114	3
	Springfield	Lane	Sacred Heart Medical Center at RiverBend	412	432	2
	Stayton	Marion	Santiam Hospital	40	40	4
	The Dalles	Wasco	Adventist Health Columbia Gorge	49	49	3
	Tillamook	Tillamook	Adventist Health Tillamook	25	49	3
	Tualatin	Clackamas	Legacy Meridian Park Medical Center	128	150	

== Defunct ==
Image	Hospital	County	City	Closed
	Bess Kaiser Hospital	Multnomah	Portland	1998
	Dammasch State Hospital	Clackamas	Wilsonville	1995
	Eastmoreland Hospital	Multnomah	Portland	2004
	Legacy Holladay Park Medical Center	Multnomah	Portland	1994
	Morningside Hospital	Multnomah	Portland	1968
	New Lincoln Hospital	Lincoln	Toledo	c. 1984
	Oregon Hospital for the Insane	Multnomah	Portland	1883
	Oregon State Tuberculosis Hospital	Marion	Salem	1969
	Pacific Christian Hospital	Lane	Eugene	1936
	Physicians & Surgeons Hospital	Multnomah	Portland	1986
	St. Helens Hospital and Health Center	Columbia	St. Helens	1990
	Umpqua Valley Community Hospital	Douglas	Myrtle Creek	1991
	University Tuberculosis Hospital	Multnomah	Portland	1963
	Woodland Park Hospital	Multnomah	Portland	2006

== See also ==
- List of hospitals in Portland, Oregon
- Lists of Oregon-related topics
