= Providence Willamette Falls Medical Center =

- Providence Health & Services

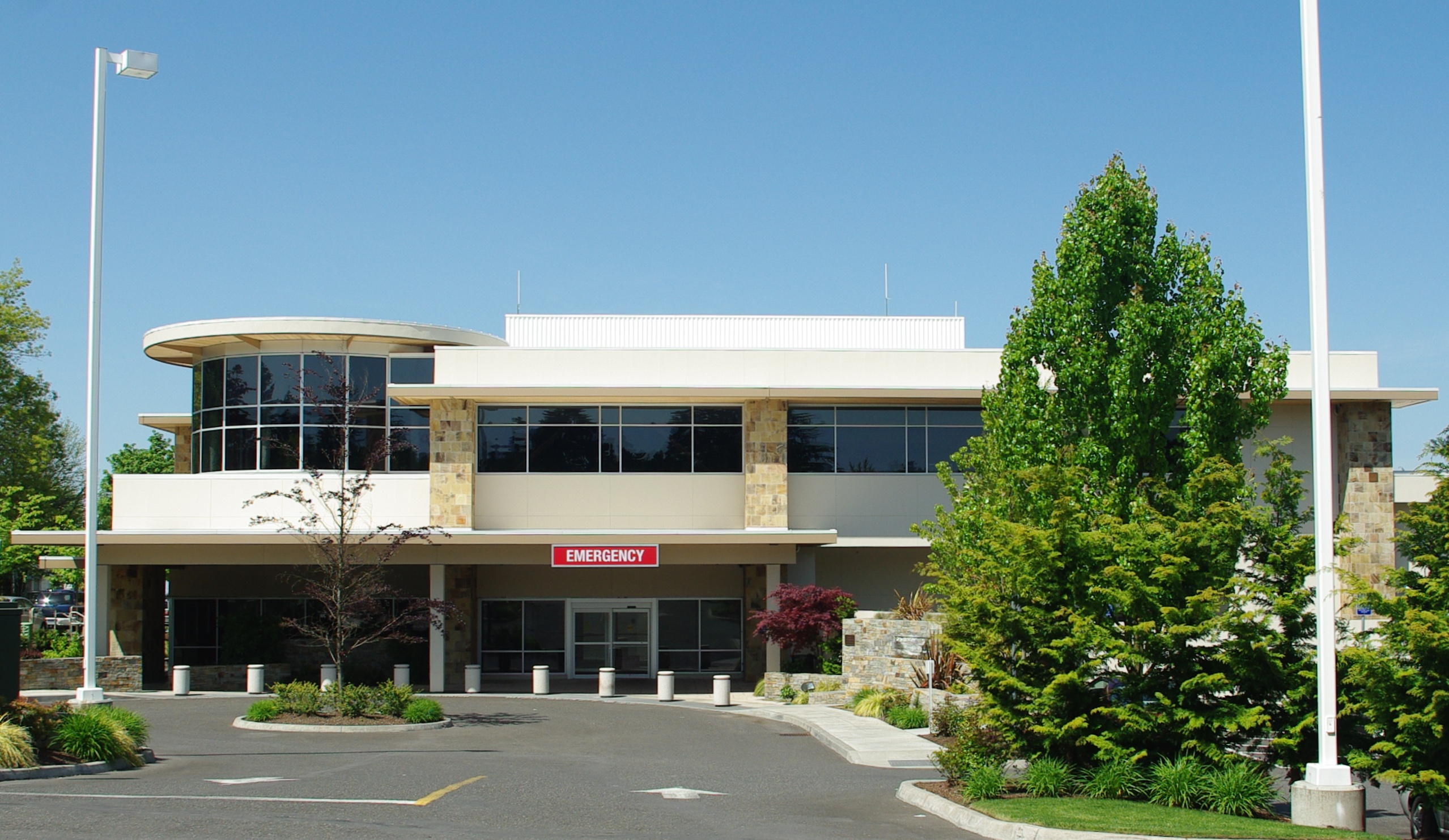
- Emergency department entrance

Geography
- Location: Oregon City, Clackamas County, Oregon, United States
- Coordinates: 45°21′23″N 122°35′11″W

Organization
- Care system: Medicare/Medicaid/Charity/Public
- Type: General
- Affiliated university: None

Services
- Emergency department: Acute
- Beds: 143

History
- Opened: 1954

Links
- Lists: Hospitals in Oregon

Providence Willamette Falls Medical Center (Willamette Falls) is a not-for-profit acute care hospital operated by Providence Health & Services in Oregon City, Oregon, United States. Established in 1954 as Doctors' Hospital, the hospital moved to its current location in 1961 and has 143 licensed beds at its 243,000-square-foot (22,600 m^{2}) facility. Willamette Falls also operates several medical offices and clinics outside of Oregon City in other parts of Clackamas County. Previously known as Willamette Falls Hospital, the hospital merged with Providence in 2009.

== History ==
Hutchinson General Hospital was started in 1918 in Oregon City by Ida Hutchinson as a maternity hospital. In 1954, Hutchinson was purchased by eight doctors who turned the hospital into a non-profit facility and changed the name to Doctors' Hospital. They then worked to raise capital to build a new hospital, culminating in the opening of Willamette Falls Community Hospital in 1961. In 1985, the hospital opened an immediate care clinic as well as hospice care. They built an off-site medical office building in Clackamas in 1988. Willamette Falls added a new birthing center in 1990 and a 44,000-square-foot (4,100 m^{2}) medical building in 1995. A health education center opened in 2000, along with a $10 million renovation to the surgical department.

A second medical building was added in 2002, followed by a redesign of the main entrance in 2005. The hospital was sued in 2004 by the Arc of Oregon over claims the hospital refused to treat some patients with mental disabilities. In May 2005, the hospital announced plans to build a $7 million medical center in neighboring Canby, with construction beginning in June 2006 on the center that would include an urgent care clinic and imaging. The hospital opened a new emergency department in January 2006 that expanded the emergency department to 19 beds at a cost of $20 million. The clinic opened in June 2007. The hospital reported an operating loss for the third consecutive year in 2007.

In November 2008, the hospital announced plans for the next 20 years that included an expansion that would nearly double the size of the facility. Later that month, the hospital looked to merge with Providence Health & Services. The two organizations signed an agreement to make the merge happen in May 2009, with a planned completion to occur before the end of 2009. After the Oregon Attorney General approved the merger, the hospital joined Providence on October 1, 2009, and was renamed as Providence Willamette Falls Medical Center.

== Details ==
The 143 licensed hospital bed center is accredited by The Joint Commission and employs over 750 people, with over 300 doctors with privileges. Services at the 243,000-square-foot (22,600 m^{2}) facility include general surgical and medical, ICU, an emergency department, birthing center, hospice, obstetrics, child and adolescent psychiatry, MRI and CT imaging, and oncology among others. In addition to the main hospital, the group operates a medical clinic in Canby and an immediate care center in Oregon City. The hospital is a not for-profit organization managed by a 15-person board of directors.

In 2006, the hospital had a net loss of $48,000 on gross patient revenues of $138 million with $1.5 million in charity care. In 2007, the center staffed 91 hospital beds and had 137,325 outpatient visits, as well as 27,432 emergency department visits. That year there were 1,447 surgeries and 1,115 babies born at the hospital.

== See also ==
- List of hospitals in Oregon
