= Sky Lakes Medical Center =

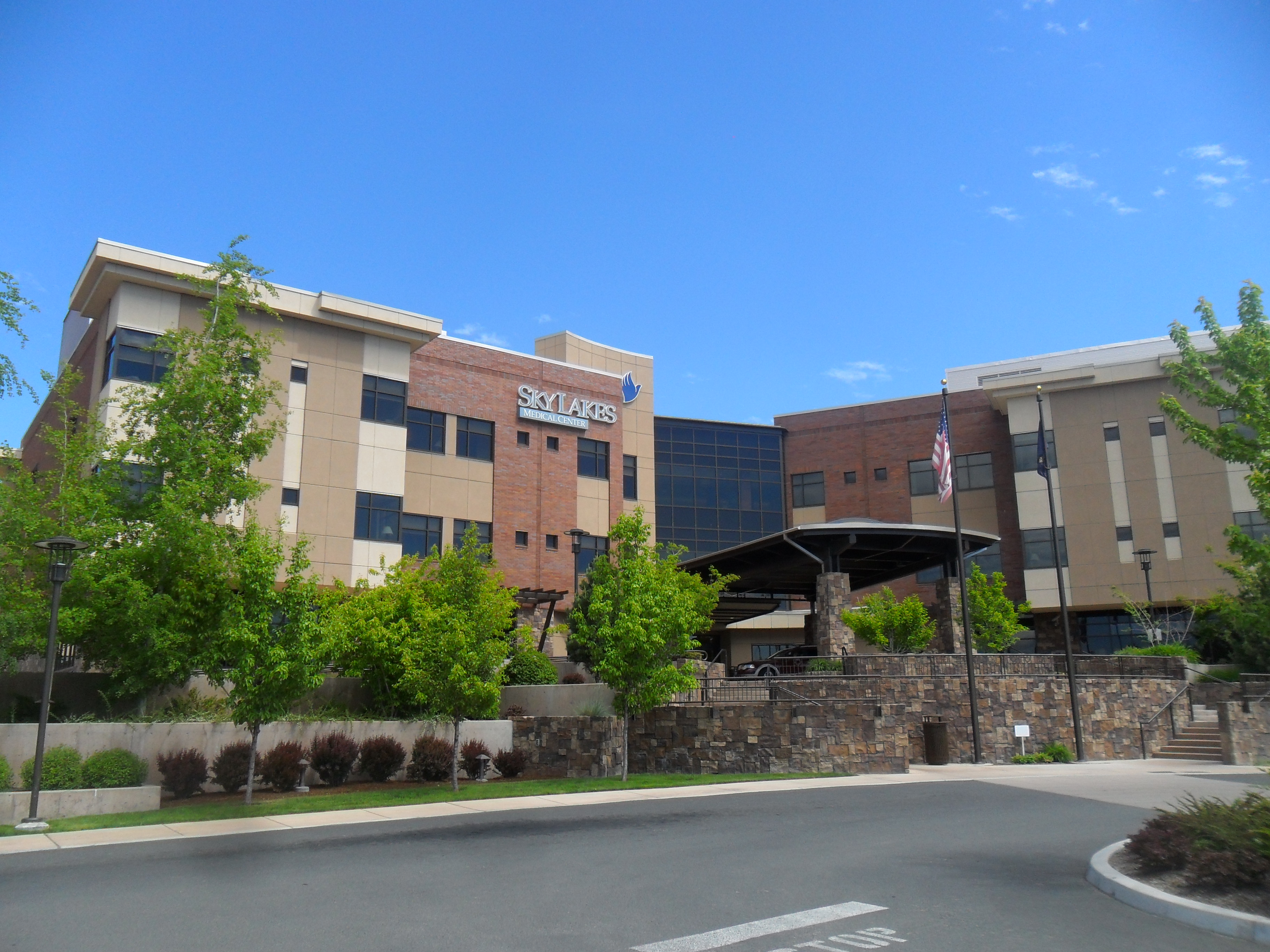
- Sky Lakes Medical Center

Geography
- Location: 2865 Daggett Avenue, Klamath Falls, Oregon, United States
- Coordinates: 42°15′14.52″N 121°47′04.01″W

Organization
- Care system: Community-based non-profit
- Type: General, Surgical, Teaching
- Affiliated university: Oregon Health & Science University

Services
- Emergency department: Level III trauma center
- Beds: 176

Helipads
- Helipad: (FAA LID: 9OR3)

History
- Opened: 1968

Links
- Website: skylakes.org
- Lists: Hospitals in Oregon

Sky Lakes Medical Center (formerly Merle West Medical Center) is a 176-bed hospital located in Klamath Falls, Oregon, United States. Sky Lakes is also a teaching hospital affiliated with Oregon Health & Science University Medical School through the Cascades East Rural Family Medicine Residency Program. It is a community-owned medical center that serves the healthcare needs of an area of approximately 10,000 square miles (26,000 km^{2}) in Oregon and northern California. The hospital was founded in 1965 and incorporated in 1968.

Sky Lakes Medical Center provides a birthing center, Blood Bank, Cardiac Catherization Lab, General - Acute Care, Intensive Care Unit, Computerized Tomography Scan, Magnetic Resonance Imaging (MRI), Mammography & Radiology/Diagnostic-Imaging/MRI/X-Ray, Nuclear Medicine, Occupational Therapy, Orthopedics, Outpatient Services, Radiation Therapy, Wellness/Health&Fitness Center. The hospital is equipped with a FAA LID: 9OR3 Heliport on its campus.

Besides patient care, Sky Lakes also carries out medical research and offers practicum positions for family medicine residents and nursing students through its affiliation with the Oregon Health & Science University.

== Location ==
Sky Lakes Medical Center is located adjacent to the Oregon Institute of Technology in the northwest part of Klamath Falls. The hill lies on the southeast shore of the Upper Klamath Lake, accessed through U.S. Route 97. The hospital has a parking structure and three parking lots, the main lot being served by a shuttle service that ferries patients and visitors between their vehicles and the medical center. The hospital is served by two Basin Transit Service bus routes. It also has an ambulance bay and a helicopter landing pad.

== History ==
In the late 1950s, a citizen task force in Klamath County outlined the future healthcare needs of the region, and with a successful fund-drive constructed what is now Sky Lakes Medical Center, which opened in October 1965. In 1968, the hospital became a member of the American Hospital Association. It wasn't until the 1970s that the name was changed to Merle West Medical Center. The name of the hospital was changed to Sky Lakes Medical Center in May 2007.

== Services ==
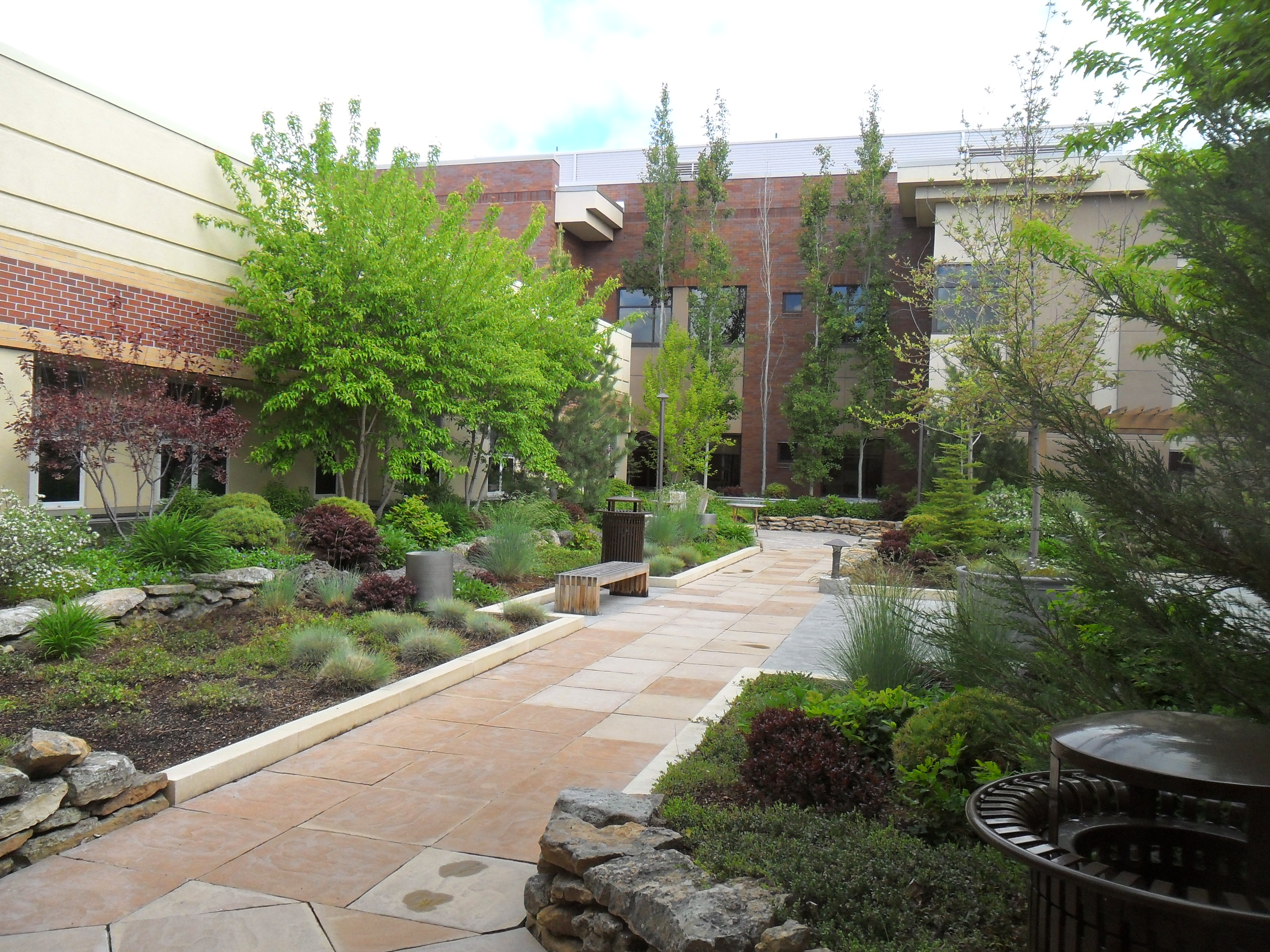
Sky Lakes Medical Center campus

The Emergency Department has 23 beds. Patients are usually referred to the hospital by their doctors or clinics for specialized care, but may also be admitted through the emergency department. Sky Lakes Medical Center reported 6,112 acute admissions in 2010 for a total of 20,738 patient days and a 3.39 average length of stay. That same year the hospital reported 6,741 surgical procedures and 23,248 emergency room visits.

Sky Lakes medical laboratory reported 395,941 laboratory tests and assays in 2010, while the medical imaging department reported 28,429 X-ray exams, 8,872 ultrasounds and 16,507 MRI and CT scans. Physical therapy reported 11,382 procedures in 2010 and the home health nursing program reported 814 nursing episodes.

Sky Lakes Medical Center sponsors several annual community health-related activities, including the "Living Well" community health fair with more than 50 exhibitors providing information and resources for the community, providing free eye, ear, blood glucose and cholesterol screenings, as well as blood pressure checks, body mass index readings and lung-function tests. The event usually provides car seat checks and medication evaluations also.

== Funding ==
Sky Lakes Medical Center is partially funded by the Sky Lakes Medical Center Foundation, a not-for-profit corporation founded in 1985 that adheres to the Association of Healthcare Philanthropy standards of professional ethics. The Sky Lakes Medical Center Foundation is the primary fundraising organization for the hospital, which receives donations by benefactors including former patients, other foundations and local business leaders.

== Education ==
Sky Lakes Medical Center is affiliated with the Oregon Health & Science University (OHSU) education and research branches, providing internship and practicum positions for over 20 resident physicians in pursuit of their family medicine specialty. Sky Lakes produces a continuing investment in Cascades East Family Medicine residents' program. The hospital also works with OHSU, Oregon Institute of Technology and Klamath Community College faculties, supplementing their nursing programs with hands-on clinical exposure.
