= Peace Harbor Hospital =

- PeaceHealth Medical Group
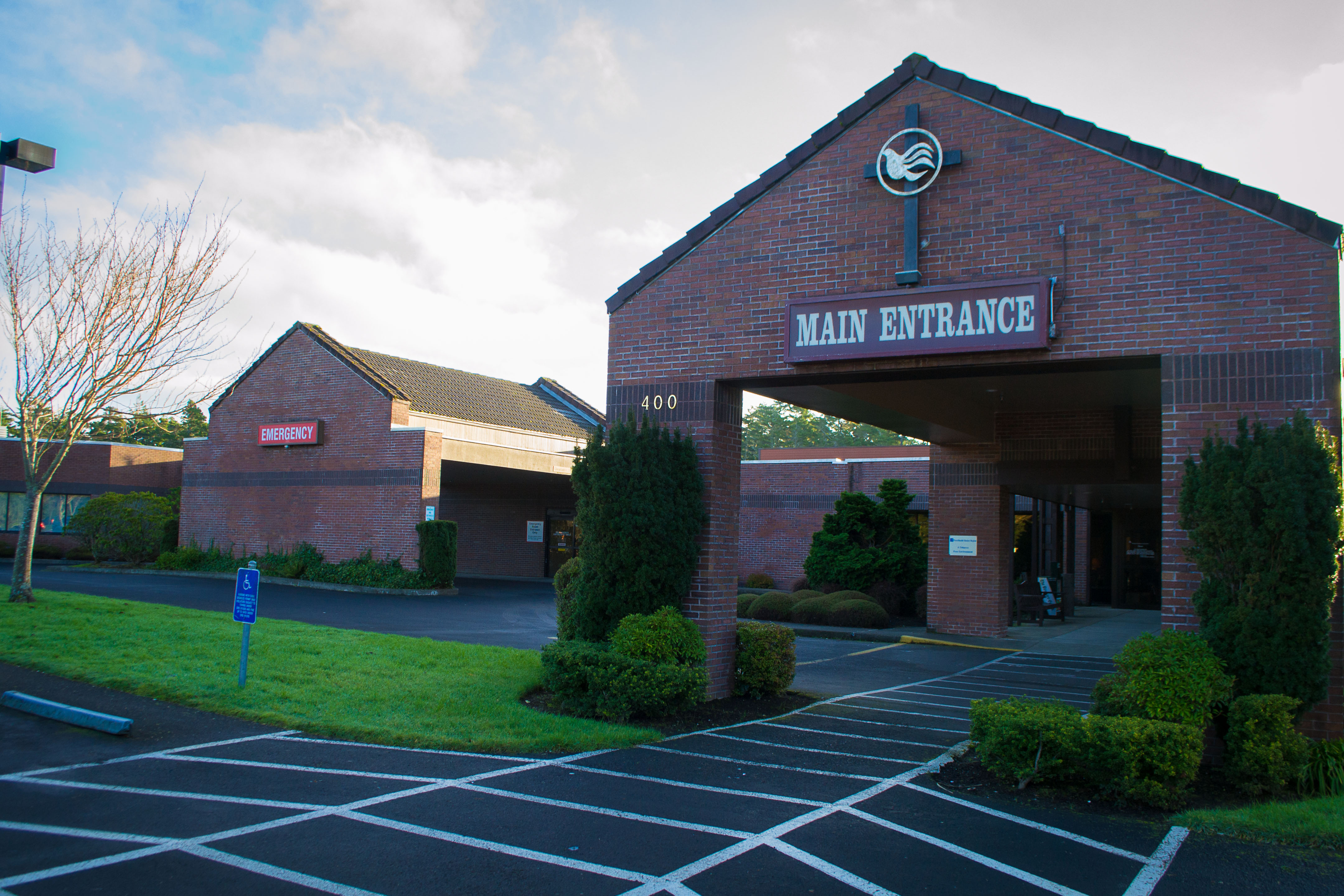

Geography
- Location: 400 Ninth Street, Florence, Oregon, United States
- Coordinates: 43.9752°N 124.1186°W

Organization
- Type: General

Services
- Emergency department: Level IV trauma center
- Beds: 21

History
- Opened: July 14, 1989

Links
- Website: http://www.peacehealth.org/siuslaw/WhoWeAre.htm
- Lists: Hospitals in Oregon

Peace Harbor Hospital is a 21-bed acute care facility and a Level IV Trauma Center. It is located in Florence, Oregon, and serves western Lane County, Oregon.

== Description ==
The State of Oregon Community Benefit Reporting documentation of 2017 states, "Peace Harbor serves the rural communities of: Florence, Mapleton, Swisshome, Westlake, Waldsport, Yachats, Deadwood and Reedsport. The Peace Harbor service area has 27,095 residents: 983 (4%) are preschoolers age 5 or younger, 2,509 (9%) are 5-19 years old, 11,620 (43%) are adults age 20-64 and 7,869 (29%) are seniors age 65+."

== History ==
Because district voters had rejected a $6 million levy to replace the existing 31-year-old Western Lane Hospital in 1983, the Lane Hospital Board sought assistance from private hospital corporations. According to the Siuslaw News, Peace Harbor Hospital is "owned and managed by HHS of Bellevue, Wash., a non-profit Catholic health care corporation which also operates Sacred Heart General Hospital in Eugene".

Local resident Don-Lee Davidson donated the 20-acre site for the hospital. In planning since 1983, construction on the $5.2 million Peace Harbor Hospital began on June 1, 1988, with official groundbreaking on June 15, 1988. Dedication ceremonies were held July 7, 1989.

The name "Peace Harbor" was selected for "its coastal theme, its connotation of care and its association with its parent organization", The Sisters of St. Joseph of Peace. In addition to 21 private rooms, "other improvements include an expanded emergency room, a radiology department with both ultrasound and mammography services".

Labor negotiations with the Oregon Nurses Association in 2017 went through federal mediation before a contract was approved.

Seismic upgrades were completed in 2021, with the hospital reporting, "Peace Harbor is prepared for a high-magnitude, Cascadia Subduction Zone earthquake".

== See also ==
- List of hospitals in Oregon
- Peace Harbor Hospital Heliport
