= Grande Ronde Hospital =

Coordinates: 45.31967°N 118.10561°W

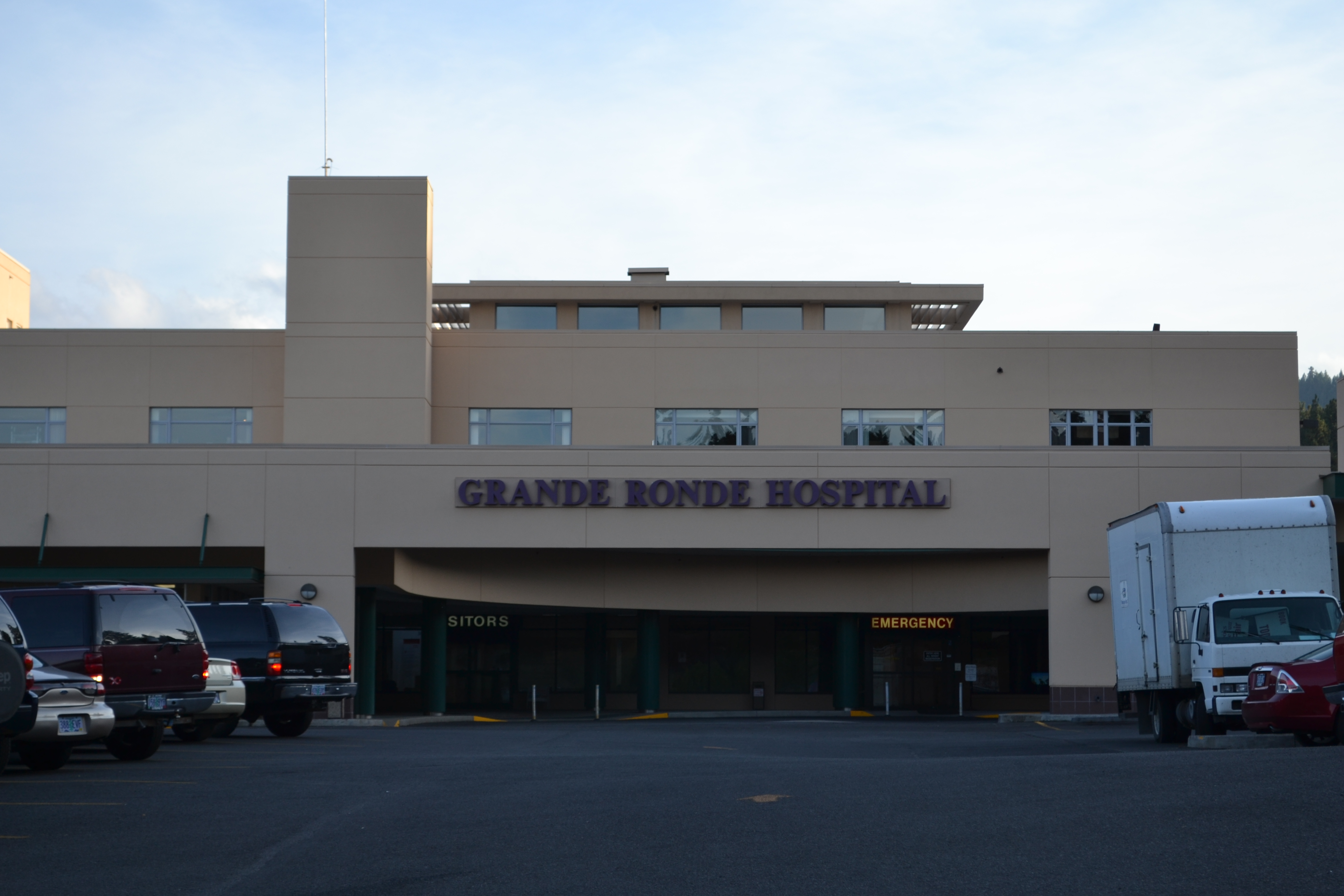

Geography
- Location: La Grande, Oregon, United States

Organization
- Care system: Private, non-profit
- Type: General

Services
- Emergency department: Level IV trauma center
- Beds: 25

History
- Opened: 1907

Links
- Website: www.grh.org
- Lists: Hospitals in Oregon

Grande Ronde Hospital provides medical services in La Grande, Oregon, United States. Founded and opened in 1907 and re-opened at a new location in 1966, the non-profit hospital offers inpatient care as well as a broad range of diagnostic, surgical, and therapeutic outpatient services. It has a family birthing center and provides home-care and hospice services.

The hospital is the only one in Union County, which covers 2,038 square miles (5,280 km^{2}) and has a population of more than 25,000. More than 700 people work at Grande Ronde Hospital. It is accredited by The Joint Commission (TJC) and is a member of the American Small Hospital Association.

== See also ==
- List of hospitals in Oregon
