= Providence Seaside Hospital =

- Providence Health & Services
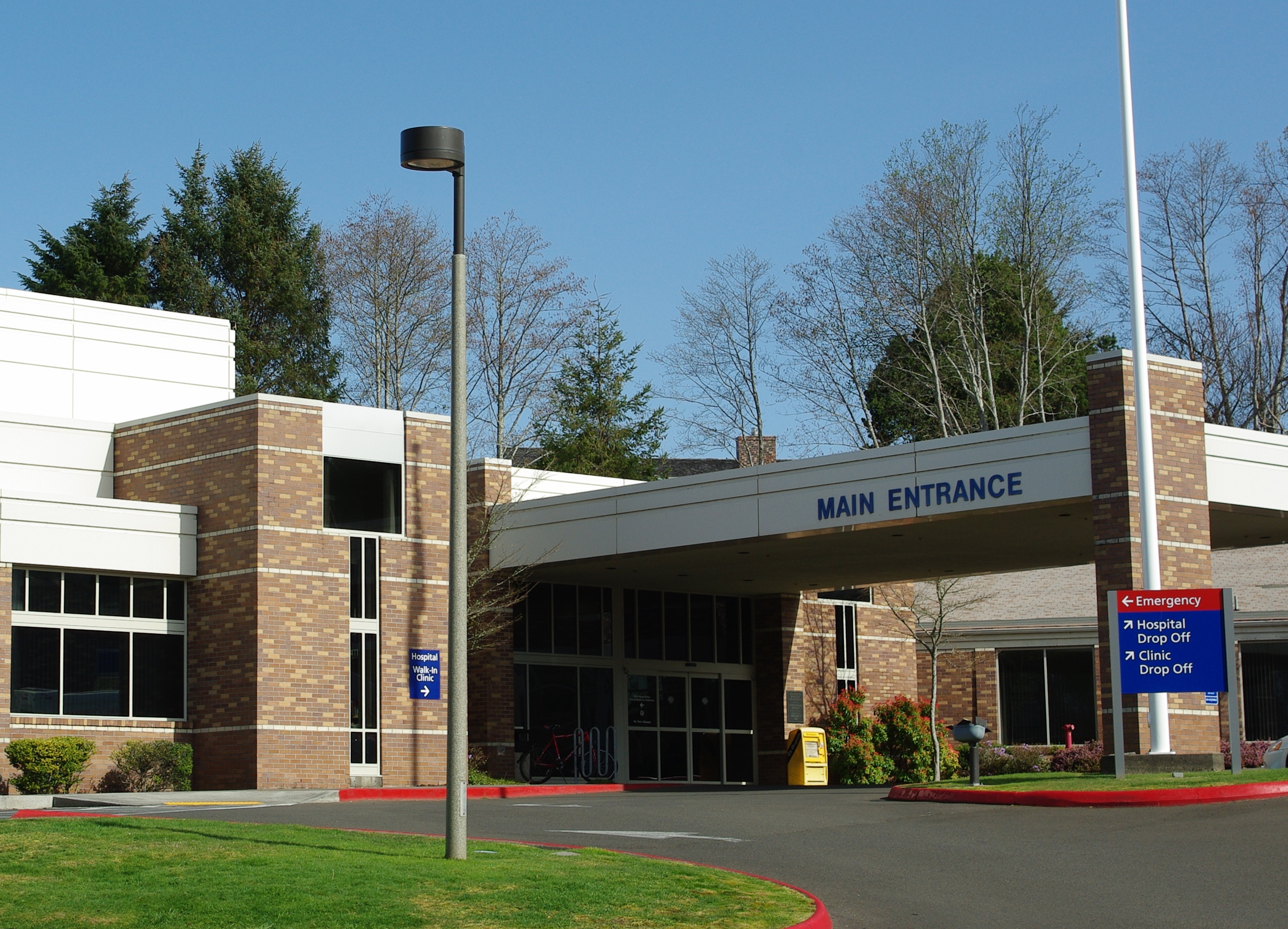

Geography
- Location: Seaside, Clatsop County, Oregon, United States
- Coordinates: 45.989°N 123.912°W

Organization
- Care system: Medicare/Medicaid/Charity/Public
- Type: General
- Affiliated university: None

Services
- Beds: 56

Links
- Website: Website
- Lists: Hospitals in Oregon

Providence Seaside Hospital, is a non-profit, general hospital in Seaside in the U.S. state of Oregon. The Critical Access Hospital on the Oregon Coast is part of Providence Health & Services' hospital network.

== History ==
Providence Seaside Hospital is a 24-bed critical-access hospital located on the Oregon coast in the resort community of Seaside. Just 75 minutes from Portland, this picturesque area is a favorite day-trip and vacation destination for people from Portland and beyond.

The Providence Seaside hospitalist program consists of daytime coverage only, with hospitalists working 7 a.m. to 7 p.m. Nights are covered through a collaborative effort involving community primary care physicians and support from emergency room physicians.

Nestled between the Pacific Ocean and the Coast Mountain Range, Seaside is a beautiful place to call home and a wonderful place to practice medicine.

In 1934, the former Mercer Hospital became Seaside Hospital. The city sold bonds in 1945 to pay for a new hospital, which opened the next year. In December 1967, the Oregon State Board of Health approved funds for a new facility to be located on land annexed into the city in January 1968. The hospital was previously located at South Franklin Street and S Avenue. Voters approved a $1.2 million bond in January 1968 to build a 55-bed hospital. A labor in February 2011 that started at the hospital led to a $1.9 million lawsuit when the baby died at a Portland hospital, with the lawsuit later settled.

== Details ==
The hospital is licensed for 56 beds, but operates 25 as of 2015. Services at Providence Seaside include maternity, surgical, imaging, emergency department, and pediatrics, among others. For 2014, the hospital had a total of 948 discharges, with 3,376 patient days, 111 surgeries, 109 births, and 9,023 emergency department visits. For 2014, the hospital had $91.6 million in charges, provided $2 million in charity care, and had an operating revenue of $1.6 million.

== See also ==
- List of hospitals in Oregon
