= Lake District Hospital =

Coordinates: 42.1814°N 120.3523°W

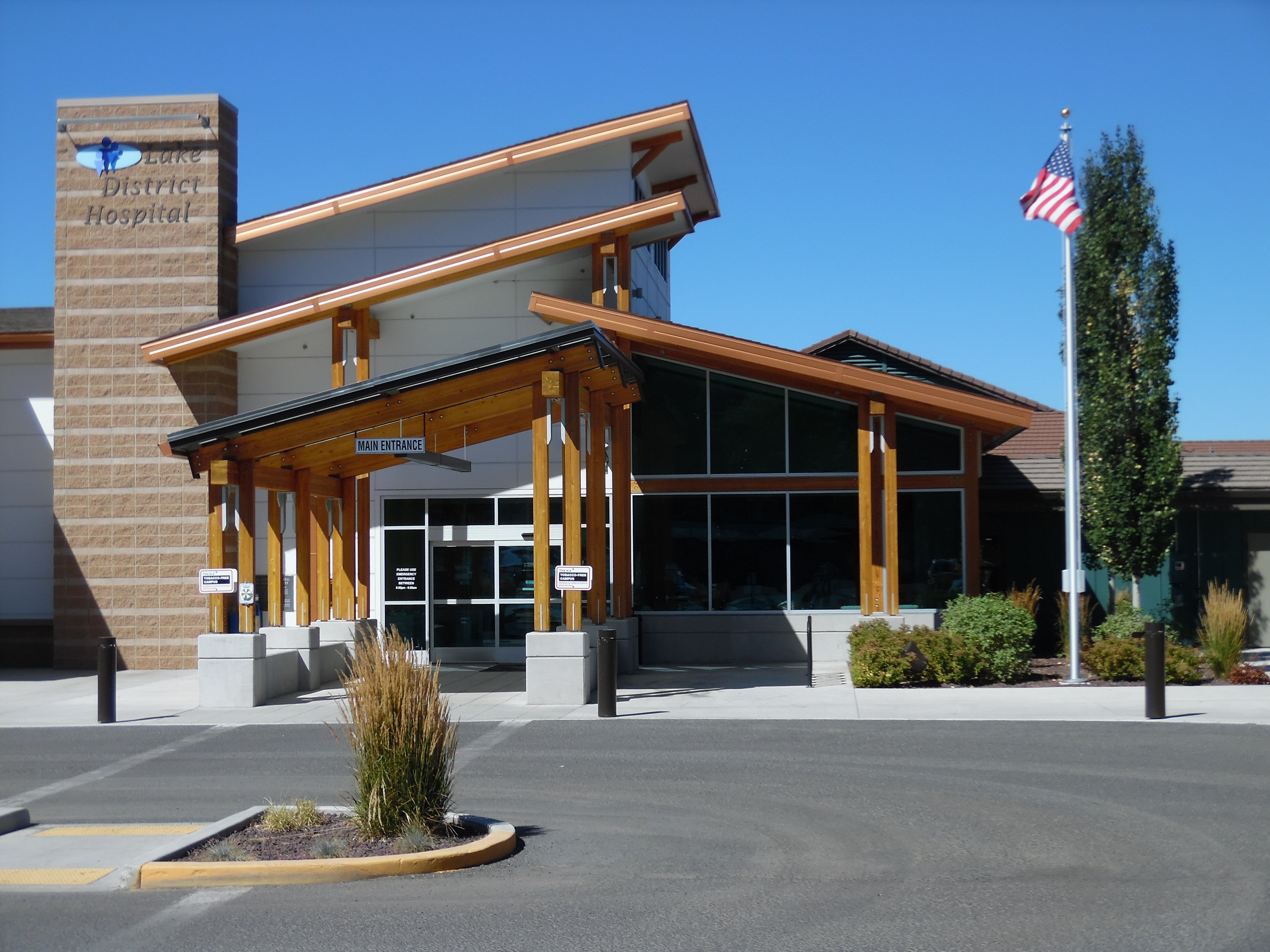
- Hospital main entrance, 2016

Geography
- Location: Lakeview, Oregon, Lake County, Oregon, United States

Organization
- Care system: Government-owned
- Type: General

Services
- Emergency department: Level IV trauma center
- Beds: 24

History
- Founded: 1971

Links
- Website: lakehealthdistrict.org
- Lists: Hospitals in Oregon

Lake District Hospital is an acute care hospital in Lakeview, Oregon, United States, opened in 1971.

Obstetrical services, surgery, emergency department and related services such laboratory work and x-rays are available at the hospital. The district, created in 1967, also includes an attached 47-bed unit for long-term care, a home health and hospice service, and outpatient services.

== See also ==
- List of hospitals in Oregon
