= Blue Mountain Hospital =

Coordinates: 44.417276°N 118.959312°W

- Blue Mountain Hospital District

Geography
- Location: John Day, Oregon, United States

Organization
- Care system: Community-based non-profit
- Type: General medical and surgical

Services
- Emergency department: Level IV trauma center
- Beds: 25

History
- Founded: 1949

Links
- Website: http://www.bluemountainhospital.org/
- Lists: Hospitals in Oregon

Blue Mountain Hospital offers medical services in John Day, Oregon, United States. Part of the Blue Mountain Hospital District, it was built in 1949 in Prairie City and re-built in 1960 in John Day. The hospital district, a non-profit managed by a local board of directors, includes Blue Mountain Nursing Home, a 52-bed unit in Prairie City.

The hospital has three monitored intensive-care beds, two birthing suites, and two surgery suites for inpatient and outpatient surgeries. It has a 24-hour emergency department, a helipad on site that can provide rapid transport in critical cases, and an ambulance service. The hospital also has a large bore MRI machine, installed in 2013. It offers outreach clinics in nearby communities and monthly clinics in John Day with physicians specializing in urology, orthopedics, gynecology, ophthalmology, cardiology, and podiatry.

== See also ==
- List of hospitals in Oregon
