= Providence Milwaukie Hospital =

- Providence Health & Services
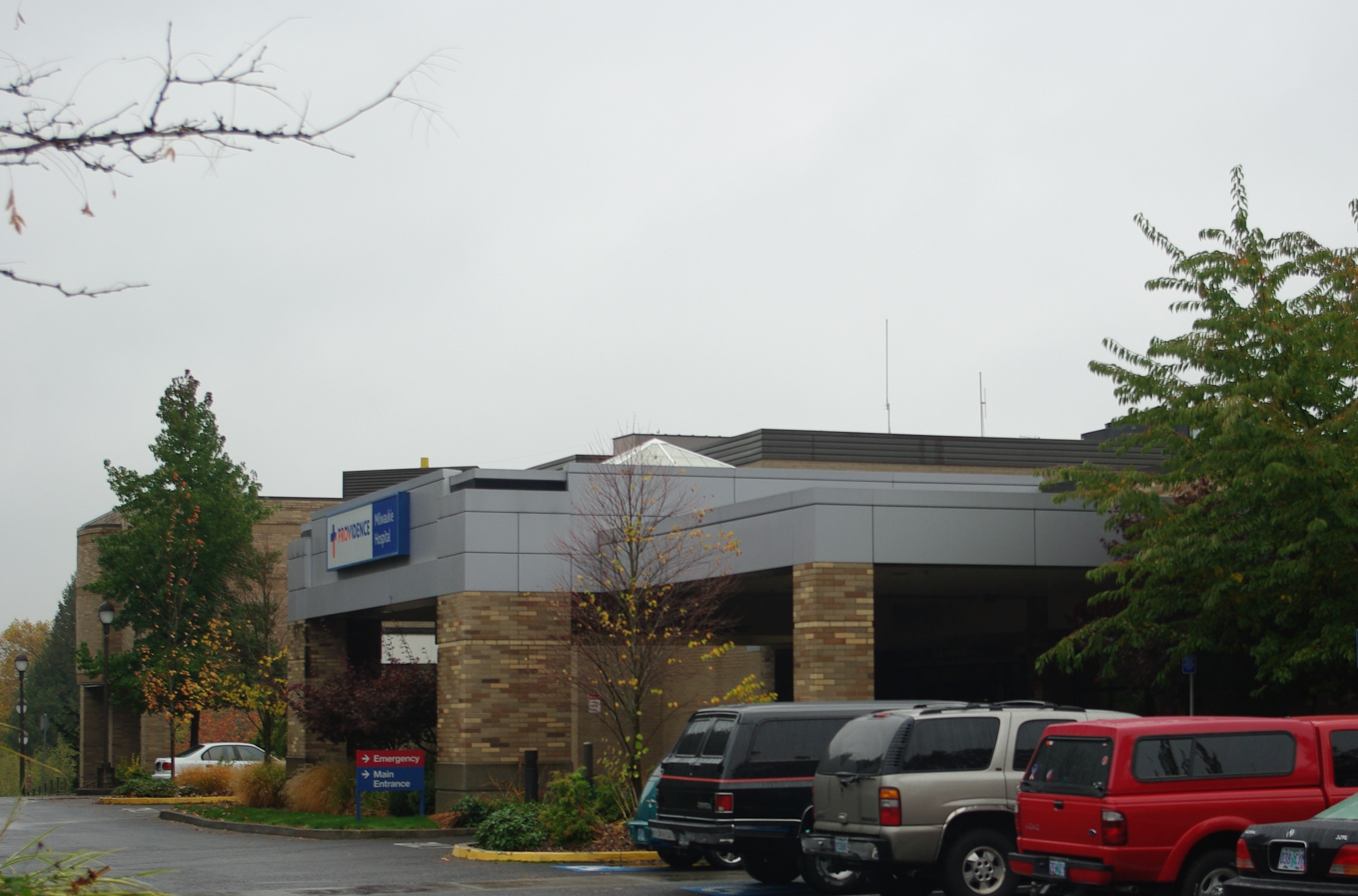
- Emergency Department entrance in 2009

Geography
- Location: Milwaukie, Oregon, United States
- Coordinates: 45.4494°N 122.6276°W

Organization
- Care system: Medicare; Medicaid; Charity; Public
- Type: General

Services
- Beds: 77 (licensed)

History
- Opened: 1968

Links
- Website: oregon.providence.org/patients/facilities/providence-milwaukie-hospital
- Lists: Hospitals in Oregon

Providence Milwaukie Hospital is a 77-bed acute care hospital in Milwaukie, Oregon, US. Located in the Portland metropolitan area, it is owned by Providence Health & Services. Opened in 1968, it was originally Dwyer Memorial Hospital, a private hospital, before becoming a community hospital a few years after opening.

== History ==
There were competing plans for a hospital in Milwaukie in the mid-1960s, with one being Milwaukie General Hospital to be built at Stanley and Railroad avenues, while Dwyer Memorial Hospital was planned for 32nd and Harrison streets. Plans for the Dwyer Memorial Hospital won out, with construction starting in May 1967 on what was to be an $800,000, 60-bed facility. The new 62-bed hospital opened in July 1968. The $1.5-million private hospital was named in honor of A J. Dwyer, an lumberman in Clackamas County. Dwyer was then transferred in July 1971 to North Clackamas Community Hospital, Inc., a non-profit organization established to run the formerly for-profit institution as a community hospital.

In 1980, a new emergency department opened with 10 examination rooms. The hospital changed its name to Dwyer Community Hospital in January 1982. The North Clackamas Community Hospital, which operated as Dwyer Community Hospital, started talks in January 1986 with then Providence Health Care System about merging into Providence, which was consummated later that year. The market share of the hospital was 1.5% for the Portland area in 1988. The hospital added a new surgical wing and entrance in 1997, part of a $15 million expansion project. Prior to the expansion, the hospital was only licensed for 56 beds.

Providence Milwaukie started construction on a three-story, 42,000-square-foot (3,900 m^{2}) building to house the Healing Place in February 2001. Labor strife with nurses over 19-months, including a one-day strike, ended in November 2003 with a new contract for the nurses. In May 2002, construction started on a new emergency department that was expected to cost $9 million and add 16,000 square feet (1,500 m^{2}) to the existing ER. Providence Milwaukie was named one of the top 100 hospitals in 2004 by Solucient.

== Details ==
The hospital is licensed for 77 beds, but as of 2013 only had 66 beds available. Services at Providence Milwaukie include radiology, surgery, emergency, cancer treatment, pediatrics, nuclear medicine, and sleep disorders, among others. For 2012, the hospital had a total of 3,129 acute care discharges, with 9,266 patient days, and 30,399 emergency department visits. For the fiscal year ending in 2011, the hospital had total revenues of $95 million and a profit of $10.6 million. That year Providence Milwaukie also provided $11.3 million in charity care.

== See also ==
- List of hospitals in Oregon
