= Columbia Memorial Hospital (Oregon) =

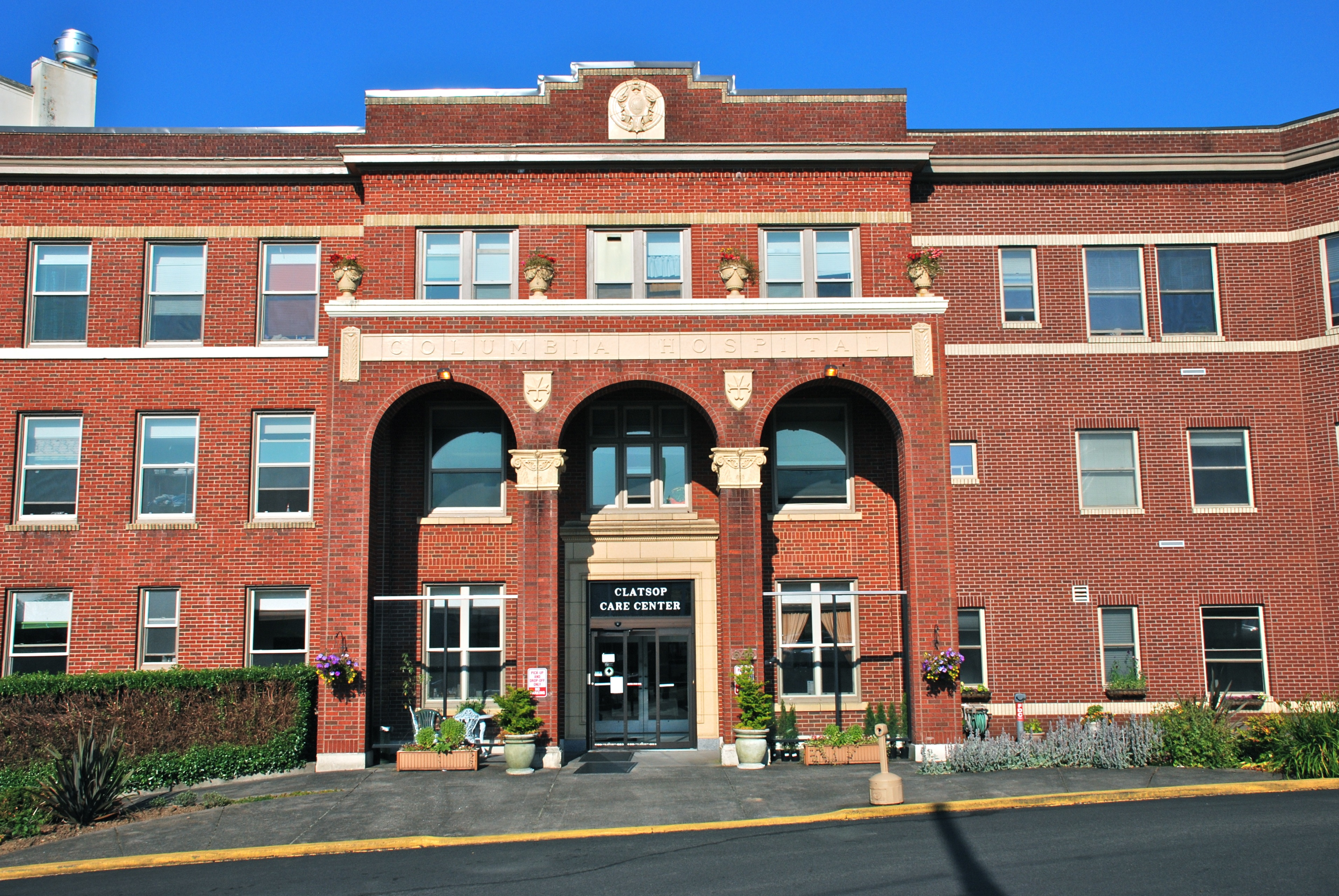
- Original Columbia Hospital before 1977

Geography
- Location: 2111 Exchange Street, Astoria, Oregon, United States
- Coordinates: 46.18816°N 123.81884°W

Organization
- Care system: Medicare/Medicaid
- Type: Acute Care

Services
- Emergency department: Level IV trauma center
- Beds: 25

History
- Opened: 1927

Links
- Website: Official website
- Lists: Hospitals in Oregon

Columbia Memorial Hospital (CMH) is a 25-bed medical facility in Astoria, Oregon. It is affiliated with the Evangelical Lutheran Church in America, Oregon Synod. The hospital has been serving families living and visiting the North Coast and Lower Columbia Region since 1880. A critical access hospital, its services include a level III trauma center.

== History ==
The start of the hospital came in 1880, when the Sisters of Providence founded St. Mary's Hospital in Astoria. It was the region's first and only hospital until the early 1900s. In 1919, the Finnish community started to raise money for a second hospital in Astoria, Columbia Hospital. The Finnish community was unable to raise enough funds, so the Lutheran Church's Augustana synod took over the fundraising. The hospital opened in 1927, located on 16th Street at Franklin Avenue. In 1958, operation of the hospital was taken over by a new corporation named Columbia Lutheran Charities, replacing the Augustana Lutheran Church. By at least 1970, the facility had been renamed Columbia Memorial Hospital.

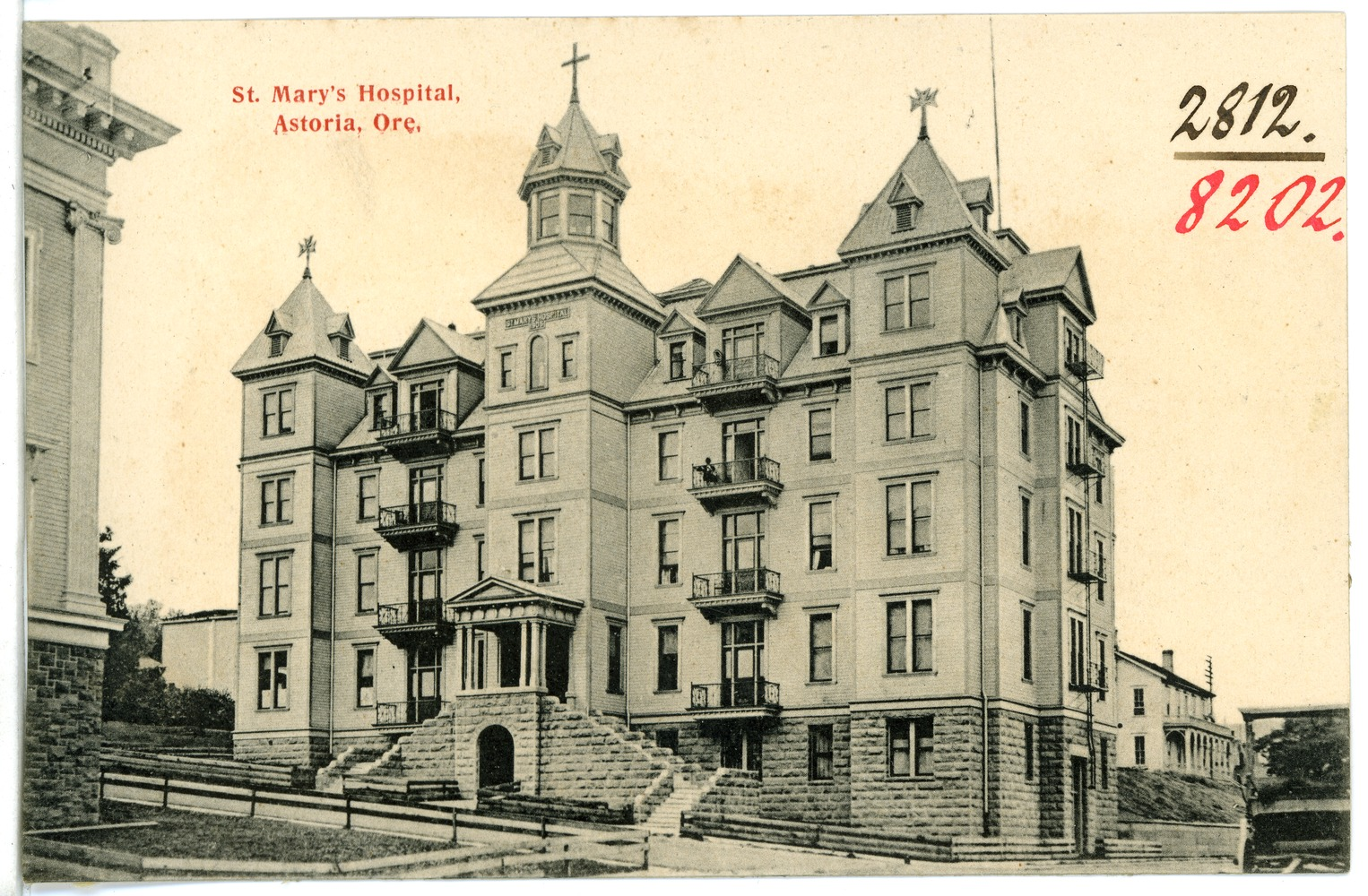
The 1905 St. Mary's Hospital.

In 1970, Columbia Lutheran Charities, by this time the hospital's owner, bought St. Mary's Hospital, which had been the first such facility in the city when it opened in 1880. At the time of this acquisition, that older hospital was located at 16th and Duane streets in a building constructed in 1931 adjacent to a 1905 building that replaced the original structure. The wood-frame 1905 building had already been out of use for several years.

In 1975, the hospital started a fundraising drive to provide funds for a new facility to replace the nearly 50-year-old existing buildings. Plans for the new $4.7 million facility were approved by the Oregon Health Commission in December 1975. In December 1977, the new hospital opened, replacing both the original Columbia Hospital and the former St. Mary's Hospital building. The old building at 16th and Franklin was turned into a nursing home and still stands today. The St. Mary's Hospital buildings, dating from 1905 and 1931, were demolished in 1975, as the plans for a new facility were advancing.

CMH underwent a $2 million renovation and expansion in the late 1990s. In 2013, it opened an urgent care and primary care clinic in nearby Warrenton, Oregon.

The hospital announced a new cancer clinic in Astoria to be operated jointly with Oregon Health & Science University in May 2015. The CMH-OHSU Knight Cancer Collaborative opened in October 2017 and offers comprehensive community cancer treatment for radiation oncology, medical oncology and infusion services for adult patients in the Columbia-Pacific region of Northwest Oregon and Southwest Washington.

One year later, in October 2018, CMH opened the Astoria Primary Care Clinic with five providers to meet the primary care needs of the community. CMH opened a Seaside facility, which includes an urgent care, pharmacy, primary care and multi-specialty clinic, in February 2020.

In 2021, CMH and OHSU announced an expanded partnership, although CMH remains an independent hospital. Under the new partnership, an OHSU faculty member sits on the CMH Board of Trustees, the chief medical officer at CMH serves as a liaison between CMH and OHSU, and most providers are now employed by OHSU under the CMH-OHSU Health name.

== Details ==
CMH is a not-for-profit, critical-access hospital that is licensed for 49 beds, but as of 2014 only had 25 beds available. Services at the facility include a level III trauma center. Other services include hospice care, maternity (labor and delivery), pharmacy, inpatient care and surgical care, among other services. The hospital sits on a campus just off U.S. Route 30 at 21st Street and includes a helipad.

CMH is the fastest growing rural hospital in the state of Oregon. It is one of only five remaining independent hospitals in the state. In addition to the 25-bed hospital, CMH includes 15+ clinics, many of which are part of its CMH-OHSU Health collaboration (although it remains an independent hospital). The clinics include specialties such as:

- Cancer Care (Medical Oncology and Radiation Oncology)
- Cardiology
- Endocrinology
- Orthopedics and Sports Medicine
- Pediatrics
- Podiatry
- Primary Care
- Pulmonology
- General Surgery
- Urgent Care
- Urology
- Women's Health

Other services at CMH include:

- Behavioral Health
- Diabetes Education
- Emergency
- Hospice
- Imaging (Radiology)
- Nutrition Therapy
- Respiratory Therapy
- Cardiac Rehab
- Speech Therapy
- Physical Therapy
- Occupational Therapy
- Sleep Studies
- Swing Bed Program

== See also ==
- List of hospitals in Oregon
