= Legacy Silverton Medical Center =

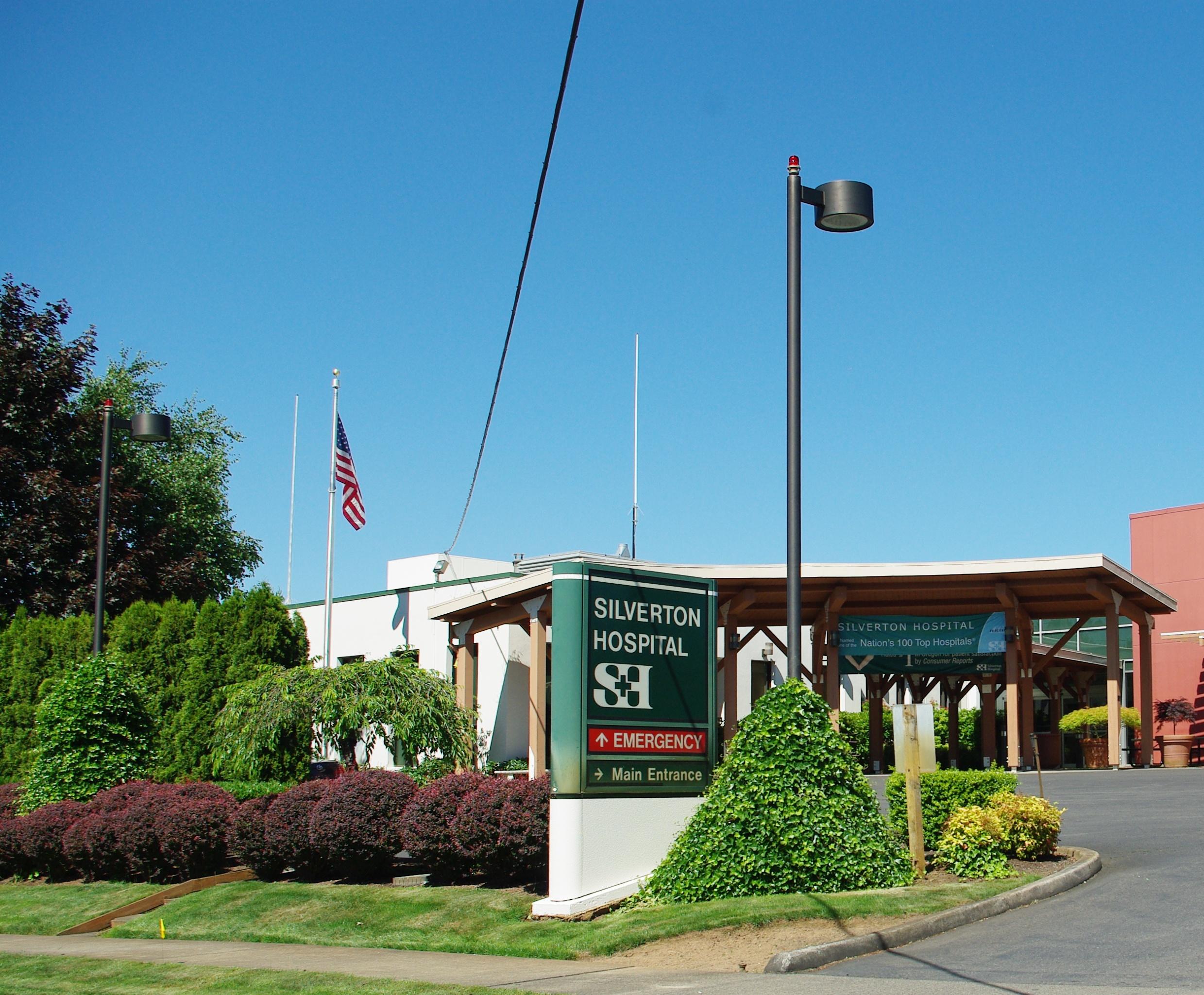
- Entrance

Geography
- Location: Silverton, Oregon, United States
- Coordinates: 44.1454°N 120.5834°W

Organization
- Care system: Community-owned, non-profit
- Type: General medical and surgical

Services
- Emergency department: Level IV trauma center
- Beds: 48

History
- Opened: 1917

Links
- Website: Official website
- Lists: Hospitals in Oregon

Legacy Silverton Medical Center, known as Silverton Hospital before its affiliation with Legacy Health System in 2016, is a nonprofit regional hospital located in Silverton, Oregon, United States. Founded in 1917, the 48-bed facility moved to its current location in 1938. The hospital includes a Level IV trauma center, a 24-hour emergency department, a family birth center, and diagnostic imaging.

== Services ==
Legacy Silverton Medical Center offers a comprehensive mix of services, many of which are not typically available in a small rural hospital, including:

- Diagnostic imaging
- Family birth center
- Foot care clinic
- General surgery
- Lab services
- Nutrition services
- Orthopedic/sports medicine
- Primary care
- Women's health
- Wound care & infusion services

== Awards and recognition ==
Since 2008, Legacy Silverton has earned recognition each year with the Press Ganey Summit Award, which is given to hospitals ranked in the top 5 percent for clinical performance and patient satisfaction.

== Controversies ==
The hospital reported in January 2015 that ten patients had been burned during surgeries due to unfiltered halogen lights in the operating room.
