= Curry General Hospital =

Hospital in Oregon, United States

Coordinates: 42°24′40.7″N 124°25′08.7″W

- Curry Health Network

Geography
- Location: 94220 4th St. Gold Beach, Oregon 97444, United States

Links
- Lists: Hospitals in the United States

Curry General Hospital in Gold Beach, Oregon, is a general medical and surgical acute care and critical access facility. It was founded in 1951, and has been part of the Curry Health Network since 1983. A new facility opened in May 2017, with "critical access status from the Centers for Medicare and Medicaid Services".

== History ==
Construction on the original hospital building, an unreinforced brick structure, began in 1949, with additional wings constructed in the 1950s and 60s. It began operation in 1951.

By 2013, the facility no longer met building codes or patient needs, and there was widespread community support to build a new hospital. Voters of Curry Health District passed a US$10 million general obligation bond issue in November 2013. Curry Health Network donated an additional US$521,000, and USDA Rural Development provided US$20.96 million in low-interest loans.

=== New building located in tsunami zone ===
In 2013, the State of Oregon first published its "Resilience Plan", which stated, "The majority of buildings in Oregon have not been designed to resist the shaking from a magnitude 9.0 Cascadia earthquake." Early in 2014, state officials began asking questions about the proposed site local officials had chosen for the new Curry General Hospital, which was four blocks from the ocean, inside Oregon's proposed tsunami zone.

Hospital and city officials had rejected alternative sites for two basic reasons: prohibitive costs of construction on higher ground, and ease of access for aging residents. They also cited mitigating conditions built into their plan: "New plans for the building also include high seismic standards, like piles being sunk deep under ground for stabilization in the event of a large quake. Important mechanics, like the HVAC system, will also be placed on the roof, to keep them as far away from any water as possible."

According to Kristian Foden-Vencil, of Oregon Public Broadcasting, "The building is about 50 feet above sea level. Scientists estimate that waves from a 9.0 subduction earthquake off the coast of Oregon could reach between 60 and 100 feet above sea level."

=== Construction completed, 2017 ===
In 2014, the hospital served a population base of about 22,000. In April 2014, Erdman Co. of Wisconsin was selected to design and build a new US$20 million building. Groundbreaking for the new building took place in May 2015, and the community celebrated ribbon cutting for the new state-of-the-art hospital on April 1, 2017. The multi-story critical care hospital and clinic provides 62,000-square-feet of space for medical specialist and modern equipment, including a new CT scanner.

With a total investment in the building and equipment of approximately US$34.8 million, the building has 18 inpatient beds, and an emergency department about ten times larger than the one in the original building.

=== Covid-19 response ===
When the State of Oregon halted all elective surgical procedures in March 2020, Curry General Hospital experienced an approximate 50% drop in revenue.

On March 15, the hospital announced screening exams and appropriate testing for COVID-19 were available after flu and other causes for respiratory symptoms were eliminated and ruled out.

On April 5, 2020, three Curry County residents tested positive for COVID-19.

By April 23, 2020, Curry General had access to rapid coronavirus testing, providing positive test results in 5 minutes, and negative results in 13 minutes.

As of May 14, 2020, the hospital had received US$957,499 federal payout under the CARES Act.

=== Finances ===
"Because of the financial situation that we found ourselves in we have been needing to make very significant and very painful decisions as it would relate to our employees, who we consider family... We have gone into a significant cost-reduction plan and that would include certain positions being eliminated. Other positions we are asking staff to replace them from a full- or part-time position into a per diem status."

— Ginny Williams, CEO
Curry Health Network

In 2012, the hospital reported 2,096 inpatient days, 3,466 emergency department visits, and 46,2096 outpatient visits. It had 24 available beds. Reporting a net profit of US$2.33 million, and a profit margin of 8.7 percent, it had net patient revenue of US$ 26.8 million and charity care charges of US$ 549,212.

Declining revenues due to the state's prohibition on elective surgeries led to 192 staff reductions, affecting services across the hospital, from "nursing, to physical therapy, human resources, labs, radiology and more".

As of 2020, Curry General Hospital has 100 employees and a revenue of US$ 34.85 million.
