= Eastmoreland Hospital =

- Hospital in 2000

Geography
- Location: Portland, Multnomah County, Oregon, United States
- Coordinates: 45°29′02″N 122°38′07″W

Organization
- Type: General

History
- Founded: 1940s
- Closed: 2004

Links
- Lists: Hospitals in Oregon

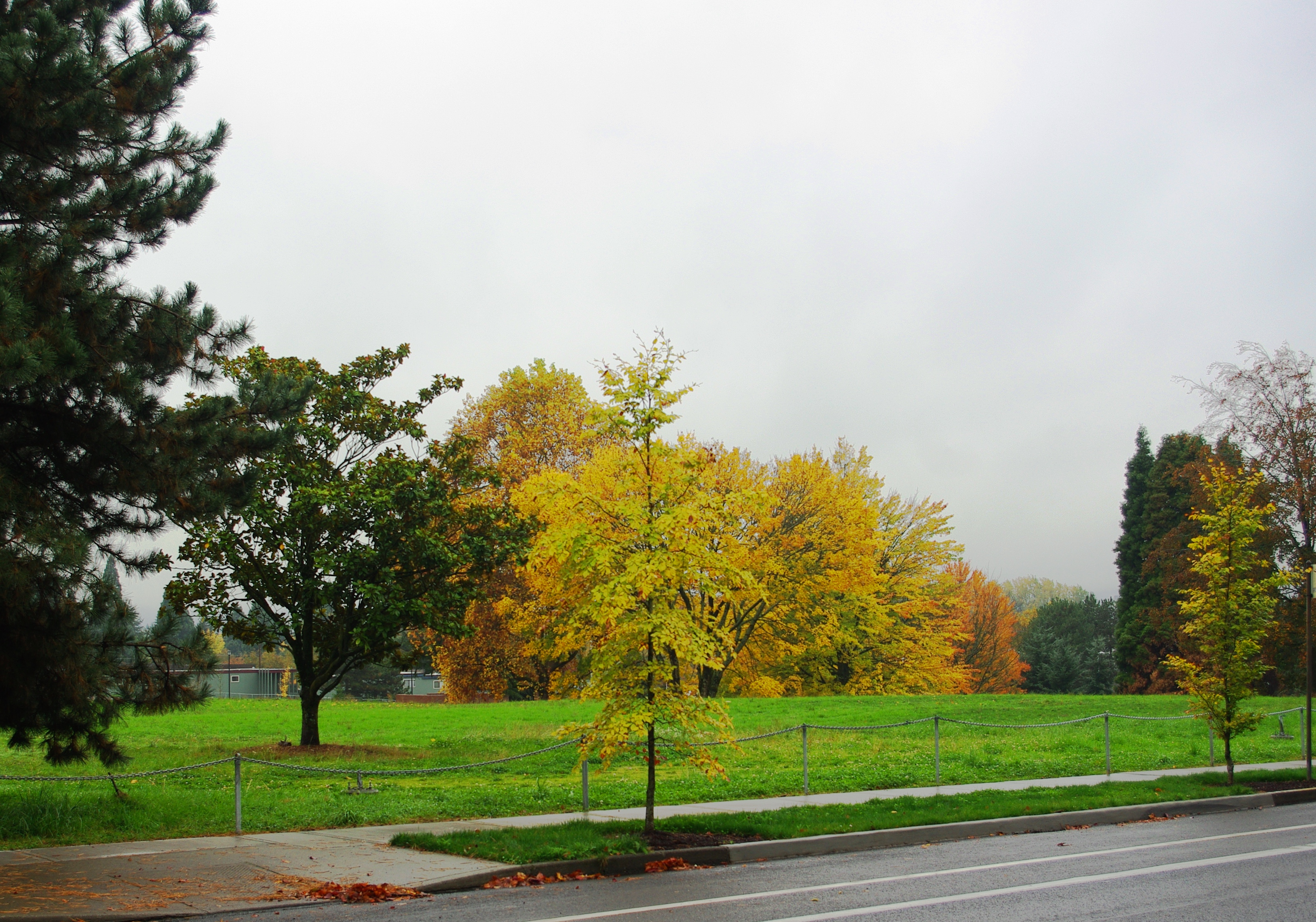
Former grounds in 2009

Eastmoreland Hospital was a 100-bed medical center in Portland, Oregon, United States. Closed in January 2004 along with sister hospital Woodland Park, the facility was purchased by Reed College and torn down.

== History ==
Eastmoreland Hospital was established in the 1940s. In 1987, the hospital opened an osteopathic family practice residency for osteopathic physicians. Located in southeast Portland, the hospital was bought by Symphony Healthcare in 2002. By 2004, Symphony was bankrupt and sold the 7 acres (2.8 ha) of land to Reed College for $5.2 million in February 2004. They also auctioned off everything inside the hospital that year. After acquiring the property, Reed College leveled the buildings.
