= Providence Newberg Medical Center =

- Providence Health & Services
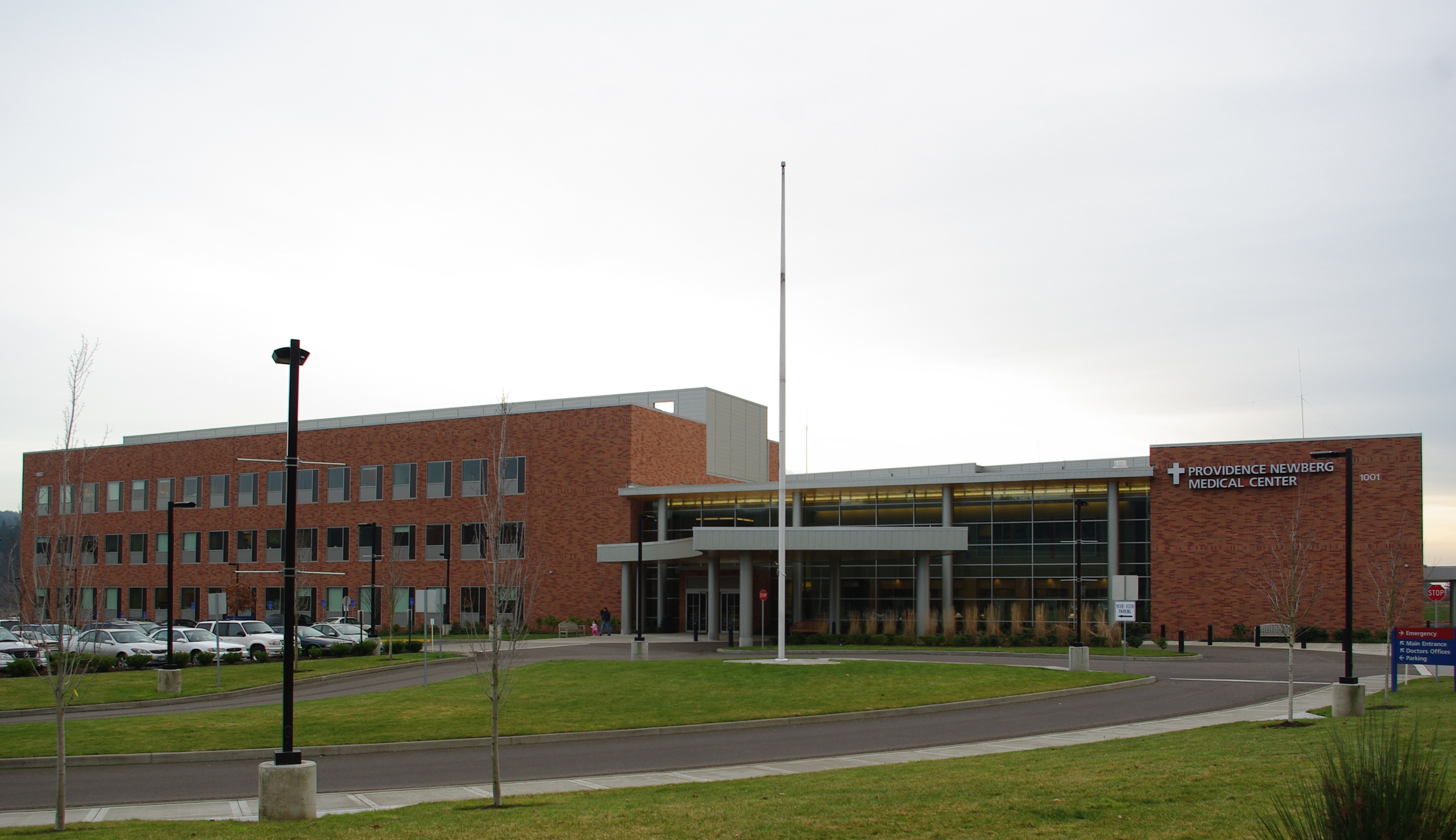
- Main entrance in 2009

Geography
- Location: Newberg, Yamhill County, Oregon, United States
- Coordinates: 45.3082°N 122.9360°W

Organization
- Care system: Medicare/Medicaid/Charity/Public
- Type: General
- Affiliated university: None

Services
- Emergency department: Level IV trauma center
- Beds: 40

History
- Opened: 1957

Links
- Website: http://www.providence.org/yamhill/
- Lists: Hospitals in Oregon

Providence Newberg Medical Center is a non-profit acute care hospital in Newberg, Oregon, United States. Opened at a different location as Newberg Community Hospital, a new 40-licensed-hospital-bed and Leadership in Energy and Environmental Design (LEED)-certified facility was opened in 2006, the first gold certified hospital in the nation. The three building medical center is located on 56 acres (23 ha) on the eastern edge of the city along Oregon Route 99W and is owned by Providence Health & Services.

== History ==
In 1957, the city of Newberg opened Newberg Community Hospital, with three additions built later. The Sisters of Providence Health System (now Providence Health & Services) took over management of the facility in 1986. In 1993, the city owned hospital dealt with issues regarding administrator Mark Meinert who was accused by the city council of ethical violations concerning self-dealing involving his wife. The hospital was overseen by a city commission and still operated by the Sisters of Providence. Later in the year a member of the city council also accused the hospital's administration with other ethics violations concerning travel and the use of public money.

In June 1994, Sisters of Providence purchased the facility from the city. At that time the hospital sat on 8 acres (3.2 ha) on Villa Road and had 35 hospital beds, two operating rooms, and covered a total of 58,900 square feet (5,470 m^{2}). In 2004, the hospital was one of three in Oregon named by Solucient as a top 100 hospital in the United States.

=== New campus ===
Providence decided to replace the aging hospital in the early part of the 2000s. Early plans called for a 39-bed facility at a cost of $58 million to be opened in December 2005. In January 2003, Roger Yost sold his former nursery to Providence. Site preparation for the new hospital began in September 2003.

On September 27, 2004, an official ground breaking ceremony was held at the construction site. Officials gave out commemorative shovels and had a total of 2,453 people assist in the ceremony to set a new Guinness Book World Record. Construction on the buildings started in July 2004, with the buildings completed in May 2006. On June 16, 2006, Providence Newberg Medical Center opened to the public at a total cost of $70.6 million. The hospital was Providence's first new hospital in the state since 1971.

Neighboring George Fox University purchased the old hospital grounds from Providence for $3 million. The new hospital received a Gold LEED certification for the environmentally friendly building. This was the first hospital to achieve the gold certification in the country Long-term plans call for the construction of a second physicians office building at the campus.

== Details ==
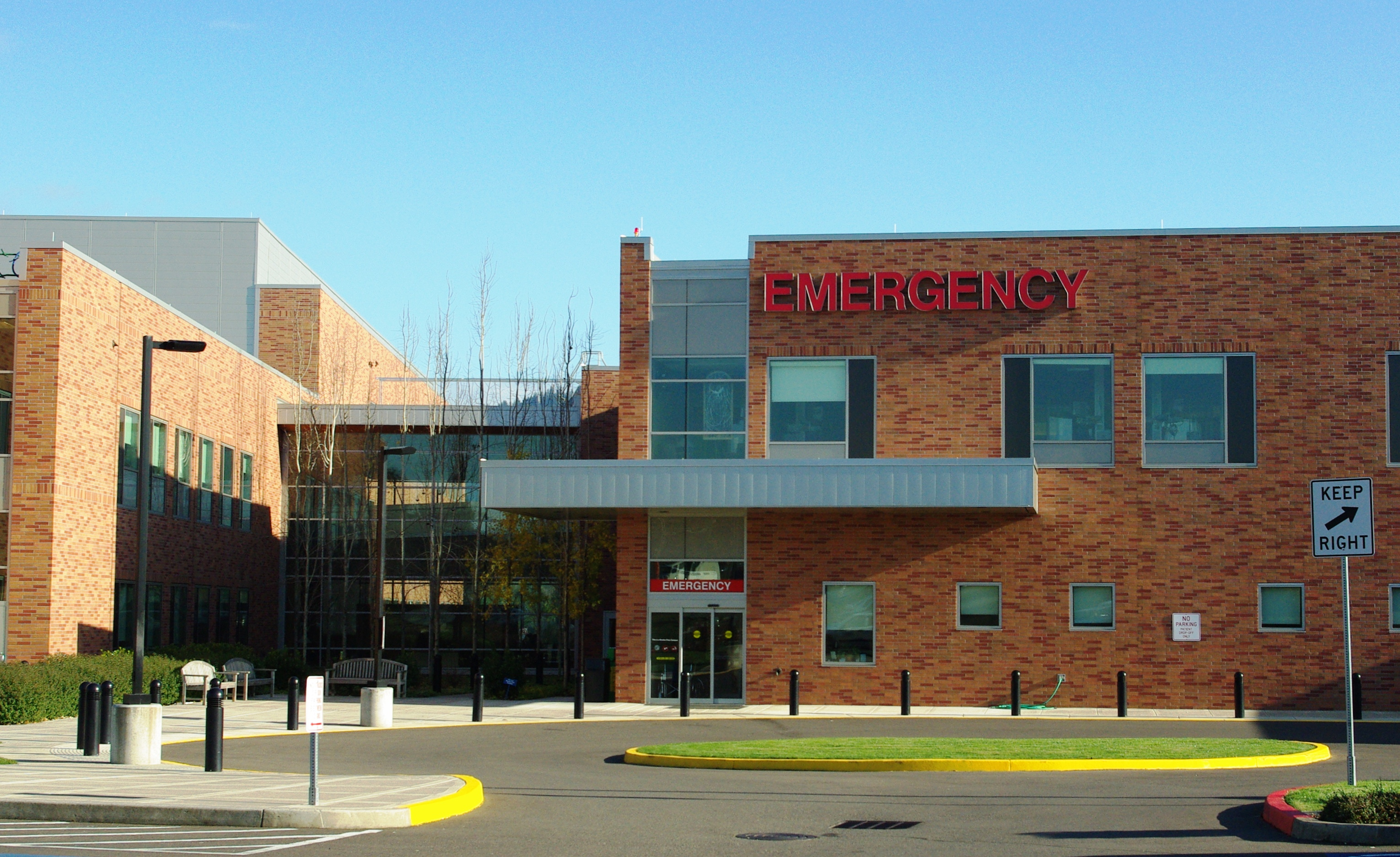
Emergency department entrance

Providence Newberg sits on a 56-acre campus on the eastern edge of Newberg. Built at a cost of $70.6 million, more than $5 million was raised in the community to help pay for the center. The facility offers a variety of medical services including critical care, a 24-hour Level IV emergency room, diagnostic imaging, pediatric, a birth center, operating rooms, three operating rooms, a sleep apnea laboratory, and general medicine among others.

In 2006, the hospital had a net loss of $1.6 million on gross patient revenues of $89 million with $3.8 million in charity care. In 2007, the center staffed 40 hospital beds and had 179,527 visits of which 16,555 were emergency department visits. That year there were 446 surgeries and 573 babies born at the hospital. The medical center is accredited by The Joint Commission and employs 239 full-time and 290 part-time people, with 182 doctors with privileges.

=== Buildings ===
The hospital portion covers 138,000 square feet (12,800 m^{2}), with an office building adding 37,500 square feet (3,480 m^{2}) for a total of 175,500 square feet (16,300 m^{2}) at the medical center. The three-story tall Medical Office Building connects to the hospital through an atrium that includes a café. A two-story Patient & Community Services Building houses non-medical operations including the lobby, gift shop, and administrative offices. The hospital building is also three stories and includes an emergency medicine department with 15 beds, imaging, 27 beds for post-operation recovery, and a birthing center with eight beds. An ICU unit is located on the second floor with four beds, but the floor is designed to allow for expansion to increase that number to eight or allow for more space for birthing.

Mahlum Architects designed the new facility which includes only private patient rooms. Skanska USA served as the general contractor for construction. Environmentally conscious amenities include advanced HVAC systems, natural light in all patient rooms, and windows treated for improved heat transfer resistance. Other items that helped obtain LEED certification were the use of recycled construction material, a system for utilizing storm water, use of environmentally friendly housecleaning products, and purchasing 100% wind generated electricity. Much of the artwork at the hospital was created by area school kids.

== See also ==
- List of hospitals in Oregon
