= Asante Three Rivers Medical Center =

- Asante
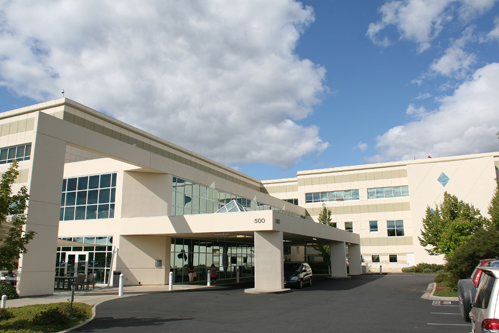
- Asante Three Rivers Medical Center building

Geography
- Location: 500 Southwest Ramsey Avenue, Grants Pass, Oregon, United States
- Coordinates: 42.4215°N 123.343°W

Organization
- Care system: Private, non-profit
- Type: General, acute care

Services
- Beds: 125

History
- Founded: 2001

Links
- Website: www.asante.org
- Lists: Hospitals in Oregon

Asante Three Rivers Medical Center (TRMC; formerly known as Three Rivers Community Hospital, TRCH) is a 125-bed general acute care hospital located in Grants Pass in the U.S. state of Oregon. TRMC was built as a merger between two hospitals, Josephine Memorial (General) Hospital and Southern Oregon Medical Center in 2001.

== History ==
Three Rivers Medical Center opened in June 2001 on a 44-acre (18 ha) campus. Originally a 98-bed hospital, the facility cost $52 million to build and was designed with an open floor plan. It was the first hospital in the state designated "Baby-Friendly".

In 2002, the hospital partnered with Oregon Health & Science University to place young surgeons in rural hospitals. The hospital outsourced management of their Three Rivers Home Care operations to LHC Group in September 2009. Uncompensated care at the community hospital totaled $19.8 million in 2008, $21.3 million in 2009, and $26.4 million in 2010.

In August 2012, Asante Health System broke ground on a new $30 million outpatient center at Three Rivers Medical Center. The new outpatient facility will house imaging, lab services, physical therapy, occupational therapy, speech therapy and urgent care spaces as well as physician offices and a conference center.
