= Rogue Regional Medical Center =

- Asante
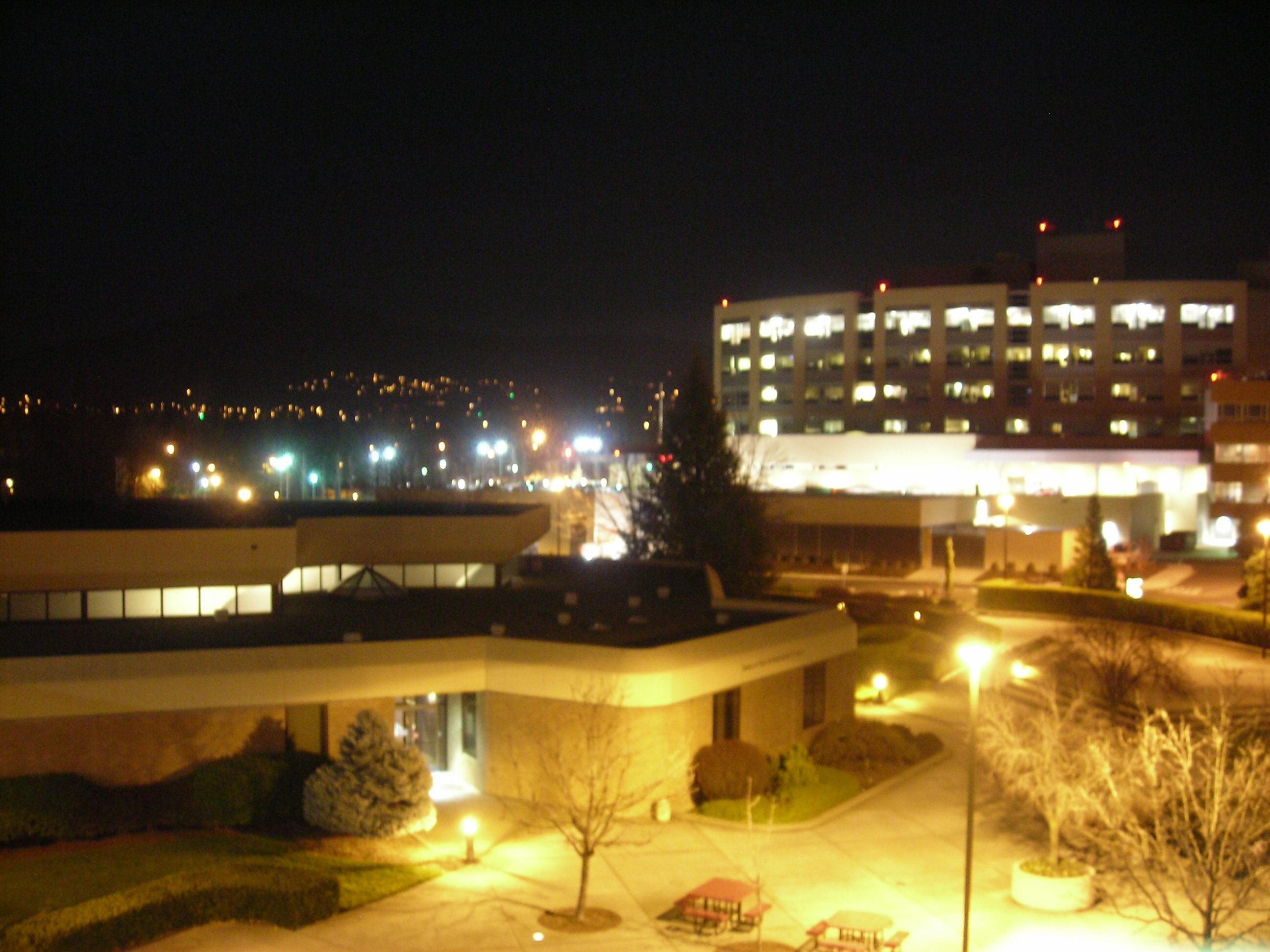
- Rogue Regional Medical Center looking northeast

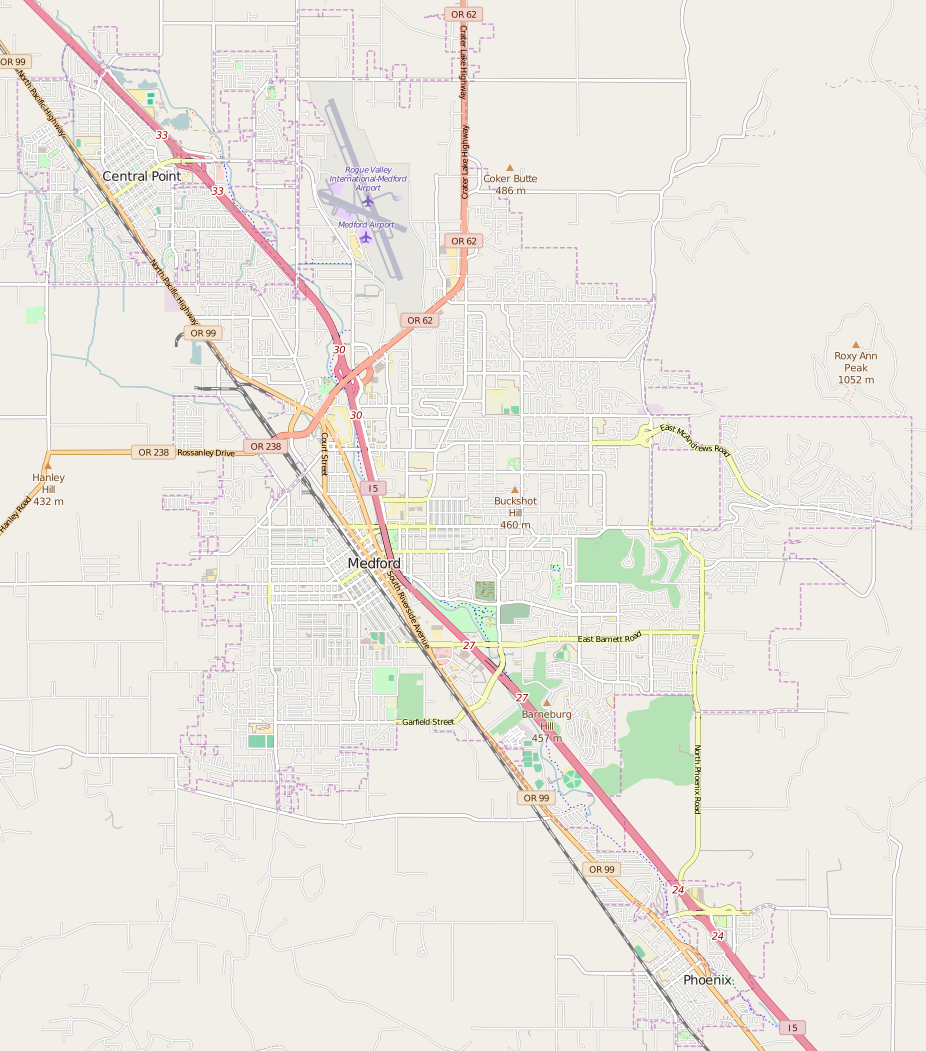
- Location in Medford, Oregon Rogue Regional Medical Center (Oregon)

Geography
- Location: Medford, Oregon, United States
- Coordinates: 42°19′03.95″N 122°49′49.98″W

Services
- Emergency department: Level II trauma center
- Beds: 378

Helipads
- Helipad: FAA LID: OR99

History
- Founded: 1958

Links
- Website: www.asante.org/rrmc/
- Lists: Hospitals in Oregon

The Rogue Regional Medical Center (RRMC; formerly Rogue Valley Memorial Hospital, Rogue Valley Medical Center, RVMC) is a regional medical center run by Asante in Medford, Oregon, United States. It was founded in 1958, and currently has 378 beds. It is one of two hospitals in Medford, the other being Providence Medford Medical Center. The hospital serves nine counties in Southern Oregon, with patients coming from over 200 miles (320 km) away. In 2023, one of the hospital's nurses was accused of switching patients' fentanyl IVs with water in order to divert the supply to herself. This is believed to have contributed to the deaths of several patients.

== History ==
In the 1950s, the Medford community raised $1.9 million for a new hospital. On May 1, 1958, the Rogue Valley Memorial Hospital was built for $2.8 million. It had 80 beds and occupied 73,628 square feet (6,840.3 m^{2}). It was later renamed Rogue Valley Medical Center, and later became Rogue Regional Medical Center.

The East Wing was added in 1960 for $1.7 million, funded by the Hill–Burton Act, bringing the total number of beds to 160. Nearly $200,000 more was granted by the act in 1965 for a new diagnostic and treatment center. A child dental clinic and intensive care, coronary, and cancer units were also added in the 1960s.

In the 1970s, a cardiovascular lab, a linear particle accelerator, an open heart surgery unit, a pediatrics building, and a neonatal intensive care unit (NICU) were added. A child development center opened in the 1980s, along with digital angiography, magnetic resonance imaging (MRI), and alcohol treatment centers.

The new addition on the north side was completed in the 1990s. A library was also built. By 1998, the hospital had grown to 305 beds and 506,000 square feet (47,000 m^{2}).

A major renovation was completed in 2005. It included adding a 210,225-square-foot (19,530.5 m^{2}) four-story parking garage, expanding the emergency department by 67,500 square feet (6,270 m^{2}), the diagnostic center by 32,200 square feet (2,990 m^{2}), and the surgical center by 27,500 square feet (2,550 m^{2}). A 98,000-square-foot (9,100 m^{2}) six-story inpatient bed tower was also added, including 112 new rooms.

In 2013, Asante Rogue Regional Medical Center was ranked as the top hospital in Oregon for Orthopedic Services, with special mention to the joint replacement program by Healthgrades. RRMC was also recognized as the safest hospital in Oregon by Consumer Reports in its 2013 Hospital Rankings.

In August and September 2021, Asante made headlines when hundreds of their employees demonstrated to protest looming layoffs related to Governor Kate Brown's covid-19 vaccine mandate.

=== Fentanyl diversion and hospital response ===
It was first reported in 2023 that a nurse, Dani Marie Schofield, swapped multiple patients' fentanyl IVs with tap water for the purpose of diverting fentanyl to herself. She is facing 44 counts of assault charges. The incident is believed to be tied to a handful of deaths and attorneys representing both living and deceased patients have filed a $303 million lawsuit against the facility. Subsequent reporting on a federal investigation found that hospital staff had raised concerns about possible drug diversion for more than a year before management action was taken, and described wider failures in the hospital's response to both the suspected diversion and an associated outbreak of bloodstream infections. Investigators also found that the hospital had identified an unusual infection cluster months before notifying public health authorities.

=== Neonatology staffing dispute ===
In 2026, Asante terminated the contracts of all nine neonatologists staffing Rogue Regional Medical Center's neonatal intensive care unit and subsequently used temporary locum physicians during the transition to a new staffing model. The former neonatologists said they had raised staffing and patient-safety concerns for approximately two years before their departure and alleged that doing so contributed to the decision. Asante disputed aspects of their account and said the changes were intended to expand neonatal services in the region.
