= PeaceHealth Sacred Heart Medical Center at RiverBend =

Coordinates: 44°4′44″N 123°1′44″W

- PeaceHealth

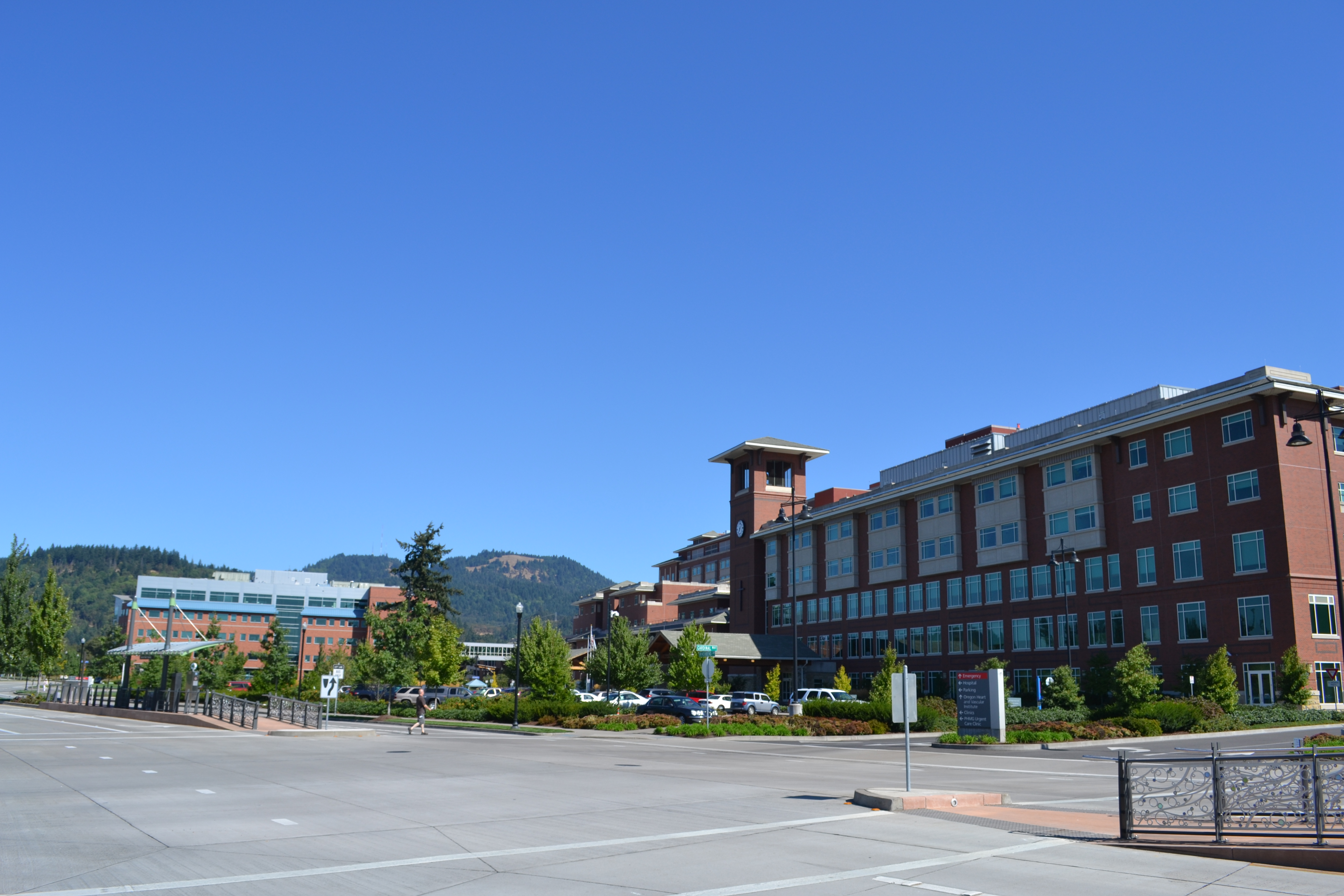
- Hospital in 2011

Geography
- Location: 3333 RiverBend Drive, Springfield, Oregon, United States

Organization
- Care system: Private, non-profit
- Type: General

Services
- Emergency department: Level II Trauma Center
- Beds: 392

History
- Opened: 2008

Links
- Website: PeaceHealth RiverBend
- Lists: Hospitals in Oregon

PeaceHealth Sacred Heart Medical Center at RiverBend is a 388-bed regional medical center. The hospital is located in Springfield, in the U.S. state of Oregon. Established in 2008, it is the only remaining Sacred Heart facility in the Eugene-Springfield area owned by PeaceHealth. The RiverBend facility is home to a 24-hour Level II trauma center including full medical/surgical care. The hospital also provides full women's and children's services, including labor and delivery, and a Neonatal Intensive Care Unit. Oregon Heart and Vascular Institute is located within the facility, as is the Oregon Neurosciences Institute. With the addition of two pediatric surgeons since 2013, RiverBend is now the only hospital outside of the Portland area to offer pediatric surgery.

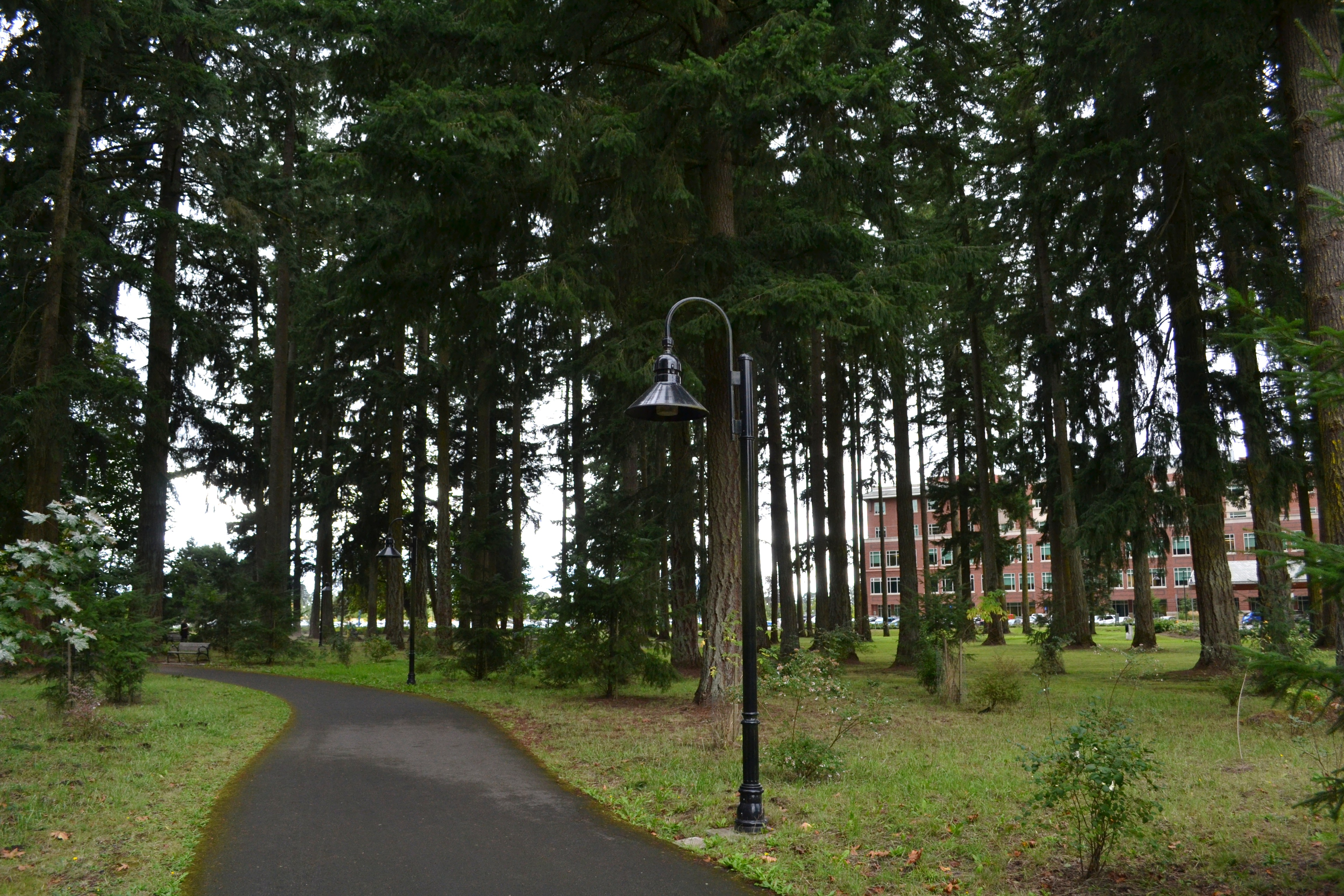
The Lyle Hatfield Trail passes through the Stewart Family Grove behind the hospital

== RiverBend Pavilion ==
RiverBend Pavilion is an onsite location for non-hospital related services. These include:

- Pediatrics
- PeaceHealth Laboratories
- Oregon Imaging Center
- Gastroenterology
- Endoscopy
- Neurology
- Oregon Bariatric Center

Opened in August 2008, the facility replaced Sacred Heart University District as the largest in the area. The University District location stayed open until 2023, when its emergency department and inpatient rooms closed, allegedly due to rising operating costs.

== See also ==
- List of hospitals in Oregon
- Sacred Heart Medical Center University District, the former second location in the area.
