= Bess Kaiser Hospital =

- Kaiser Permanente
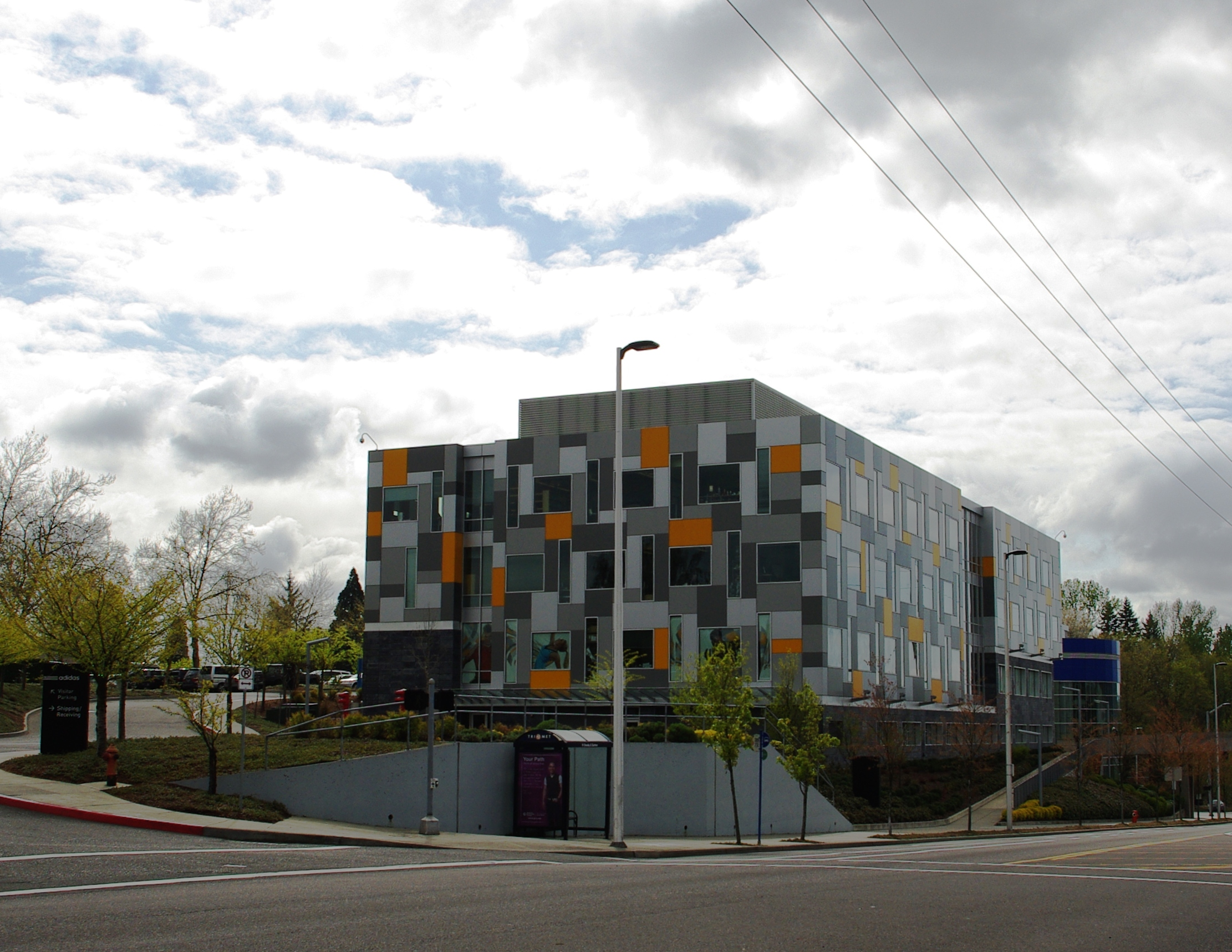
- Former Bess Kaiser, now Adidas

Geography
- Location: Portland, Multnomah County, Oregon, United States
- Coordinates: 45.5595°N 122.6950°W

Organization
- Type: General

History
- Opened: 1959
- Closed: 1998

Links
- Lists: Hospitals in Oregon

Bess Kaiser Hospital was a hospital in Portland, Oregon, United States, which closed in 1998.

The hospital opened in 1959 and was the first postwar Portland-area hospital in Henry J. Kaiser's Permanente Foundation health care network. It was named after Henry J. Kaiser's wife Bess. The former location is now occupied by adidas America Headquarters.
