= Triad Hospitals =

Former Texas, USA hospital operator

- Industry: Hospital operation
- Defunct: July 2007
- Fate: merged
- Successor: Community Health Systems
- Headquarters: Plano, Texas

Triad Hospitals was a hospital operator based in Plano, Texas. Spun off from Hospital Corporation of America in 1999, it acquired Quorum Health Group in 2000 to become the third-largest investor-owned hospital group. It was merged into Community Health Systems in 2007.

In February 2007 it received a buyout offer from Goldman Sachs Alternatives and CCMP Capital. It received a superior merger/buyout offer in March 2007 from Community Health Systems of $54/share. The buyout was completed in July 2007.

== See also ==
- Beacon Hospital
- List of Texas companies (T)
