= Legacy Good Samaritan Medical Center =

- Legacy Health System
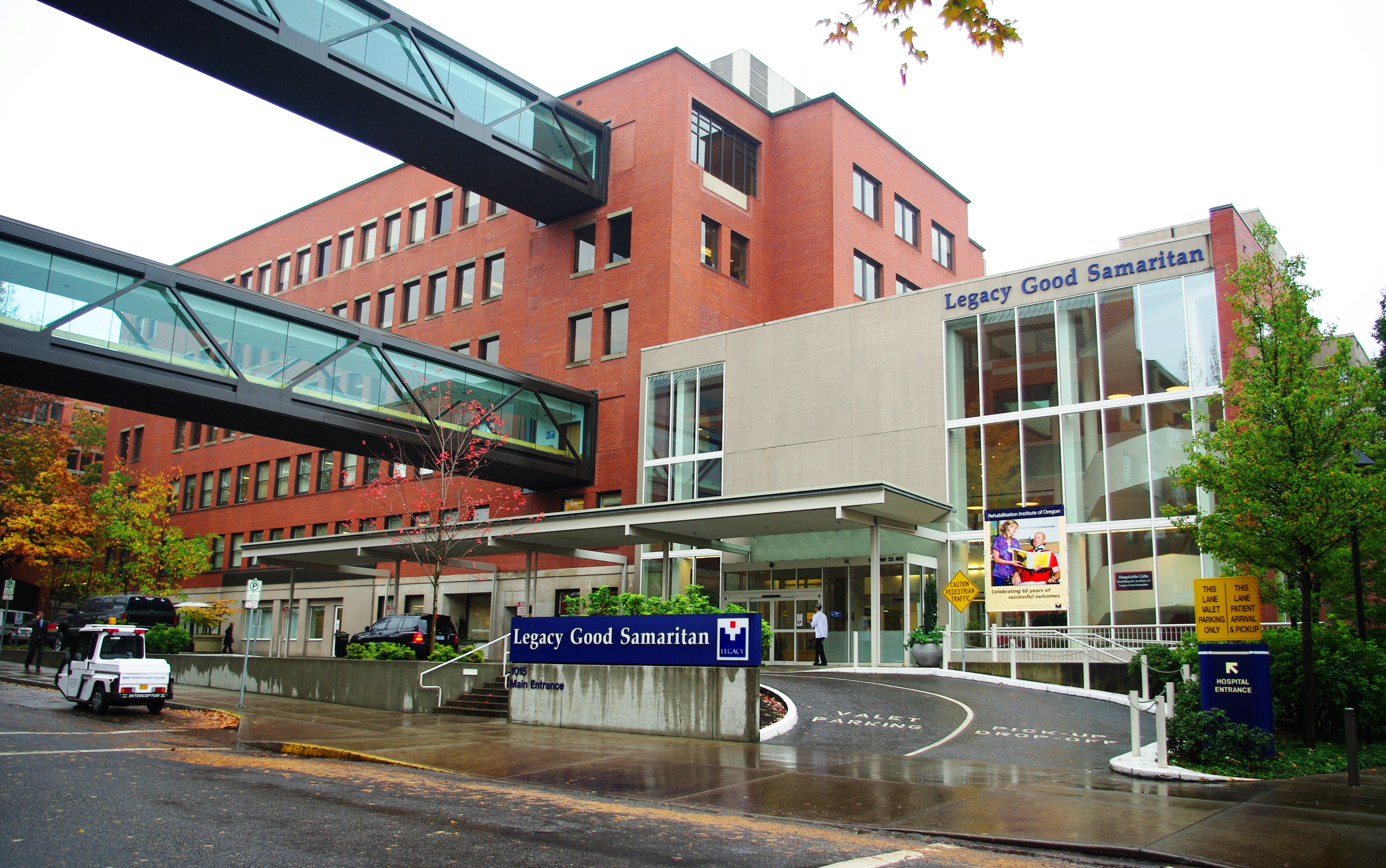

- Location within Portland, Oregon

Geography
- Location: 1015 NW 22nd Ave, Portland, Oregon, United States
- Coordinates: 45°31′49″N 122°41′47″W

Organization
- Care system: Private, non-profit
- Type: General medical and surgical

Services
- Emergency department: yes
- Beds: 539

History
- Founded: 1875

Links
- Website: Legacy Good Samaritan Medical Center
- Lists: Hospitals in Oregon

Legacy Good Samaritan Medical Center, commonly known informally as Good Samaritan Hospital or Good Sam, is a 539-bed teaching hospital located in northwest Portland, Oregon, United States. Founded in 1875 by the Episcopal Diocese of Oregon, it is a part of the Legacy Health. It has centers for breast health, cancer, and stroke, and is home to the Legacy Devers Eye Institute, the Legacy Obesity and Diabetes Institute, the Legacy Cancer Institute, the Legacy Rehabilitation Institute of Oregon, and the Linfield-Good Samaritan School of Nursing.

== History ==
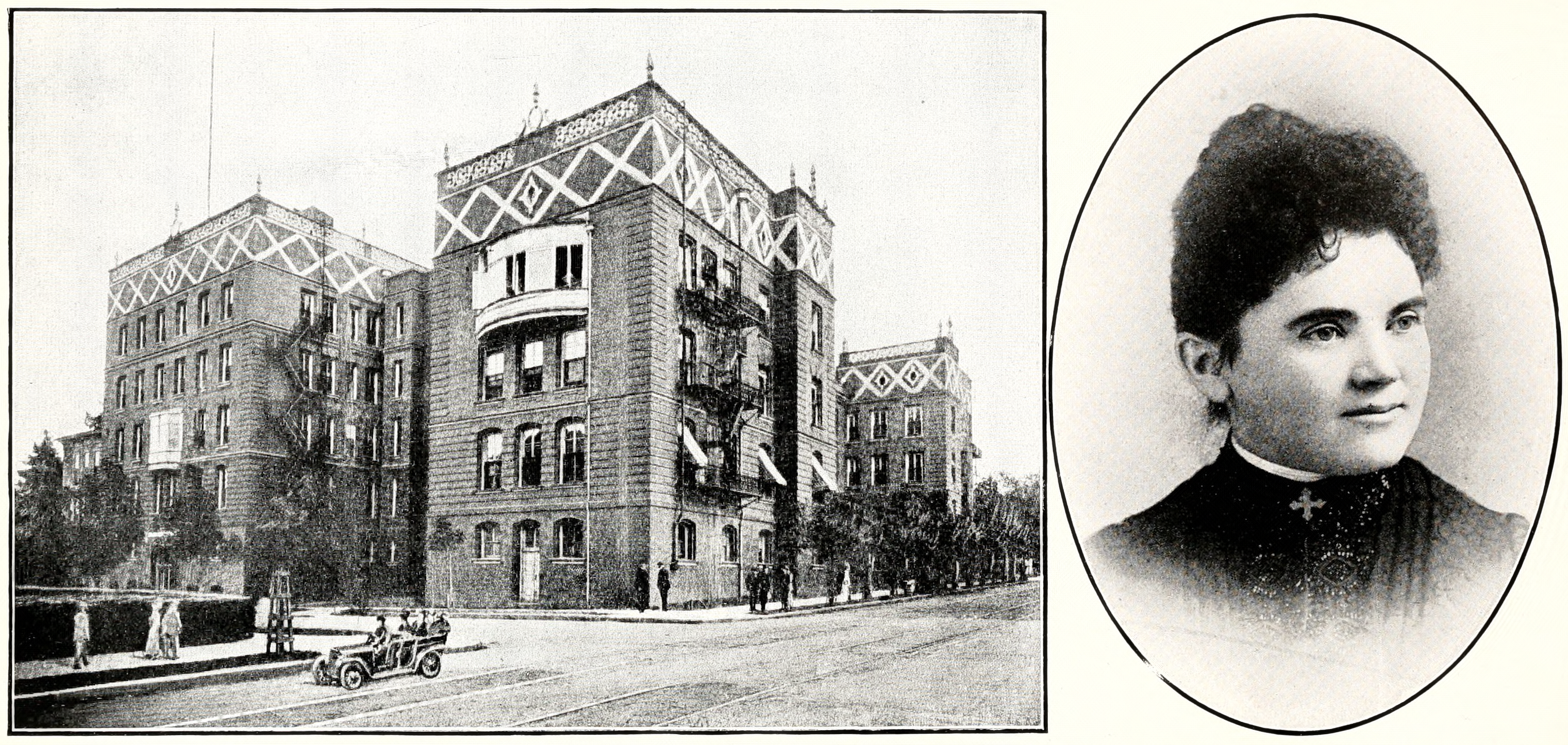
An early building of Good Samaritan Hospital

Good Samaritan Hospital was established in October 1875, becoming the second hospital in both the city and state after St. Vincent's had opened in July of that year. The hospital was founded by Rev. Benjamin Wistar Morris and was originally located at northwest 21st and L streets. Initially, the three-story hospital had 25 beds and was built for $10,000. In 1889, the hospital expanded to be able to handle 75 patients. Another expansion, the addition of the C. H. Lewis wing on the south side of the original structure, began in 1900 with Rev. Morris speaking at the laying of the cornerstone in May of that year. The Wilcox Women's Hospital opened in 1922 as the first women's hospital in the state, which became part of Good Sam in 1979. Emily L. Loveridge founded the hospital's nursing school in 1890; it was the first nursing school in the Northwestern United States.

Good Sam merged with HealthLink (which included Emanuel Hospital and Meridian Park Hospital) in 1989 to form Legacy Health. In both 2011 and 2013, the hospital was ranked by U.S. News & World Report as the second best hospital in Oregon behind OHSU Hospital.

== Operations ==
Good Sam is licensed for 539 beds, but only staffs 247 of the beds. The hospital is accredited by the Joint Commission on Accreditation of Health Care Organizations (JCAHO) and the Commission on Accreditation of Rehabilitation Facilities (CARF).

Services at the facility include emergency services, oncology, cardiac rehabilitation and other heart services, maternity, radiology, an intensive care unit, orthopedics, pharmacy, eye health, surgery, sleep disorders, transplants, and women's health, among others. For 2012, the hospital had a total of 11,275 discharges, with 52,005 patient days, 3,433 surgeries, 1,028 births, and 23,763 emergency department visits. That year it had $653 million in charges, provided $32.8 million in charity care, and had an operating margin of $26.5 million.

== See also ==
- List of hospitals in Oregon
