= Bill Schonely =

American sports announcer (1929–2023)

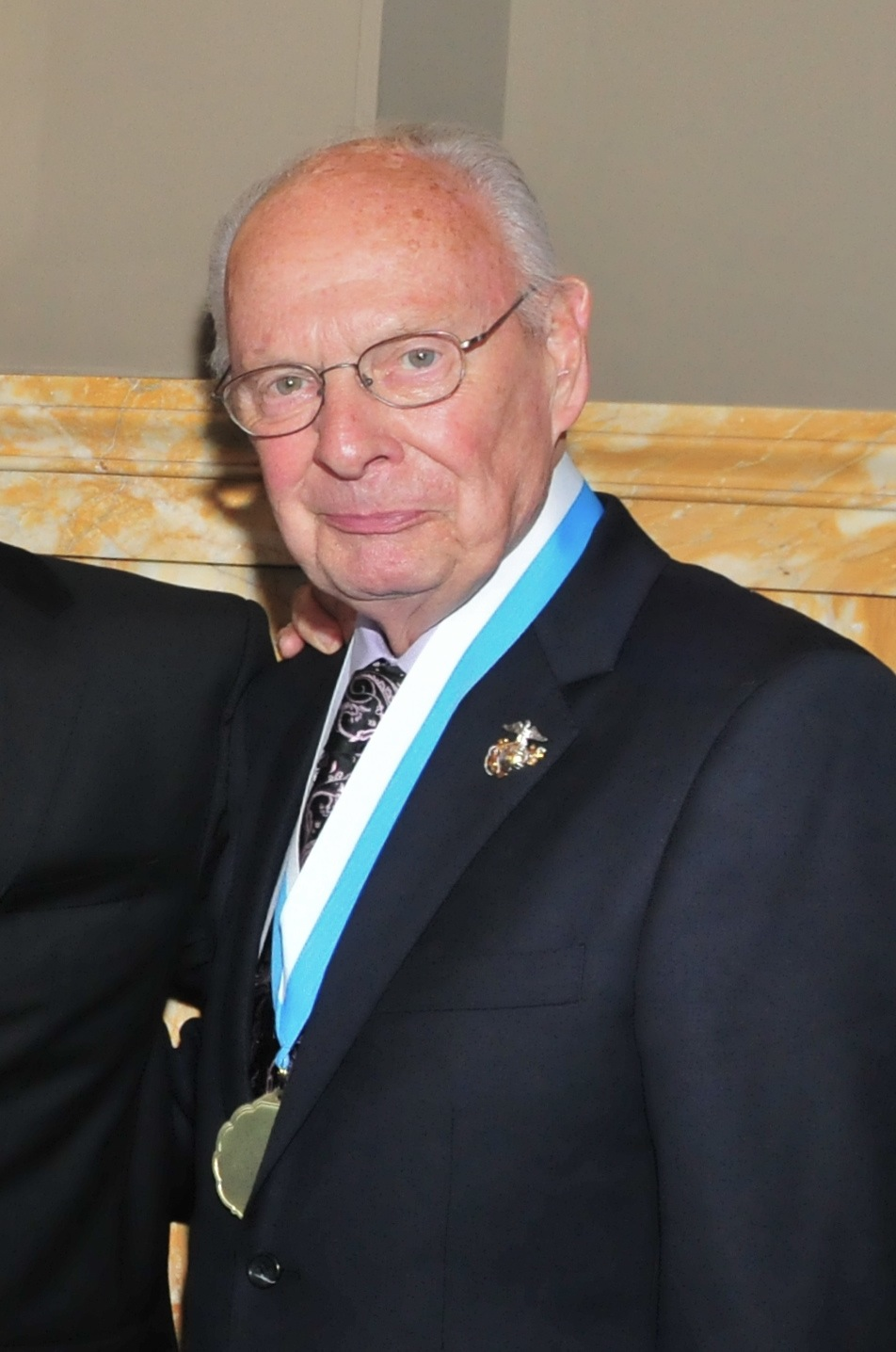
- Schonely in 2013
- Born: June 1, 1929; Norristown, Pennsylvania, U.S.
- Died: January 21, 2023 (aged 93); Portland, Oregon, U.S.
- Other names: The Schonz, Mr. Rip City
- Spouses: Barbara (before 1967); Dottie (m. 1992)
- Children: 4
- Sports commentary career
- Teams: Seattle Totems (1957–1967); Seattle Pilots (1969); Portland Trail Blazers (1970–1998); Portland Beavers (2001–2002)
- Genre: Play-by-play
- Sports: Basketball; hockey; baseball; roller derby

William W. Schonely (June 1, 1929 – January 21, 2023), nicknamed "The Schonz", was an American sports broadcaster who was the play-by-play announcer for the Portland Trail Blazers for almost three decades, from the team's launch in 1970 until 1998. A native of Pennsylvania, he worked in radio in Louisiana and Seattle before settling in Portland, Oregon. In addition to his work for the Blazers, he was a sportscaster for Major League Baseball games, several minor league baseball teams, college sports, National Hockey League games, and junior ice hockey.

== Background and military career ==
Schonely was born in Norristown, Pennsylvania, the second and first surviving child of Walter and Juanita Schonely (née Hoch). A stutterer as a child, Schonely worked on a weekly high school informational radio show on WNAR in Norristown, which led to opportunities at radio and television stations in Philadelphia. Upon graduation, he enlisted in the United States Marine Corps and was sent to Guam. While stationed overseas, Schonely transferred to Armed Forces Radio, where he was a disc jockey as well as doing news, sports and interviews. He also did his first play-by-play, calling military football and baseball games. In 1951, Schonely was reassigned to Quantico, Virginia, where he worked on the weekly base newspaper and emceed military events and parades under the guidance of General Clifton B. Cates. Among his duties were escorting military celebrities to New York City, Washington, D.C., and Philadelphia for radio and TV interviews.

== Early career ==
=== Baton Rouge ===
Upon leaving the Marines, Schonely followed a job offer to WAFB radio and TV in Baton Rouge, Louisiana, where he served in a variety of on-air roles. He covered sports for the radio station, covering the minor league baseball team Baton Rouge Red Sticks and the LSU Tigers football and basketball teams as well as some rodeo events. WAFB promoted a weekly wrestling match, and Schonely became the ring announcer. Schonely filled in as a referee, which eventually led to participating in matches on a tag team.

=== Seattle ===
Schonely moved to Seattle in 1956 and joined KOMO radio and then moved over to KOMO-TV, where he worked with future ABC Sports broadcaster Keith Jackson. Once again, Schonely found work in professional wrestling, although he did not pursue it as a career. Schonely also called roller derby games for KTNT-TV.

In 1957, Schonely suggested to Keith Allen, then player-coach for the Seattle Totems of the Western Hockey League, that their games be televised and that he should call them. A skeptical Allen agreed, if Schonely could find sponsors. Schonely enlisted friends including a funeral home director, optometrist and restaurateur to sponsor, and KOMO-TV broadcast Totems games on Sunday nights. Schonely called Totems games for 11 years on television and radio, and the team became popular in Seattle for a time.

In one incident during a game against the San Francisco Seals at the Cow Palace, an obnoxious fan would hit a siren every time the Seals made a good play, and eventually held the siren up to Schonely's ear. Going to a commercial, Schonely announced: "By the time I get back on the air, this guy is going to have a knuckle sandwich." Schonely put his headset down, turned around and slugged him. Security took the man away, and Schonely returned to the air, saying: "He got his knuckle sandwich, folks."

Schonely moved to KAYO radio in 1959, and the Totems came with him. However, the station switched to a country and western format, and Schonely left the station. Schonely worked as public relations director for Longacres Race Track before returning to broadcasting as sports director for KVI. Schonely brought the Totems to the station, called games for the Washington Huskies and baseball games for the Pacific Coast League Seattle Angels. At that time, the PCL stretched from Hawaii to Little Rock, and the station could not cover all games. Instead, Schonely would receive updates from a reporter at the game via teletype, play sound effects to simulate crowd noise, and call the game as if he were actually present. In 1967, Schonely did West Coast National Hockey League coverage for CBS. Schonely also called major league Seattle Pilots games for the one year they played before moving to Milwaukee.

In 1967, Schonely nearly became the radio voice for the Seattle SuperSonics, newly created by NBA expansion. Dick Vertlieb, the team's first general manager, offered the job to Schonely, who was not an avid NBA fan then. Schonely accepted, but was pushed aside at the behest of Union Oil of California, a key sponsor who wanted Bob Blackburn, who was the Sonics' radio voice until the early 1990s.

== Portland Trail Blazers ==
=== Early years ===
In April 1970, Schonely was approached by Blazers co-founder Harry Glickman, whom Schonely knew as a founder of the Portland Buckaroos. Schonely was the organization's sixth hire. Said Glickman in a 2008 interview: "The interview only lasted a few minutes; he opened his mouth and I knew I had the right guy."

Schonely moved to Portland to start with the team on July 1, 1970. Schonely's first task was to assemble a radio network, starting with Portland's KOIN as the flagship, and Blazer games were carried on six stations during the first year. Schonely was not as familiar with basketball as with other sports, and had to work hard to learn the game, attending every practice early on.

Schonely called the play-by-play on 2,522 Blazers radio and television broadcasts, from Portland's very first preseason outing (September 24, 1970) to the team's appearance in the 1998 NBA Playoffs (April 30, 1998).

Schonely's announcing streak was interrupted only once, when he missed the first 25 games of the 1982–83 season for heart bypass surgery following a heart attack.

In 2003, Schonely returned to the team to appear in radio and television segments and act as a team ambassador at charity and community events.

=== Return to the Blazers ===
In 2003, Schonely was rehired by the Trail Blazers' new management, a move aimed at reconnecting with Blazers fans disenchanted by the previous management and players' off-court troubles. Schonely's role included hosting pre-game segments, "Memorable Moments" on television and "Blazers Flashback" on radio, plus appearances in advertisements and at community events. Team president Steve Patterson called the move "smart business" and intended to honor the team's past.

The move followed general manager Bob Whitsitt's resignation in May. Asked whether he would have responded had the call come from Whitsitt, Schonely said at the time, "Probably not."

On October 14, 2009, at age 80, Schonely returned to the microphone for the second half of a "throwback" exhibition game held at Portland's Memorial Coliseum, where the Blazers played from 1970 until 1995. The occasion was billed as a one-quarter tribute, but radio announcer Brian Wheeler let Schonely call the remainder of the game.

Schonely's Trail Blazers business card read, "Ambassador".

== Portland Beavers ==
In 2000, Schonely signed a five-year deal to be the play-by-play announcer with the newest incarnation of the Portland Beavers Triple-A franchise, relocated from Albuquerque, New Mexico. Like the original Blazers job, the Beavers offer came from Harry Glickman, this time on behalf of then-Beavers owner Portland Family Entertainment, run by Glickman's son. Schonely, who allowed that he was open to a future role with the Blazers, called games for the Beavers through the 2002 PCL season.

While announcing Beavers games, Schonely made use of his famous phrases. Adapted for baseball use, "Lickety brindle up the middle" meant a base hit going past the pitcher's mound into center field, "Bingo, bango, bongo" was used on 5–4–3 double plays. More occasionally, Schonely deployed "Rip City" for an outstanding and important play.

== Other work ==
Schonely has recorded television advertisements for Standard TV & Appliance and other businesses in the Portland area and has served as emcee of the former Fred Meyer Challenge charity golf tournament.

== Popularity ==
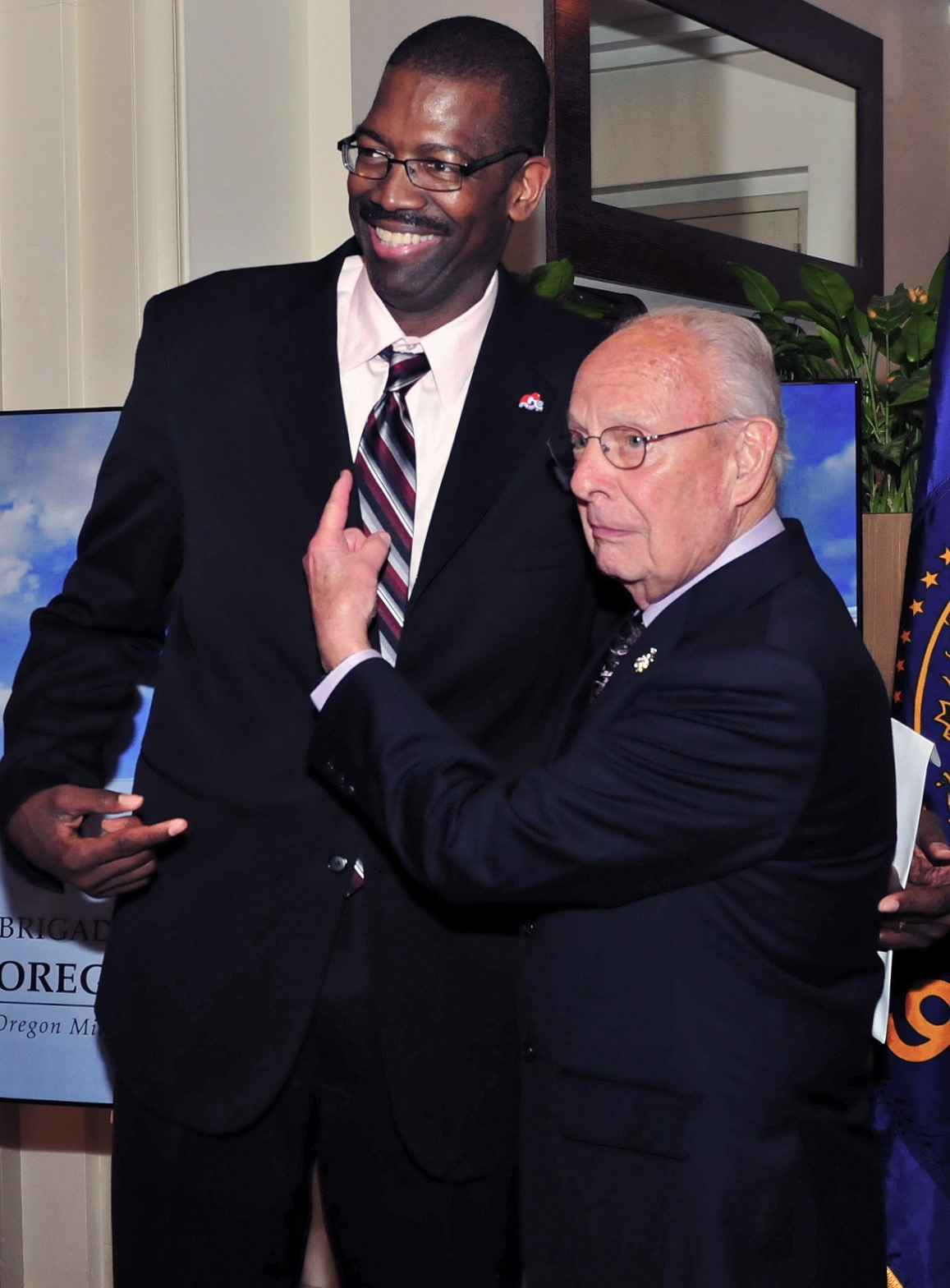
Schonely with former Trail Blazer Mike Harper at a 2013 benefit event

According to Oregon sportswriter Kerry Eggers, fans consider Schonely "the one constant link with Oregon's only major-league team."

NBA trainer Ron Culp said of Schonely in 1990, "Bill Schonely is the symbol of the love affair the fans have with the Trail Blazers. ... He's part of their immediate family. Everything else with the Blazers have changed over the past 20 years, but you just don't mess with the Schonz."

Schonely is often compared to legendary announcers Chick Hearn and Johnny Most, of the Los Angeles Lakers and Boston Celtics, respectively. At Schonely's induction to the 2002 Oregon Sports Hall of Fame, former Blazers center Bill Walton said: "Bill Schonely is as important to sports in the Northwest as Chick Hearn was to sports in Southern California. There are very few people in the history of Western Civilization who have had that kind of an impact." Walton also said: "Bill Schonely is the most important figure in the history of Oregon sports, with all due respect to Phil Knight and Maurice Lucas. Bill Schonely is the man who convinced people that sports are worthwhile."

A restaurant in the Rose Garden is named in his honor, the Pyramid Taproom at Schonely's Place.

The Trail Blazers organization retired Schonely's microphone on November 3, 2003.

The 1992 Public Enemy album Greatest Misses features the voice of Schonely calling Trail Blazer games, on the track "Air Hoodlum."

=== Signature phrases ===
Schonely coined or popularized numerous phrases and sayings during his radio career with the Blazers, which have become synonymous with the Blazermania phenomenon in Oregon, including "Rip City", "Bingo Bango Bongo", "Climb the golden ladder", "Lickety brindle up the middle" and "You've got to make your free throws."

Schonely's best-known phrase, "Rip City", debuted in a game against the Lakers in 1971. The Blazers had fallen behind by a significant margin, yet rallied back to a two-point deficit. When a long jump shot by guard Jim Barnett tied the game, Schonely blurted out, "Rip City! All right!" an exhortation for which Schonely had no literal explanation. The Blazers lost 136–114 but the phrase stuck, became synonymous with Blazers basketball and even became a nickname for Portland itself.

Schonely is also known for the opening line of each broadcast, "Good evening basketball fans, wherever you may be..." delivered in some variation since the beginning of his professional sportscasting career in Baton Rouge.

=== Recognition ===
In 1999, Schonely was inducted into the Oregon Sports Hall of Fame for Broadcasting.

In 2012, Schonely was awarded the Curt Gowdy Media Award from the Basketball Hall of Fame.

=== Personal life and death ===
Schonely and his first wife Barbara had four children; they divorced in 1967. Their son Steven died of cancer in 2012. Schonely and his second wife, Dorothy "Dottie" Kehr, were childhood sweethearts, reconnecting at their 50th high school reunion years after his divorce and her husband's death; they married on March 16, 1991. His philanthropic work included association with the American Heart Association, Life Flight, Cystic Fibrosis Foundation and Providence Child Center Foundation. He sang in his church choir, played golf and liked to listen to big-band music.

Schonely died in Portland on January 21, 2023, at the age of 93.
