= Legacy Meridian Park Medical Center =

- Legacy Health System
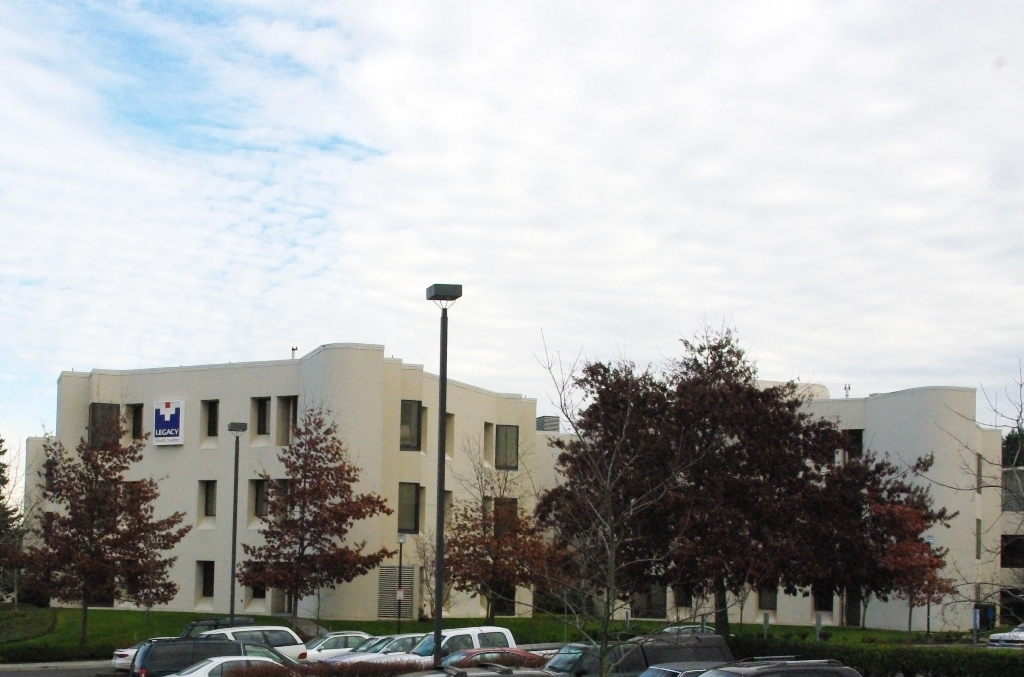

Geography
- Location: Tualatin, Oregon, United States
- Coordinates: 45.378537°N 122.74397°W

Organization
- Care system: Private, non-profit
- Type: Acute care

Services
- Emergency department: Yes
- Beds: 150 licensed 128 staffed

Helipads
- Helipad: FAA LID: 6OR5

History
- Founded: 1973

Links
- Website: http://www.legacyhealth.org/body.cfm?id=80
- Lists: Hospitals in Oregon

Legacy Meridian Park Medical Center, formerly Legacy Meridian Park Hospital, is an acute care hospital in Tualatin, Oregon, United States. Opened in 1973, it is operated by Legacy Health. The facility is licensed for 150 beds, but operates only 128. Located in Clackamas County along the boundary with Washington County, it employs over 800 people and is Tualatin's second largest employer.

== History ==
Originally named Southwest Hospital while under proposal beginning in 1968, it was renamed as Meridian Park when it opened after the Willamette Meridian, which bisects the hospital grounds. The medical facility was a joint venture between Emanuel Hospital (now Legacy Emanuel) and Physicians and Surgeons Hospital (now defunct), which formed Metropolitan Hospitals. Groundbreaking occurred in 1971 and the hospital opened in 1973 when the city of Tualatin had a population of 750 at the 1970 Census and prior to the construction of now neighboring Interstate 205. The facility was built on 48 acres (190,000 m^{2}) in a rural area at the edge of the Portland metropolitan area and employed 109 people when it opened.

In 1989, Emanuel Hospital, Good Samaritan Hospital, and Mount Hood Medical Center merged to create Legacy Health System, with Meridian Park becoming Legacy Meridian Park Hospital. A community health center was added in 1990 at a cost of $1 million. In May 1992, a $14 million expansion began that included a new maternity ward. In 1998, Meridian Park began a $21 million expansion. The construction added 50,000 square feet (4,600 m^{2}) of space and 32 hospital beds.

By 2002, the hospital was the ninth busiest in Oregon and served the cities of Tualatin, Tigard, Sherwood, Wilsonville, King City, and Lake Oswego among others. At that time it employed almost 800 people and was the largest employer in the city of Tualatin. A lab technician was arrested in 2003 on accusations of fondling patients. In 2005, the emergency department was expanded with a separate area for children created. The hospital purchased 20 acres (8.1 ha) of adjacent land in 2006 for $7 million to allow for future expansion of the campus. Zoned for residential use that would also allow for hospital usage, the hospital requested a change in zoning in 2009 to ensure they could expand onto the site at a later date.

== Services ==
Meridian Park Hospital Heliport
- IATA: none; ICAO: none; FAA LID: 6OR5

Summary
- Elevation AMSL: 215 ft (66 m)
- Coordinates: 45°22′40.43″N 122°44′25.34″W
- Interactive map of Meridian Park Hospital Heliport

Helipads
Number	Length		Surface
Number	ft	m	Surface
H1	50	15	Concrete

Facilities at Legacy Meridian Park include a heart catheterization lab, breast health center, comprehensive stroke program, a 24-hour emergency room, cancer center, radiology services, a laboratory for sleep disorders, and an interventional cardiology department.

Licensed for 150 hospital beds, Meridian Park had 138,331 total visits in 2007 with 28,018 patient days. The emergency department has 25 beds and served 31,548 people in 2007. As of 2009, it was the city's largest employer, with approximately 800 employees. There were 1,061 births at the hospital in 2007.

The Meridian Park Hospital Heliport (FAA LID: 6OR5) is located on the grounds of the medical center.

== See also ==
- List of hospitals in Oregon
