= Legacy Emanuel Medical Center =

- Legacy Health
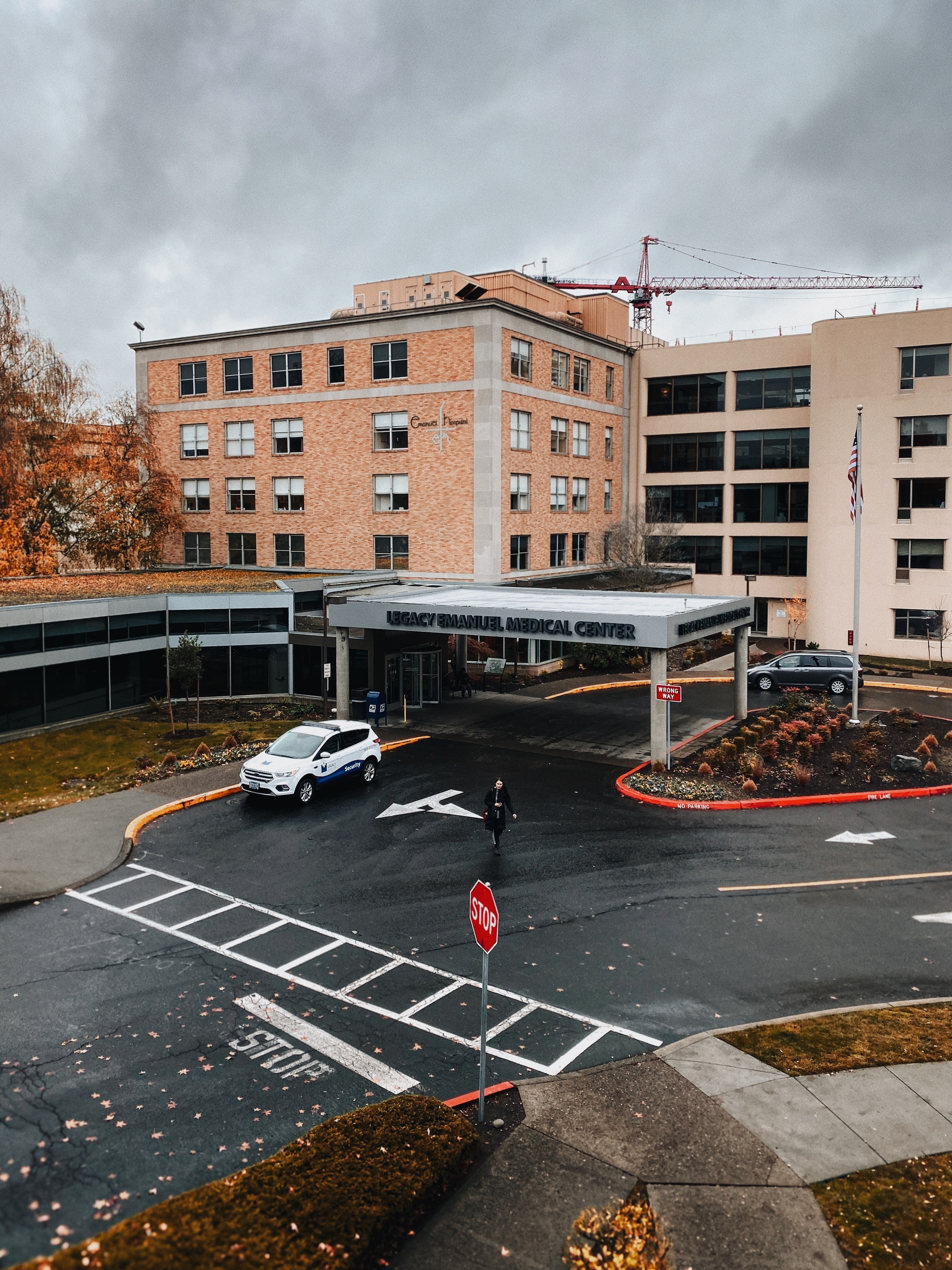
- Main hospital building in 2019; Life Flight helipad is visible on top of building

- Location within Portland, Oregon Location within Oregon

Geography
- Location: 2801 North Gantenbein Avenue, Portland, Oregon, United States
- Coordinates: 45.543344°N 122.671001°W

Organization
- Care system: Private, non-profit
- Type: District General

Services
- Emergency department: Level I
- Beds: 554

History
- Founded: January 2, 1912

Links
- Website: Legacy Emanuel Medical Center
- Lists: Hospitals in Oregon

Legacy Emanuel Medical Center is a hospital located in the Eliot neighborhood of Portland, Oregon, United States. Founded in 1912, it is one of only two Level I trauma centers in the state of Oregon, (Note: Legacy Emanuel is one of two Level I trauma centers in Oregon; Oregon Health & Science University Hospital, the state's other Level I trauma center, is also located in Portland, on the western side of the Willamette river.) and home to the only burn center between Seattle and Sacramento. The hospital is also home to the Life Flight Network (MEDEVAC), the first of its kind instituted on the U.S. West Coast. The 554-bed facility provides a full range of services, including conventional surgery, heart treatment, critical care, neurology/stroke care/brain surgery, and care for high-risk pregnancies. Legacy Emanuel also houses the Randall Children's Hospital. It is one of the hospitals in the area where gun shot victims are routinely brought in.

Originally opened as Emanuel Hospital by the First Immanuel Lutheran Church of Portland, the facility's original location was a historic Victorian home in North Portland (at the site of the hospital's present-day location). A nursing school was established in 1913, after which a new building was constructed in 1915 to accommodate the increasing influx of patients.

The hospital saw multiple renovations and developments over the following several decades. In the 1970s, Emanuel Hospital began a controversial expansion project which displaced a significant number of homes and businesses in the Albina neighborhood adjacent to the hospital grounds. In 1983, the hospital was operated by HealthLink, but in 1989, merged with Good Samaritan Hospital to form the Legacy Health System, after which it became known as Legacy Emanuel Medical Center.

== History ==
=== Establishment and early years ===
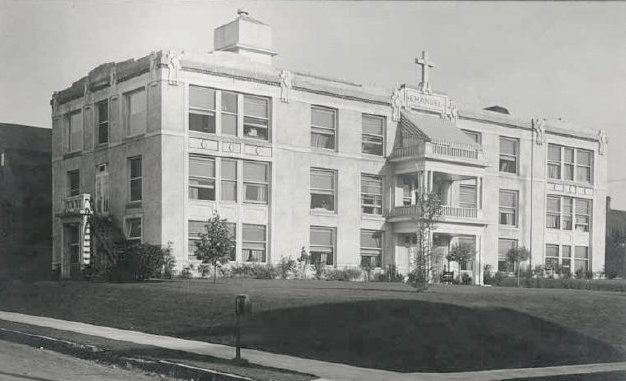
Hospital building, c. 1910s–1920s

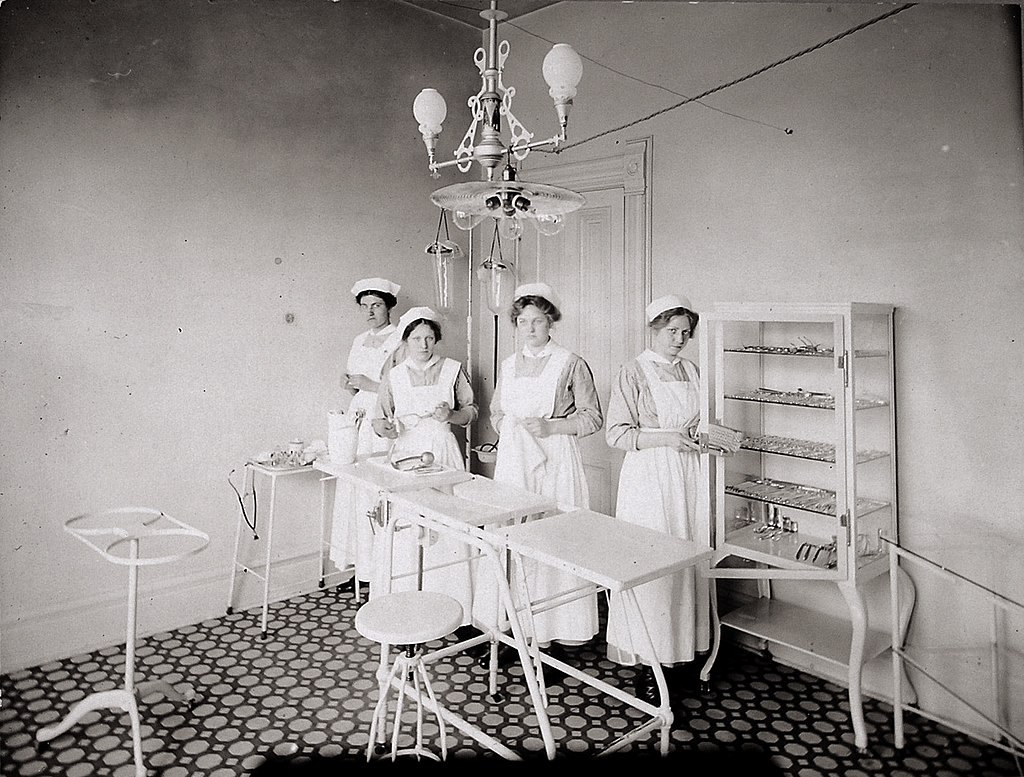
Graduates of Emanuel Hospital nursing program, 1915

Established as Emanuel Hospital in 1912 and started by Reverend Carl J. Renhard of First Immanuel Lutheran Church in Portland. A misspelling of the name 'Immanuel' occurred and was not discovered until all official documents had been signed as 'Emanuel'. The decision was to retain the 'official' name even though misspelled.

The first location of the hospital was a three-story Victorian home on Southwest Taylor Street, nicknamed the "Gingerbread House" by local residents for its appearance. Nurses lived on the third floor of the home, and because it contained no elevator system, patients were required to be carried upstairs. The cost of major surgery at the hospital was $15 (equivalent to $500 in 2025). In 1913, a nursing school was founded at the hospital under the supervision of Lutheran nun Sister Betty Hanson, who also served as the supervisor of the Columbia Medical Conference.

In December 1915, the hospital moved to a new building it constructed for $20,000 at Stanton and Commercial Streets in Albina, its current location. At that time it had 135 beds. Emanuel added a new, four-story nursing school residence in 1921 at a cost of $60,000. A $264,723 new hospital building opened in February 1926; the old building was subsequently converted to a maternity ward, which was overseen by Alice Swanman, a nurse who was a member of the hospital's second graduating class. In 1931, another expansion took place, bringing the hospital to a total of 207,000 square feet (19,200 m^{2}).

=== Mid-century development ===
In 1947, the hospital saw a record 4,328 births. In 1951, the Emanuel Institute of Pastoral Care was established, which became the first accredited Clinical Pastoral Education program in the western United States. The following year, the original 1915 hospital building was demolished to make room for renovations, which brought an additional 128 beds to the hospital (at that time making a total of 584). In 1955, DeNorval Unthank, M.D. joined the hospital staff. In 1929, Unthank was the third African-American doctor to practice medicine in Portland, and would later serve on the hospital's board of directors beginning in 1971.

The hospital opened a ward exclusively for the treatment of teenaged patients in 1957, the first of its kind in the United States. The ward received coverage in the Saturday Evening Post in 1961. The same year, the hospital officially closed its polio ward. In 1960, the hospital begin to seek expansion options to mitigate overcrowding, and hired a consultant from Minnesota to survey the land. By 1967, the hospital was planning an expansion plan consisting of a 19-block medical complex, estimating a $12.25 million cost. Per a 1970 report, the hospital had one of the largest obstetrics practices in the Pacific Northwest, with 3,650 births taking place in the hospital that year.

In 1962, the Portland Development Commission began a study for urban renewal with Emanuel, but without informing the residents until 1970, when PDC received a federal grant to condemn and clear 55 acres of supposedly blighted property. Emanuel canceled its development in 1973, but PDC sold the remaining property to Emanuel in 1980 with a 10-year timeline for its use. Fifty years after the demolition began, many of those blocks are still unused, a "visible reminder of urban neglect, broken promises and a decades-long failure of leadership" by PDC and Emanuel, and despite wiping away a key Black commercial center. Legacy Emanuel formally apologized in 2012.

=== 1972 expansion through present ===
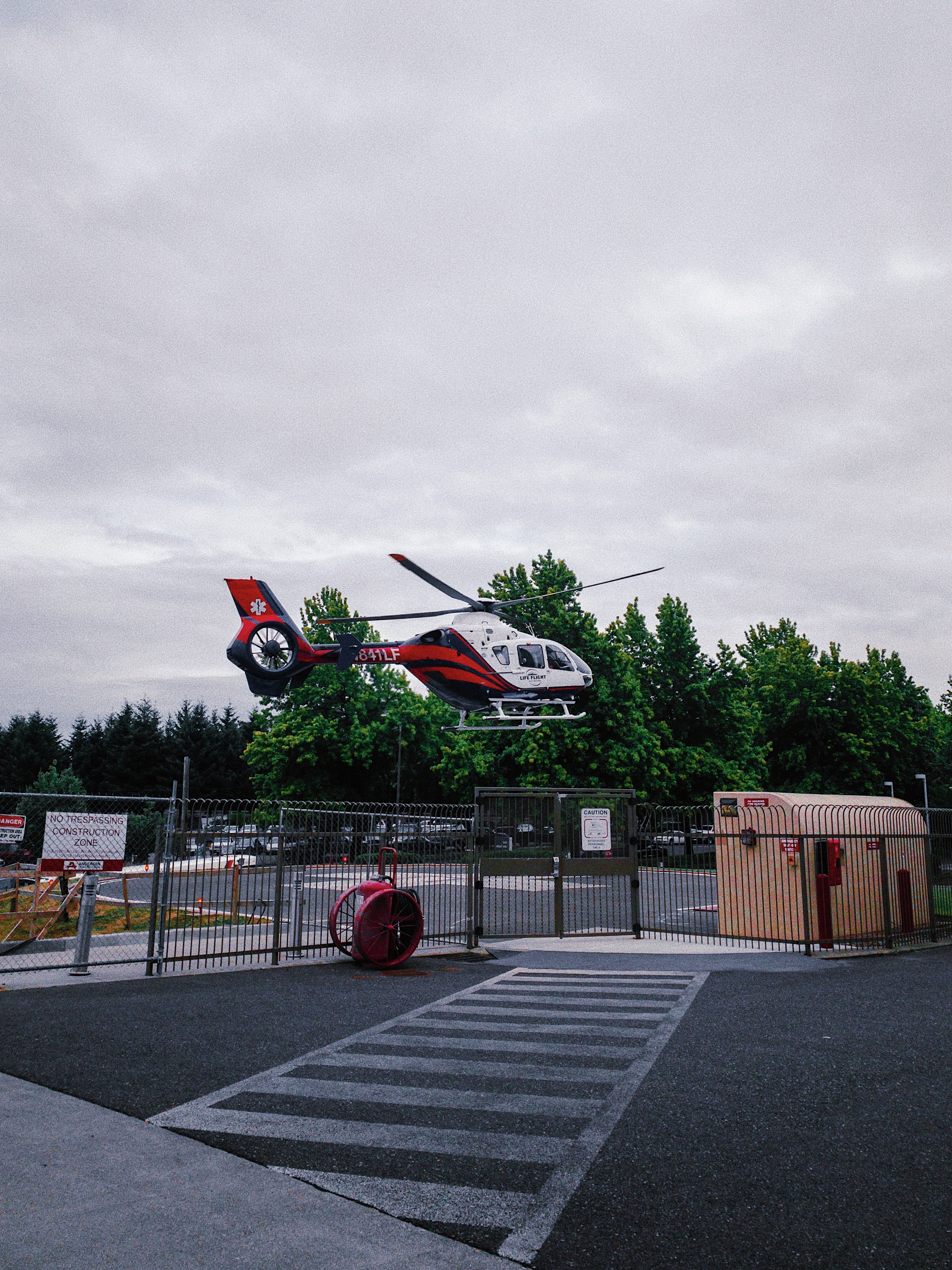
Life Flight Landing on the Lower helipad

In 1971, Physicians & Surgeons Hospital and Emanuel formed Metropolitan Hospitals, Inc. as a joint venture to build what became Legacy Meridian Park Hospital. In 1972, the hospital was expanded, and in the process 300 homes and businesses in the predominantly African-American Albina neighborhood were razed to make room for construction. In 1978, the hospital opened a helipad, and instituted the Life Flight Network, the first life-flight system on the U.S. West Coast.

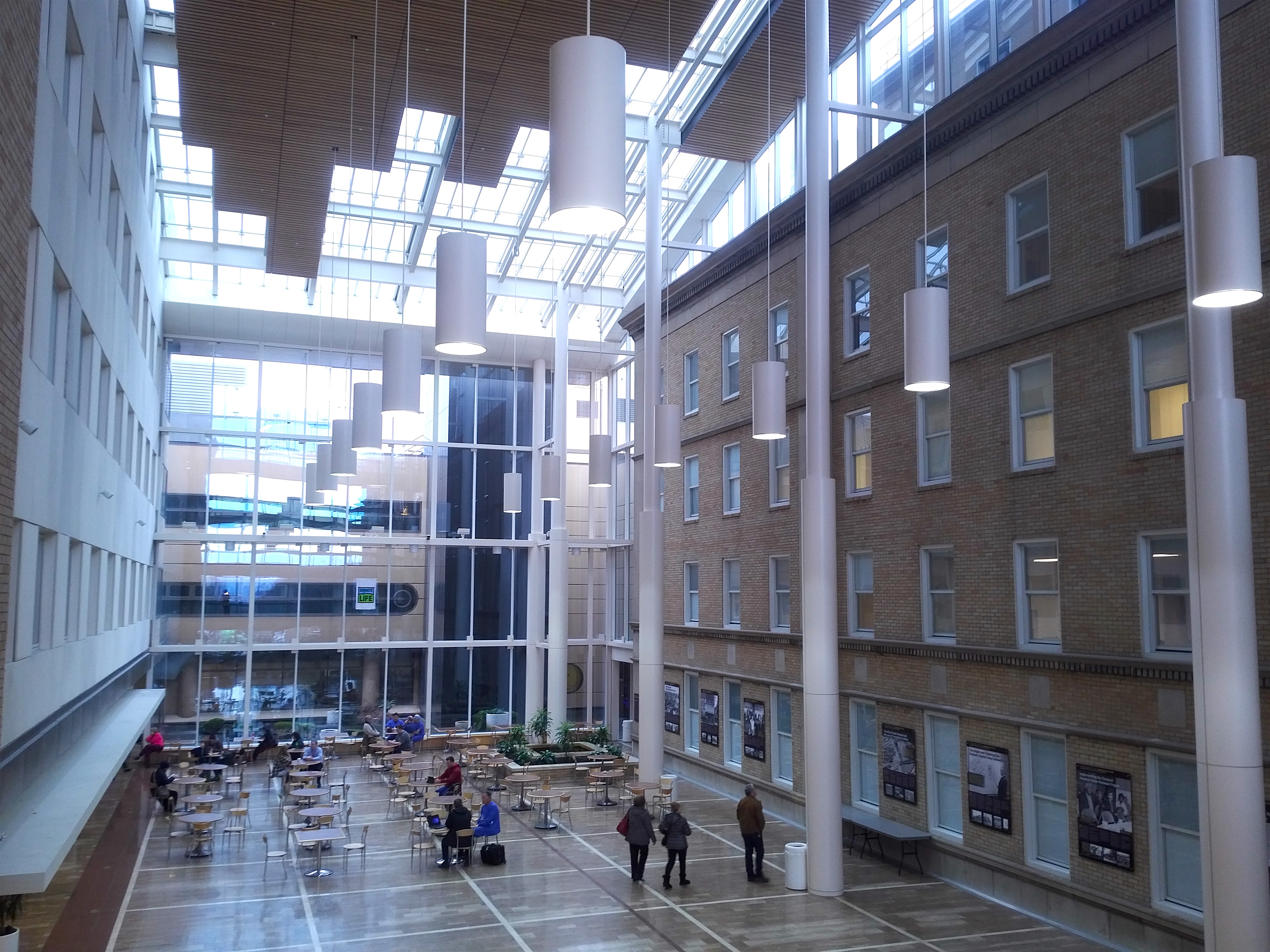
Interior atrium in 2018; west face of original 1926 hospital building on right

After becoming a holding company for the hospitals in 1983, the group became HealthLink in 1985. At that time the group operated Emanuel, Mount Hood Medical Center, Meridian Park, Holladay Park Medical Center, and Physicians & Surgeons Hospital. In 1988, Emanuel became one of only two Level I trauma centers in Oregon. The following year, HealthLink and Good Samaritan Hospital merged to create Legacy Health System.

In the early 1990s, Legacy Health and Oregon Health & Sciences University (OHSU) considered merging their pediatric inpatient services in order to consolidate spending and maximize efficiency. The Multnomah County Medical Society voted in support of a single children's hospital in Portland, but the proposal dissolved after OHSU constructed a new Doernbecher Children's Hospital building on their campus in 1994.

In February 2012, the hospital officially opened a new building to house the Randall Children's Hospital, constructed for $226 million.

== Facilities ==
Legacy Emanuel's campus includes center for burn treatment, urology, trauma, and neonatal care. The Trauma Center was designated as a Level I trauma care facility in 1988 by the state of Oregon. Emanuel's campus also includes the Children's Hospital.

=== Legacy Oregon Burn Center ===
Legacy's burn unit treats around 300 patients each year. The burn center is one of only a few in the country with a Total Contact scanner that is used to create masks for severe facial burn victims to aid in the recovery process.

=== Randall Children's Hospital at Legacy Emanuel ===
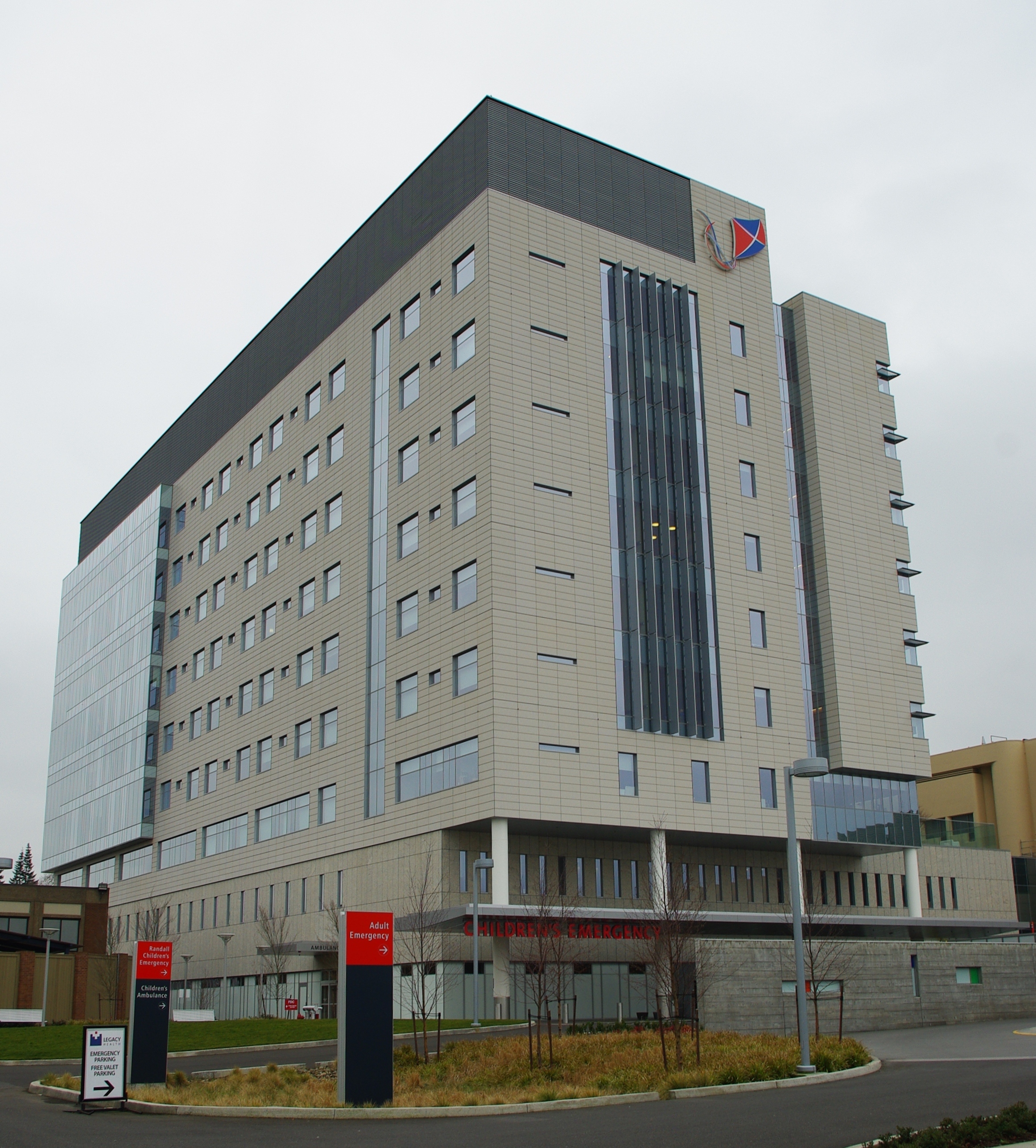
Randall Children's Hospital tower

Randall Children's Hospital at Legacy Emanuel is located on the main hospital's campus, connected to, and directly north of Legacy Emanuel Hospital. It includes a neonatal unit for newborns. Randall Children's Hospital includes a cancer treatment center with services such as neurology and neuro-oncology, and a separate emergency services department for children.

Located on the campus is a twenty-five bedroom Ronald McDonald House that opened in 1997 and provides free-of-cost housing for parents of children receiving care at the hospital as well as those receiving treatment at surrounding area facilities. The current home of Randall Children's Hospital is a nine-story building that was completed in February 2012. The $242 million expansion started in 2010 and ranks as Portland's costliest development on the inner east side since reconstruction of the Lloyd Center shopping mall nearly 20 years before. In 2011, Randall Children's hospital received its current name, which replaced its former name, the Children's Hospital, because of a $10 million donation from the Robert D. and Marcia H. Randall Charitable Trust.

=== Nurse training center ===
Legacy opened the Carl Peterson Clinical Nursing Education Center at the hospital in 2005. The training center has a number of simulation labs designed for the training and assessment of nurses. The education center is also intended to serve as a resource for training all staff not just nurses.

== Accreditation and recognition ==
Legacy Emanuel is accredited by the Joint Commission on Accreditation of Healthcare Organizations (JCAHO).

== Sources ==
- Abbott, Carl (1997). Portland: Gateway to the Northwest. American Historical Press. ISBN 978-0-965-47543-3.
- Winter, Roberta E. (2013). Unraveling U.S. Health Care: A Personal Guide. Lanham, Maryland: Rowman & Littlefield. ISBN 978-1-442-22298-4.
