= Emily L. Loveridge =

American educator, nurse, teacher (1860–1941)

Emily Lemoine Loveridge
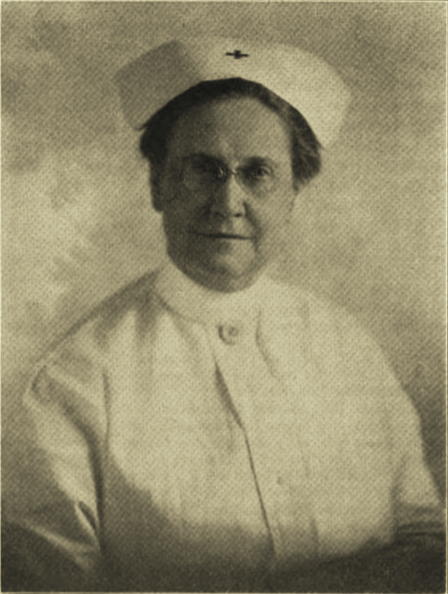
- Portrait from the American Journal of Nursing (1925)
- Born: August 28, 1860; Hammondsport, New York, U.S.
- Died: April 26, 1941 (aged 80); Portland, Oregon, U.S.
- Education: Bellevue Hospital Nursing School
- Occupations: educator; school founder; hospital superintendent
- Known for: President, Northwest Hospital Association
- Medical career
- Profession: Nurse
- Institutions: Good Samaritan Hospital
- Sub-specialties: Nurse training

Emily L. Loveridge (1860–1941) was an American nurse, educator, school founder, and hospital superintendent. She established the first nursing school in the Northwestern United States at the Good Samaritan Hospital of Portland, Oregon (1890), the hospital having been founded fifteen years earlier by the Episcopal Diocese of Oregon. In 1906, she became the hospital's superintendent and had the distinction of her hospital being the largest Protestant hospital in the U.S. having a woman as superintendent. In 1926, she was elected President of the Northwest Hospital Association.

== Early life and education ==
Emily Lemoine Loveridge was born in Hammondsport, New York, August 28, 1860. Her father, the Rev. Daniel E. Loveridge, was an Episcopal minister, who was born in Connecticut and came west from Unadilla, New York in 1888 to take charge of an Episcopal parish in Oregon. Subsequently, he went to Eugene, where he presided over the church for 11 years and then retired, his death occurring in 1908. His wife, Maria Lemoine Wolfalk was a native of Virginia, and was the adopted daughter of George Upfold, first Episcopal Bishop of Indiana. Maria died when Emily was four years of age. Emily had two siblings: George Uphold Loveridge and Mrs. Sarah L. Heslop. After the father's subsequent marriage, Emily gained two half-sisters: Mrs. John Cannon of Astoria, Oregon and Mrs. L. A. Newton of Portland.

She was graduated from the Norwich High School, Norwich, New York, and worked as a teacher in the primary grade school for six years, before deciding to devote her life to the profession of nursing.

She then completed a course in Bellevue Hospital, New York City, graduating with the class of 1890. During Loveridge's senior year, in 1890, she received an appealing letter from Emma Adams Wakeman, Good Samaritan Hospital superintendent, urging Loveridge to come to Portland, Oregon to organize the nurse training school at the hospital. Bishop Benjamin Wistar Morris, of the Episcopal Diocese of Oregon visited New York to interview Loveridge after transacting diocesan business in Philadelphia.

== Career ==
=== Nursing school founder ===
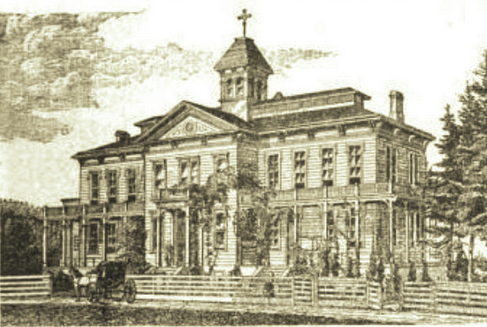
Good Samaritan Hospital (1881)

Loveridge's first reaction was that she thought it inconceivable that anyone could be happy outside of New York. However, she felt it her Christian duty to make some sacrifice and agreed to accept the responsibility for one year. She left Unadilla, New York, and came to the west on May 1, 1890, to organize the training school for nurses at the Good Samaritan Hospital that year. This was the first nurses' training school established in the Pacific Northwest and one of the pioneer schools west of the Mississippi River, for at that time there were few nursing schools outside of the large medical centers of the Eastern and Midwestern U.S.

During Loveridge's first month at the hospital, candidates for the training school were interviewed and on June 1, 1890, a class of six women was admitted. At this time, the hospital consisted of a two-story wooden building accommodating 50 patients. An addition, providing extra accommodation for ten private and ten ward patients had been completed but not occupied.

The hospital was under the direct supervision of Wakeman, Loveridge serving under her. Quarters for the nurses were provided by constructing 6 feet (1.8 m) partitions, dividing a large room of the hospital to accommodate three single and three double beds. Later, four rooms were fitted up in the basement for the nurses' sleeping quarters. Outside the hospital, there was only one graduate nurse in Portland. Instruction for the first class included a few lectures by physicians and classwork conducted by Loveridge on three evenings a week. Loveridge's mornings were taken up in preparing patients for surgery and she also served as head nurse during operations. Her afternoons were spent in boiling catgut, making and sterilizing dressings, cleaning instruments, sharpening scalpels, and writing up charts and nurses' records. She was frequently constrained (there being no elevator) to carry alone, or with assistance, patients from one floor to another. She served as superintendent of the training school for nurses until 1906. At the same time, Loveridge actively cooperated with and assisted, Wakeman, the hospital superintendent.

=== Hospital superintendent ===
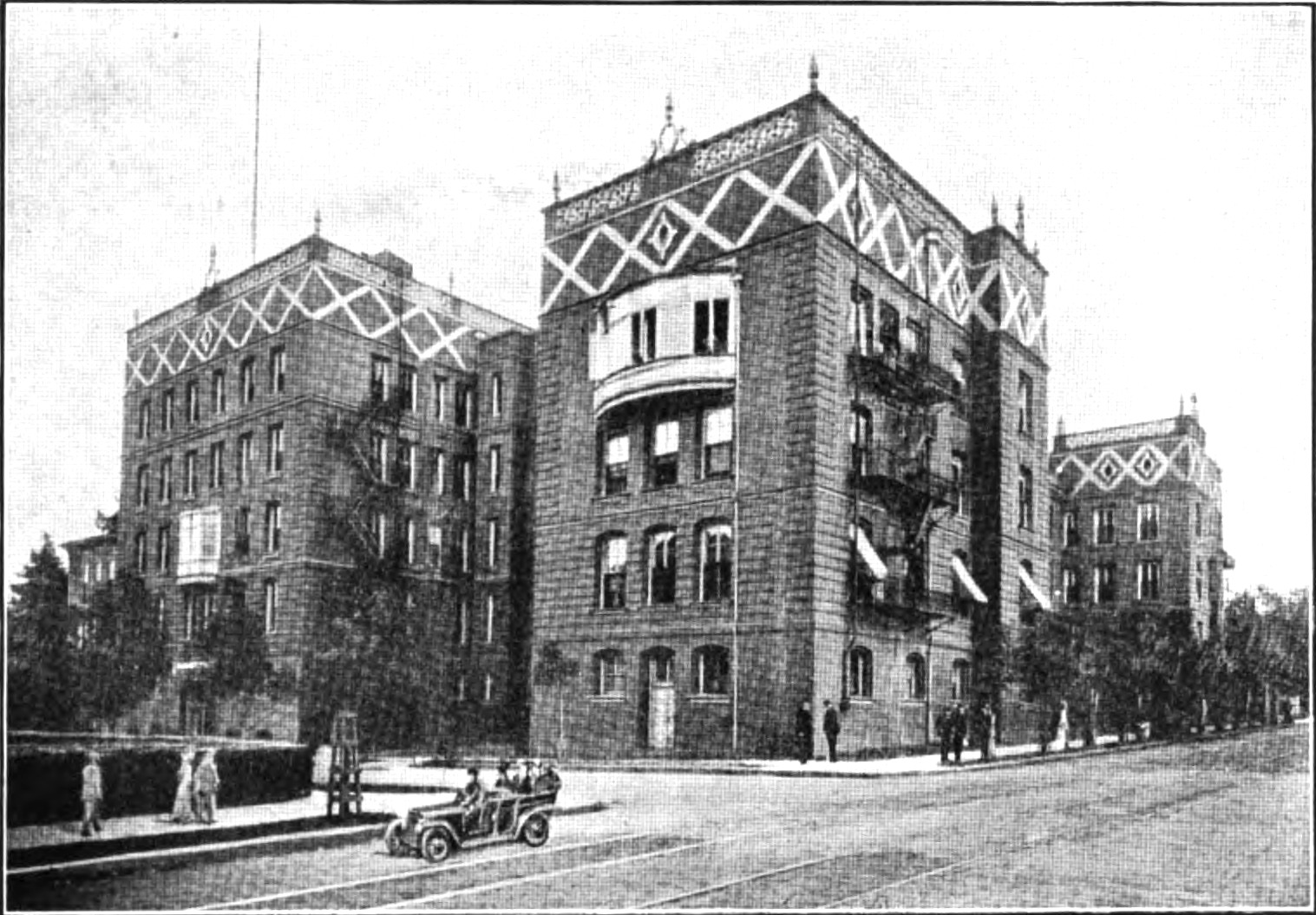
Good Samaritan Hospital (1910)

In 1906, Loveridge became the superintendent of the Good Samaritan Hospital, Wakeman having resigned on account of ill health. The institution had 300 beds at the time, with 133 nurses in attendance.

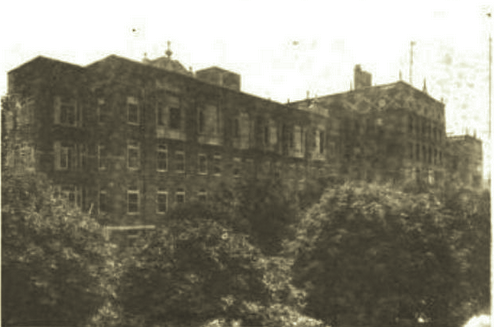
Good Samaritan Hospital (1926)

Loveridge recognized the necessity for improvements in hospital construction and equipment. It was through her influence with the public and the medical and nursing professions that such construction and equipment were promptly provided. Thus, when the standardization of the hospital was urged, it was easy for the institution quickly to comply with all the standardization requirements specified by the American College of Surgeons. These transitions in construction and equipment called for a revolution of the hospital's finances which was soon brought about by Loveridge's organizing ability.

Loveridge also took an active interest in other hospitals, becoming president of the Northwest Hospital Association. She conducted an inspection tour of Eastern hospitals studying physiotherapy equipment before establishing such a department in her hospital.

== Personal life ==
Loveridge reared two of her sister's children, Ernestine Heslop, who was graduated from University of California, Berkeley; and Paul Loveridge Heslop, who was graduated from Cornell University as a civil engineer.

Emily Lemoine Loveridge died in Portland, Oregon, April 26, 1941.
