= Providence St. Vincent Medical Center =

- Providence Health & Services
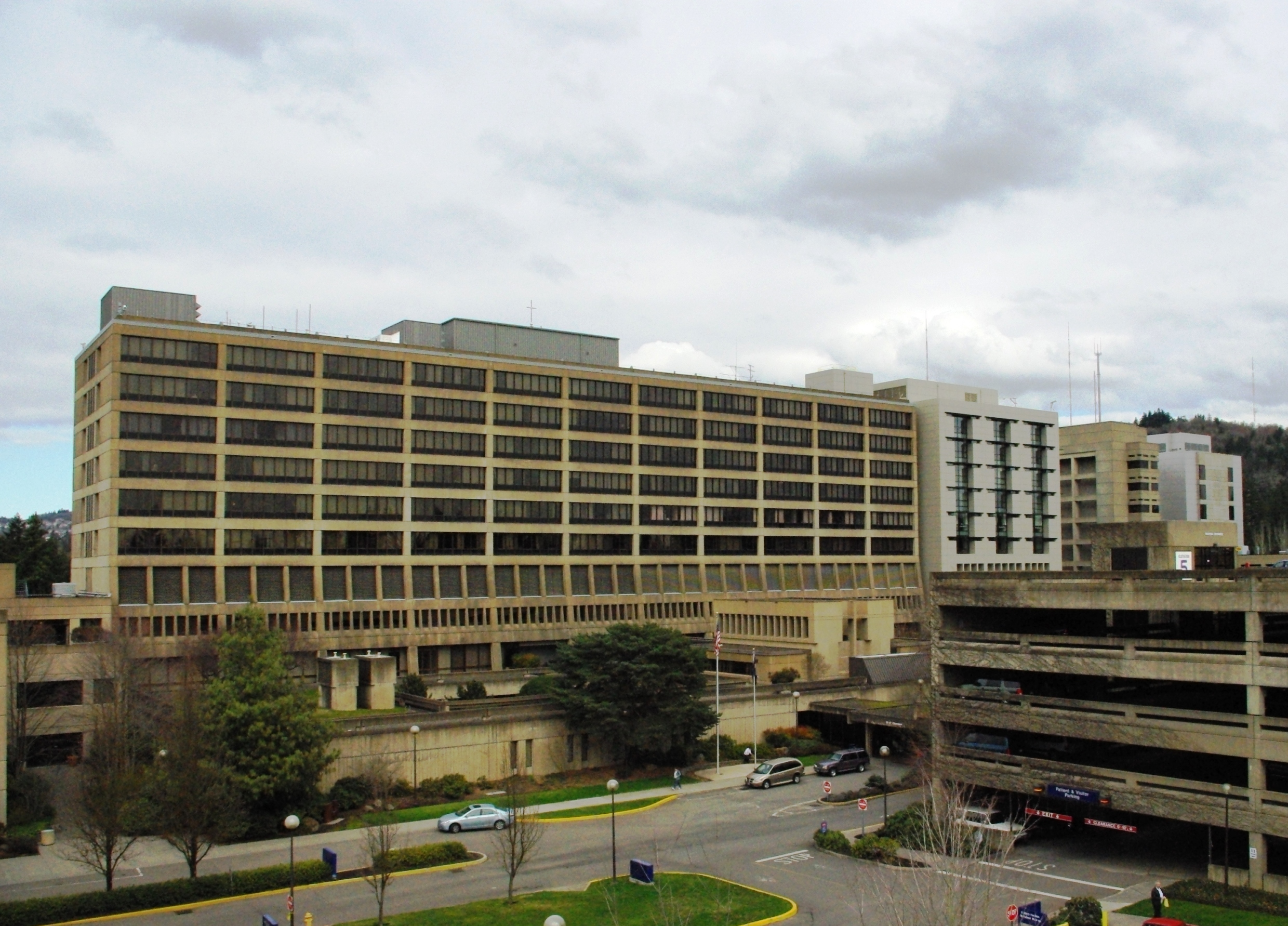

Geography
- Location: West Haven-Sylvan area, near Beaverton, Oregon and Portland, in Washington County, Oregon, United States
- Coordinates: 45.510°N 122.7718°W

Organization
- Care system: Medicare/Medicaid/Charity/Public
- Type: General
- Affiliated university: None

Services
- Beds: 523

History
- Founded: 1875

Links
- Website: www.providence.org/stvincent
- Lists: Hospitals in Oregon

Providence St. Vincent Medical Center is a not for profit, acute care teaching hospital in an unincorporated section of Washington County, Oregon, in the West Haven-Sylvan area north of Beaverton, Oregon and west of Portland, Oregon, United States (Note: While the hospital is located in an unincorporated portion of the West Haven-Sylvan area, its street address is listed as Portland, Oregon.) – and within the Portland metropolitan area. The hospital was founded in 1875 by the Sisters of Providence, a Roman Catholic sisterhood from Montreal, Quebec, Canada. It is Providence Health & Services’s largest Oregon hospital.

== History ==
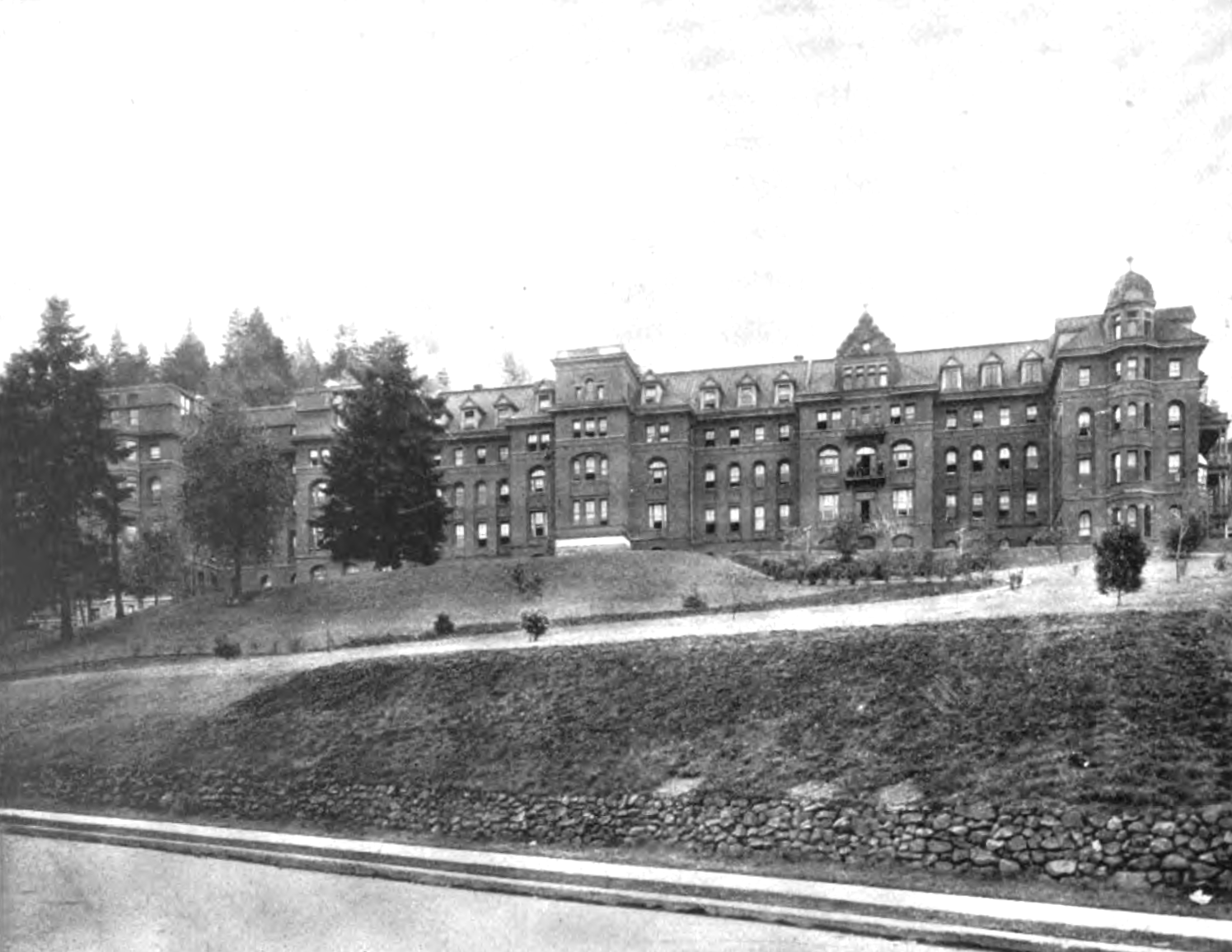
2nd St. Vincent Hospital building in Portland, c. 1910.

Dedicated on July 19, 1875, St. Vincent Hospital was the state's first permanent hospital, founded in the Northwest district of Portland, Oregon, by the Sisters of Providence, a Roman Catholic sisterhood from Montreal, Quebec, Canada.

In January 1971, the original campus in northwest Portland was closed and the current facility opened in Washington County. On January 31, 1971, the hospital used in-part large military buses capable of carrying 18 stretchers at a time to transport patients to the new hospital building. The facility at that time had a single, 13-story tower that consisted of seven floors of patient rooms. The new building had 400 hospital beds, while the old hospital had 420 beds.

=== Post-millennium ===
In 2004, the hospital was one of three in Oregon named by Solucient as a top 100 hospital in the United States. In November 2009, the employees at the hospital, in conjunction with Medline Industries, produced the "Pink Glove Dance" video (set to "Down") to raise awareness of breast cancer, with the video going viral on the Internet and making national news.

In October 2015, work began on a four-year, $85 million remodeling of the nine-story main hospital building, which was built in 1971. Along with seismic retrofitting and modest expansion, the project added a new aluminum exterior over the building's existing exposed-concrete surface, greatly changing its appearance when completed.

== Programs and institutes ==
St. Vincent has specialized programs including Providence Heart and Vascular Institute, Oregon Medical Laser Center, Providence Multiple Sclerosis Center, and Providence Stroke Center. The hospital is licensed for 523 beds, and has over 3,500 employees. There are approximately 1,647 medical staff. Providence St. Vincent Medical Center is also one of four nursing magnet hospitals in Portland, the others being Providence Portland Medical Center, Oregon Health & Science University Hospital, and the Portland Veterans Affairs Medical Center.
