= Legacy Holladay Park Medical Center =

- Legacy Health

Geography
- Location: Portland, Multnomah County, Oregon, United States
- Coordinates: 45°31′55″N 122°39′51″W

History
- Opened: 1893
- Closed: 1994

Links
- Lists: Hospitals in Oregon

Legacy Holladay Park Medical Center was a hospital located in Portland, Oregon, United States. It was founded in 1893 as Hahnemann Hospital. By 1947 the hospital had 100 beds, and that year it changed its name to Holladay Park Hospital with plans to expand to 200 beds. With a 1985 merger with Physicians & Surgeons Hospital (which had been known as Coffey Memorial Hospital until 1945), the name was changed to Holladay Park Medical Center. At that time both hospitals were part of Metropolitan Hospitals, Inc. that had been formed by Physicians & Surgeons Hospital and Emanuel Hospital. After becoming part of Legacy Health when it was formed in 1989, Legacy closed the then 171-bed hospital in 1994. As of 2014, the former hospital was used by Legacy as the Legacy Research Institute. Legacy proposed converting the building into an emergency room for psychiatric patients in 2014 after the Legacy Research Institute moved to a new building. Legacy, Oregon Health & Science University, Adventist Health, and Kaiser Permanente agreed to operate the ER, with a planned opening in 2016. The facility became Unity Center for Behavioral Health.
