= Providence Portland Medical Center =

- Providence Health & Services
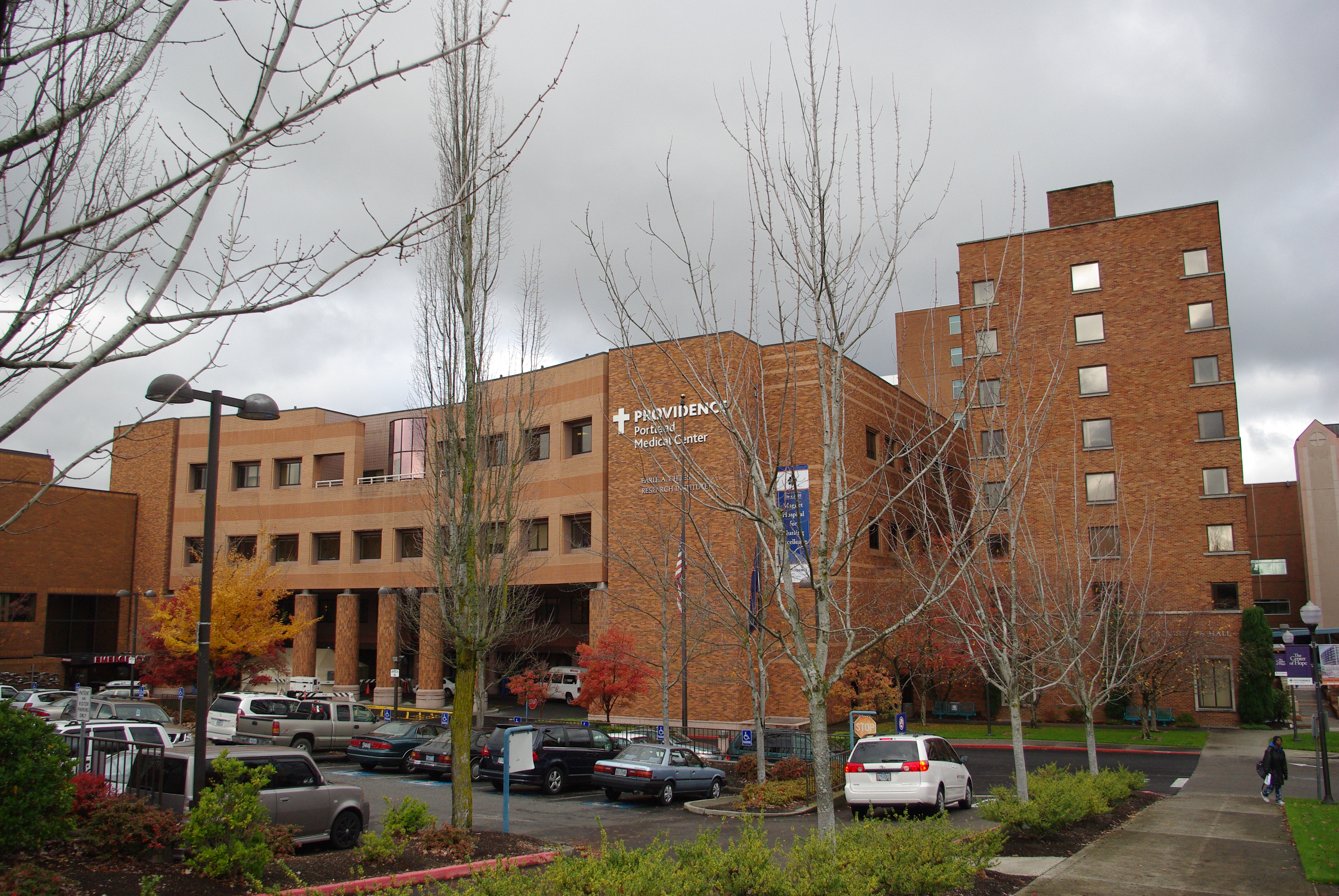

Geography
- Location: 4805 NE Glisan St, Portland, OR, Oregon, United States
- Coordinates: 45.5275°N 122.6134°W

Organization
- Care system: Medicare/Medicaid/Charity/Public
- Type: General

Services
- Beds: 483

History
- Opened: 1941

Links
- Website: www.providence.org
- Lists: Hospitals in Oregon

Providence Portland Medical Center, located at 4805 NE Glisan St. in the North Tabor neighborhood of Portland, Oregon, is a full-service medical center specializing in cancer and cardiac care. Opened in 1941, the hospital is licensed for 483 beds, and has over 3,000 employees. There are approximately 1,000 physicians on staff. The campus is also home to Providence Child Center, a 58-bed facility dedicated exclusively to medically fragile children. Providence Portland Medical Center is part of the Providence Health & Services in Oregon. Providence Portland Medical Center is one of four nursing magnet hospitals in Oregon, the others being Providence St. Vincent Medical Center, Veterans Affairs hospital, and OHSU Hospital in Portland.

== History ==
The Catholic Sisters of Providence order was asked to expand their healthcare offerings on the east side of Portland in 1937. At that time, Archbishop Edward D. Howard requested that the order construct a hospital, originally to be named St. Vincent Hospital East, in reference to the existing St. Vincent Hospital (now Providence St. Vincent Medical Center), which at that time was located in Northwest Portland. The next year the Sisters' plans to build a hospital in the Laurelhurst area were approved and they began buying property at Northeast 47th and Glisan.

Providence Hospital opened in September 1941. A new cancer tower was constructed in the late 2000s, which added 150 new inpatient beds. The 11 story tower houses cancer, surgery, and state-of-the-art patient care facilities. In 2011, the last nuns housed at a convent located within the main building left the facility.

== Details ==
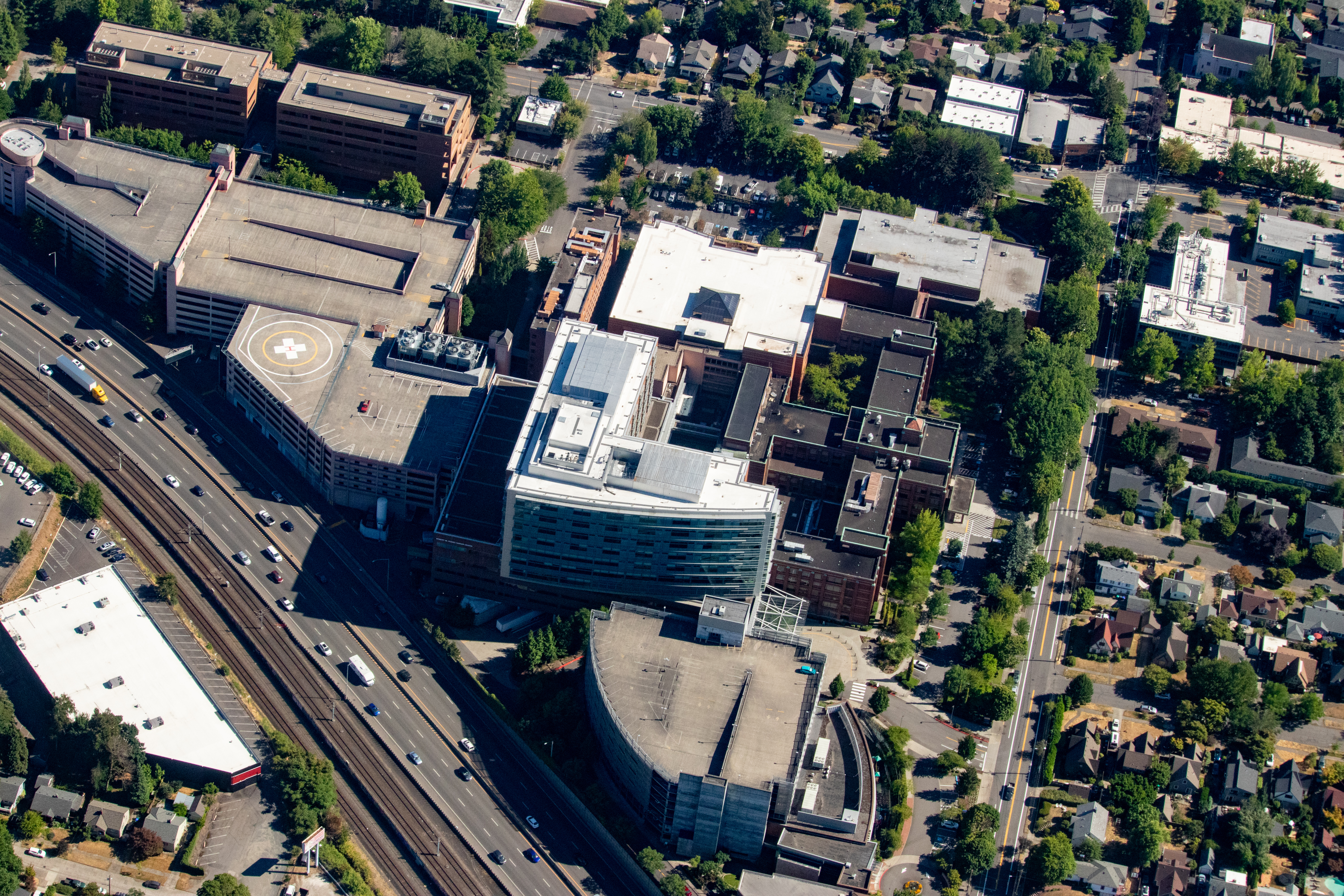
Providence Portland Medical Center and heliport aerial, 2023

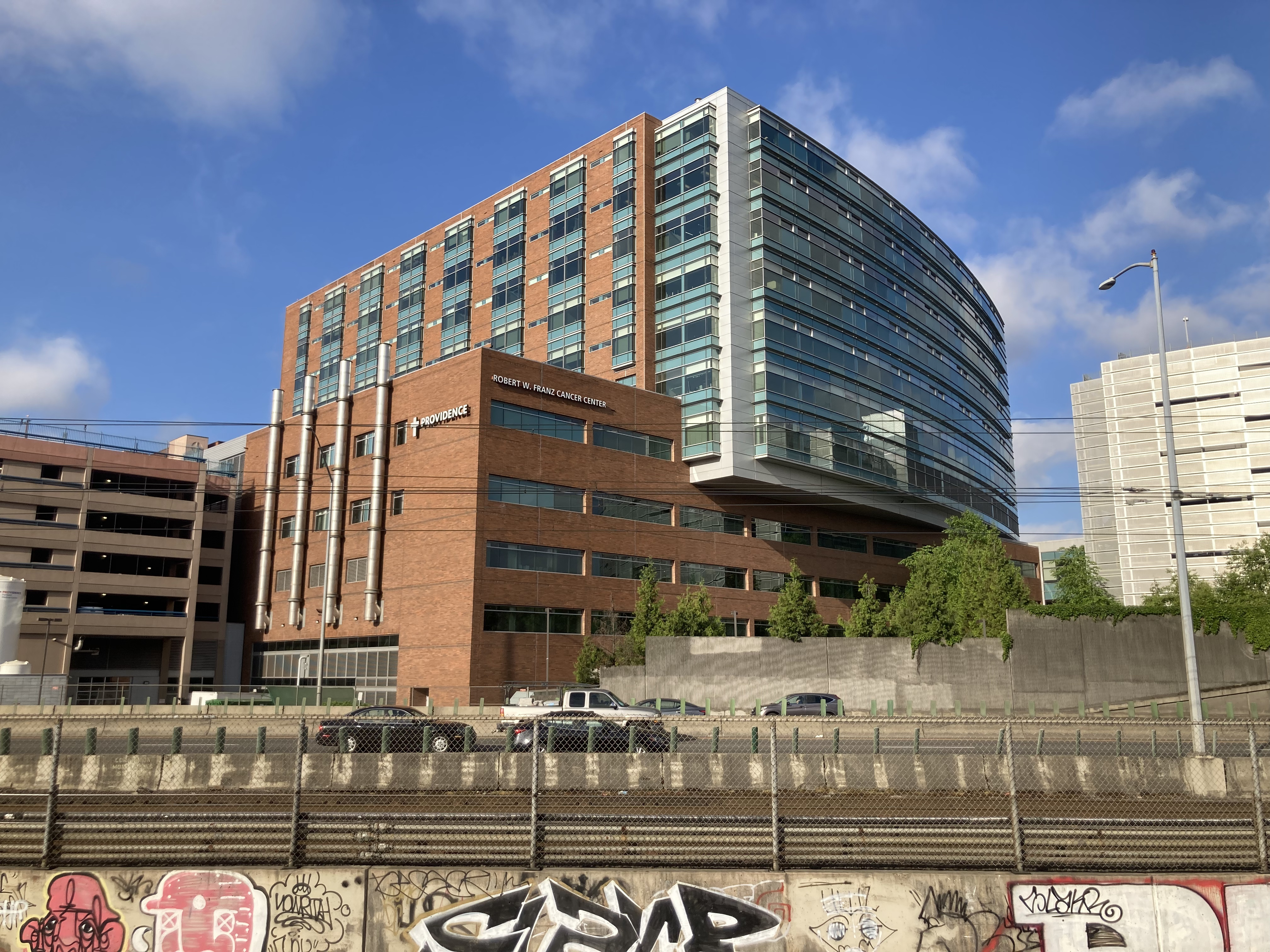
View from the north

The hospital has 483 licensed beds (397 are staffed), and in 2012 had 21,351 admissions and 63,299 emergency department visits. It has 3,160 employees, of which 1,200 are physicians. Services offered at Providence include oncology, surgical, maternity, women's health, behavioral health, cardiac care, radiology, orthopedics, pharmacy, sleep disorders, urology, and vascular, among others. For 2012, the facility had $1,167,746,000 in patient charges and an operating income of $8,414,000.

== See also ==
- List of hospitals in Oregon
