= Legacy Salmon Creek Medical Center =

- Legacy Health

Geography
- Location: Vancouver, Washington, United States
- Coordinates: 45.72071°N 122.64807°W

Organization
- Type: General

History
- Opened: 2005

Links
- Lists: Hospitals in Washington state

Legacy Salmon Creek Medical Center is an acute care hospital in Vancouver, Washington, United States. It is part of Legacy Health, a locally owned, nonprofit organization based in Portland, Oregon.

Legacy Salmon Creek opened in 2005 as the first hospital built in Washington state in almost 20 years. The six-story, 460,000-square-foot hospital and 180,000-square-foot medical office complex cost $285 million. In the hospital's first full fiscal year, Legacy Salmon Creek averaged 80 patients a day. By 2015, the average hospital census was more than 160 patients a day.

Legacy Salmon Creek employs more than 1,200 people.

Among its services are Legacy Cancer Institute, a children's-only emergency room, neonatal intensive care unit, birthing center, total joint (orthopedics) surgery center, breast health center and surgical care.
