= Legacy Health =

Nonprofit hospital system in Portland, Oregon, United States

- Type: Not-for-profit healthcare, not-for-profit hospitals
- Industry: Healthcare
- Founded: 1989
- Headquarters: Portland, Oregon, United States
- Key people: Dr. Susan Huang (president & CEO)
- Number of employees: 14,000
- Website: Legacy Health

Legacy Health is a non-profit hospital system located in Portland, Oregon, United States. It consists of six primary-care hospitals, a children's hospital, and allied clinics and outpatient facilities. The system employs about 14,000 staff members, and is the second-largest system in the Portland metro area, after Providence Health & Services.

== History ==
The beginnings of Legacy Health date to 1875 with the foundation of Good Samaritan Hospital. Emanuel Hospital started in 1912, which in 1971 joined with the Physicians & Surgeons Hospital to form Metropolitan Hospitals in order to build Meridian Park Hospital. Also in 1971, Emanuel purchased Gresham Community Hospital, which later became Legacy Mount Hood Medical Center.

Metropolitan Hospitals became a holding company for the hospitals in 1983, and was renamed to HealthLink in 1985. Holladay Park Hospital had joined the group by then, and closed in 1994. Physicians & Surgeons Hospital had started in 1945, and in 1986 became CareUnit Hospital of Portland for alcohol dependency treatments, which closed in 1987. In 1989, HealthLink and Good Samaritan Hospital merged to create Legacy Health System. It was renamed in 2010 as Legacy Health.

Legacy explored an integration with Oregon Health & Science University to create a combined health system in August 2023. The acquisition was called off in 2025.

== Facilities ==
The system's hospitals are: Legacy Emanuel Medical Center, Randall Children's Hospital at Legacy Emanuel, Legacy Good Samaritan Medical Center, Legacy Meridian Park Medical Center, Legacy Silverton Medical Center, and Legacy Mount Hood Medical Center in Oregon; and Legacy Salmon Creek Medical Center in Washington. In the spring of 2017, Legacy, in partnership with three other health systems, opened the Unity Center for Behavioral Health.

Legacy hosts several specialized institutes and research centers, including Legacy Cancer Institute, the Legacy Devers Eye Institute, the Legacy Weight and Diabetes Institute, the Legacy Rehabilitation Institute of Oregon, the Legacy Oregon Burn Center, Legacy Research Center, the Legacy Biomechanics Laboratory, and the Robert S. Dow Neurobiology Laboratories. It also runs Legacy Medical Group, and has major partnerships and collaborations in Legacy-GoHealth Urgent Care, Legacy Health Partners (collection of medical practices), and PacificSource HealthPlans.

Legacy's hospitals and related services are accredited by the Joint Commission.

In 2023, Legacy sold its laboratories to LabCorp impacting about 700 employees.
