= Randall Children's Hospital =

- Legacy Health

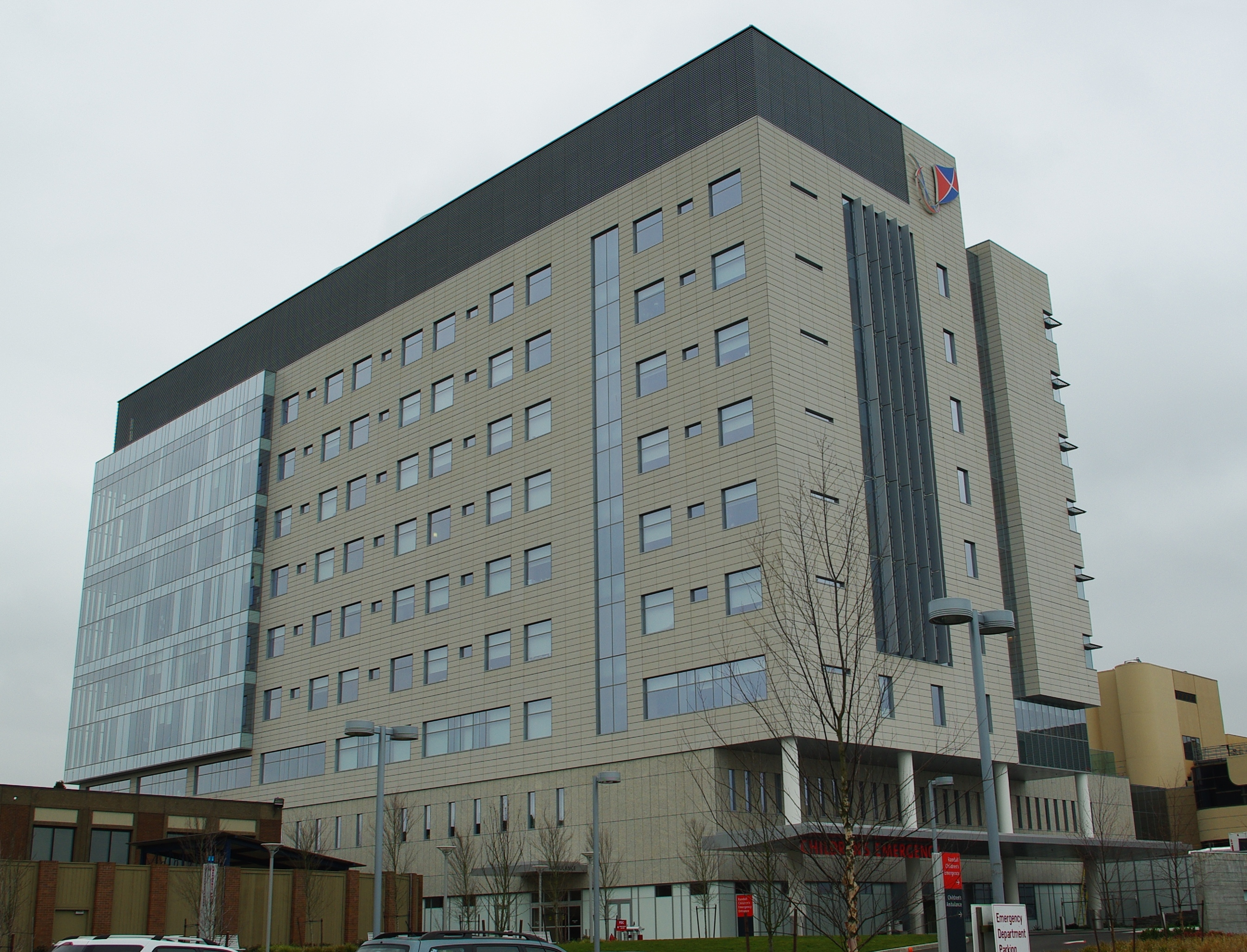
- Randall Children's Hospital tower

Geography
- Location: Portland, Multnomah County, Oregon, United States
- Coordinates: 45.5446°N 122.6700°W

Organization
- Care system: Not for Profit
- Type: Pediatric

Services
- Beds: 165

Links
- Website: www.legacyhealth.org/locations/hospitals/randall-childrens-hospital-at-legacy-emanuel.aspx
- Lists: Hospitals in Oregon

Randall Children's Hospital is the children's hospital at Legacy Emanuel Medical Center in Portland in the U.S. state of Oregon. Formerly Legacy Emanuel Children's Hospital, it was renamed in 2011 during construction of the new 165-bed patient tower.

== History ==
Emanuel started what it originally called the Children's Hospital in 1960. Ronald McDonald House Charities opened a house at the hospital in 1997. Construction on a new nine-story tower for the hospital began in 2007. The $250 million project was designed by ZGF Architects and includes the first emergency department in the state only for pediatrics. The new 334,000-square-foot (31,000 m^{2}) separate structure was built by Hoffman Construction. In September 2011, the Robert D. and Marcia H. Randall Charitable Trust donated $10 million to Legacy Health for the new facility, which was then renamed as the Randall Children's Hospital. The new tower opened in February 2012.

== Services ==
Randall Children's Hospital offers a variety of pediatric services including burns, oncology, dentistry, ENT, emergency medicine, eye care, orthopedics, surgical, a neonatal ICU, audiology, urgent care, sleep disorders, rheumatology, and radiology, amongst others.

== Building ==
The 334,000-square-foot (31,000 m^{2}) tower that houses the hospital was designed by ZGF Architects and built by Hoffman Construction. The nine-story building contains 165 private rooms, plus a day surgery area with 22 beds.
