= Veterans Affairs Medical Center (Oregon) =

Hospital in Portland, Oregon, U.S.

Veterans Affairs Medical Center (Portland, Oregon)
- United States Department of Veterans Affairs

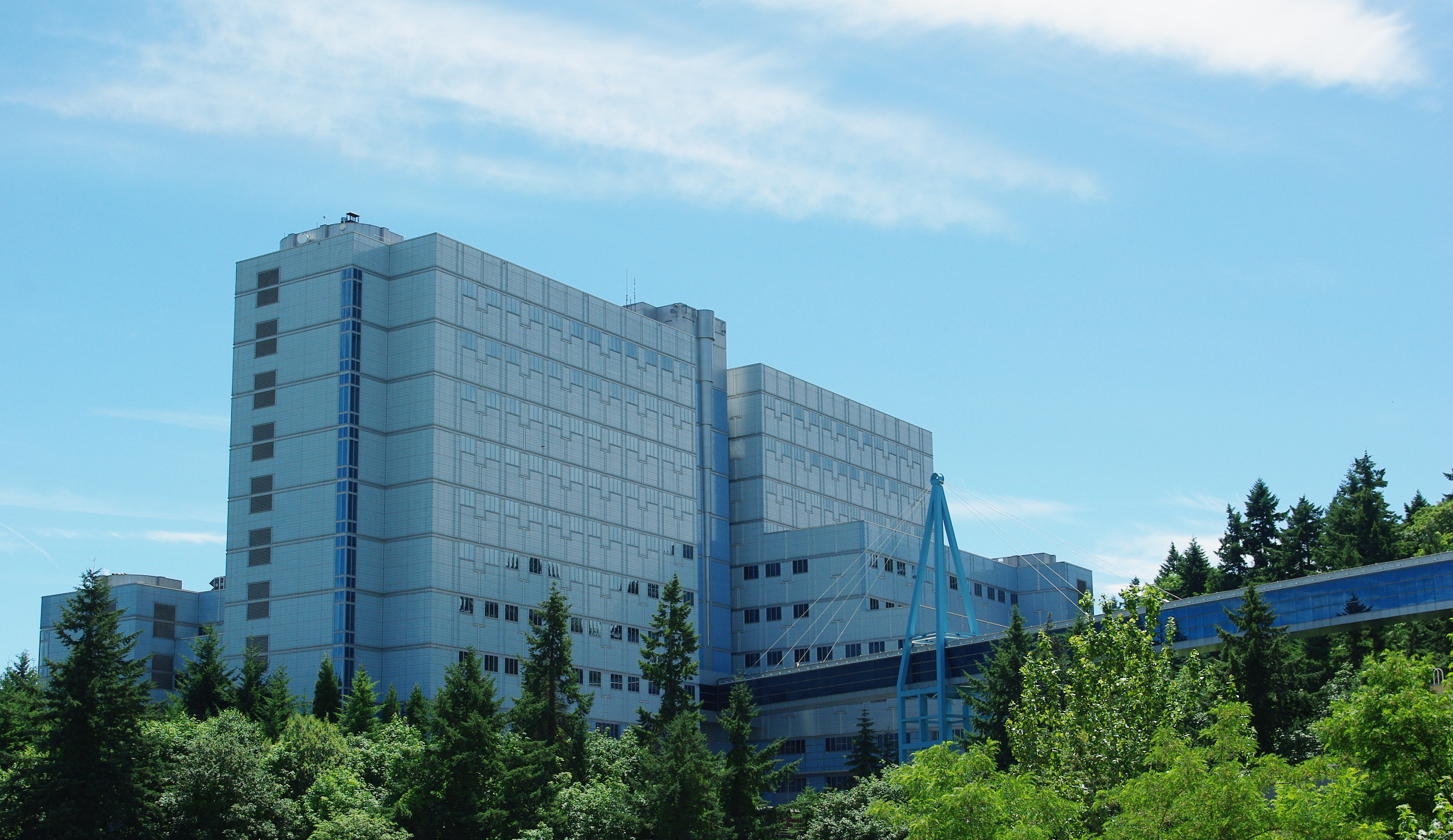

Geography
- Location: 3710 SW US Veteran Hospital Road, Portland, Oregon, United States
- Coordinates: 45.49707°N 122.6836°W

Organization
- Care system: Veterans
- Type: Acute care

Services
- Beds: 227

Links
- Website: www.va.gov/portland-health-care/locations/portland-va-medical-center/
- Lists: Hospitals in Oregon

Veterans Affairs Medical Center (Portland VA) is a 160-bed, acute care medical facility opened in 1929 by the Oregon Department of Veterans' Affairs, located on Marquam Hill in Portland, adjacent to Oregon Health & Sciences University, and is connected to Oregon Health & Science University Hospital via a skybridge. The original hospital was replaced in the 1980s and had a capacity of up-to 478 beds.

== History ==
The University of Oregon Medical School's regents (now Oregon Health & Science University) donated land on Marquam Hill in 1926 to what is now the Department of Veterans Affairs. The property was to be used to construct a veterans hospital, with construction starting in February 1928. Offices opened at the new facility in November 1928, and patients were transferred to the new hospital in December 1928. In 1932, an administration building opened, followed by 13 quonset huts from 1946 to 1948 following World War II. The last addition to the old campus came in 1949 when a 155-bed tuberculosis hospital opened. The Portland VA started working with the adjacent medical school in 1946 on joint programs.

The Veterans Administration announced in May 1976 that a new hospital would be built in Portland. A local group formed in 1980 to fight construction, and went to court in 1981 to try to stop the project. A new building was finished in 1981 in order to move some operations away from the planned location of the new hospital building. The suit was eventually dismissed in October 1981 by judge Robert C. Belloni, and in January 1982 the design of the new building was unveiled as construction started. The new building was designed by Skidmore, Owings & Merrill and Zimmer Gunsul Frasca Partnership (now ZGF Architects LLP), with W.B. Bateson Co. serving as the general contractor.

Construction ended in September 1987 on the main building, and it was dedicated in November 1987. In February 1988, the new $136 million facility opened to patients on Marquam Hill after a 364-day delay in construction, and demolition of the old buildings started in May 1988. When the new facility opened, it had a capacity of 478 beds, but never had staffing to operate at full capacity, and as of 1990 only used 399 beds. The final phase of construction was a $11.7 million, 413-space parking garage built starting in 1990.

In 1992, a 660-foot (200 m) long pedestrian bridge linking OHSU Hospital and the VA Hospital opened. The $7.4 million bridge is the longest of its type in North America. Due to staffing problems the VA closed its emergency room at night in April 1994.

Due to budget cuts, the facility announced 150 layoffs in June 1996. At that time, the hospital's budget was $140 million, which grew to $192 million in 2000. In July 2006, the hospital opened a new $3.7 million, 20,000-square-foot (1,900 m^{2}) center for hearing disabilities. The Portland VA served 33,000 patients in 2000, 51,000 patients in 2004, which grew to 80,000 in 2012.

== Details ==
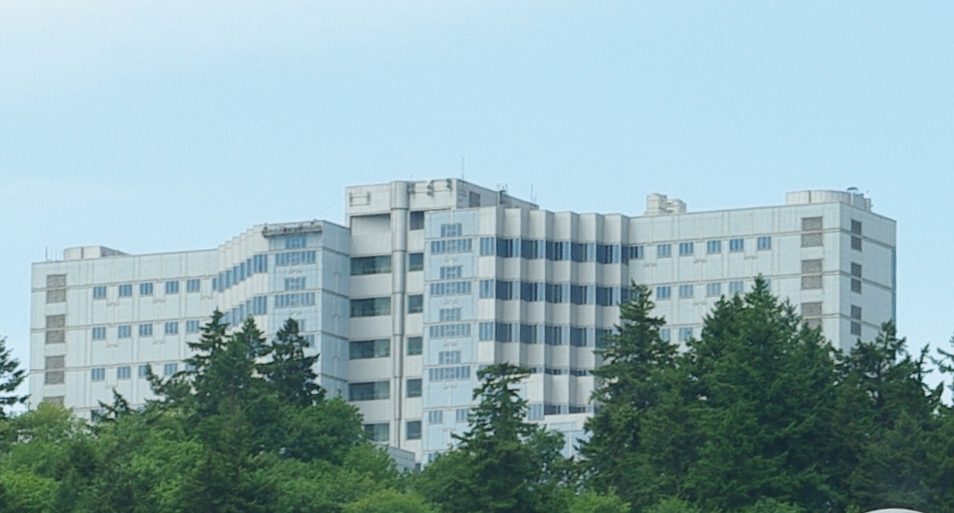
Front of the facility

Services at the 160-bed medical center's campus include primary care, radiology, speech and language pathology, social work, prosthetics, rehabilitation, emergency care, a pharmacy, and laboratory services, among others. The acute care medical center is accredited by The Joint Commission, and has approximately 80,000 visitors annually.

The 127.77-foot (38.94 m) main building has nine stories above ground plus a penthouse, and two underground floors. The steel and concrete high-rise building has a total of 684,985 square feet (63,637.2 m^{2}) of space. Overall, the campus has 1,532,254 square feet (142,351.1 m^{2}) of space. The 660-foot (200 m) long pedestrian bridge linking the medical center to OHSU Hospital was constructed with 2.4 million pounds (1,100 long tons; 1,200 short tons) of steel and is supported by two towers, each 150 feet (46 m) tall.
