= Life Flight Network =

Health service provision

Life Flight Network is a nonprofit air and ground critical care transport service based in Aurora, Oregon, in the northern Willamette Valley, with services in Oregon, Washington, Idaho, and Montana in the United States.

== Operations ==
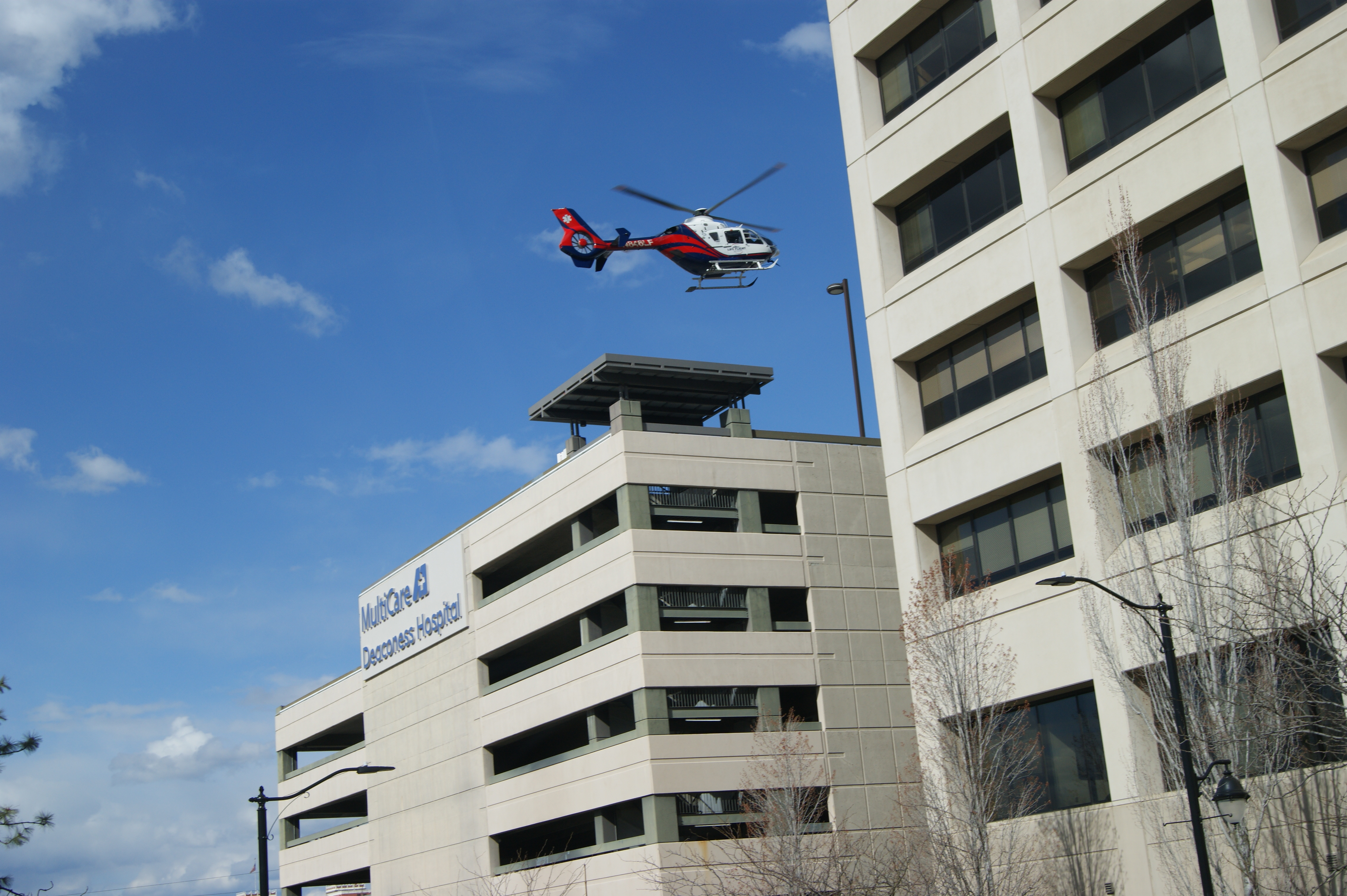
Life Flight helicopter landing on the MultiCare Deaconess Hospital helipad in Spokane, Washington

=== Service area ===
It has 29 air medical bases throughout the Columbia, Willamette and Snake river watersheds.

=== Bases ===
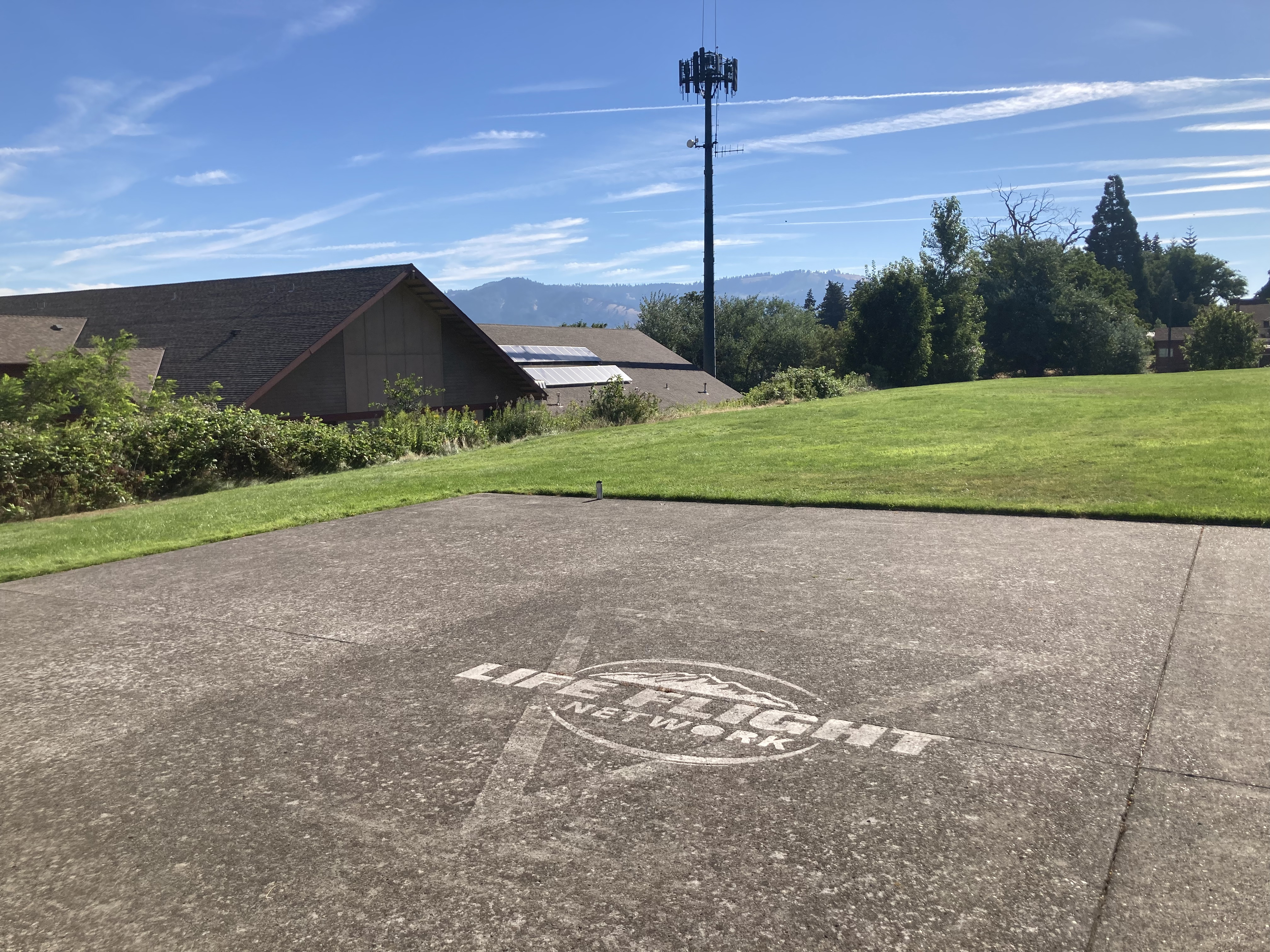
Landing site in Hood River, Oregon

Life Flight Network operates bases across the Pacific Northwest in Washington, Oregon, Idaho, and Montana.

- In Oregon there are bases in Aurora, Cottage Grove, Newport, Astoria, Pendleton, Redmond, Ontario, La Grande, Hermiston, and Salem.
- In Washington there are bases in Hoquiam, Kelso, Brewster, Moses Lake, Richland, Pullman, Spokane, Dallesport, Port Angeles, Coupeville, and Walla Walla.
- In Idaho there are bases at Boise, Burley, Sandpoint, Lewiston, and Coeur d'Alene.
- In Montana there are bases in Missoula, Butte, and Bozeman.
- It also has fixed-wing bases in Aurora, Boise, Dallesport, Moses Lake, La Grande, Richland, Butte, Lewiston, and Port Angeles.

LifeFlight gained part 135 certification in 2013 from the Boise Idaho FSDO.

In 2013 LifeFlight chose the Agusta 119KX as its helicopter platform leasing them for 10 years from a Chinese firm. Arizona-based Tri-State Care Flight assisted LFN in bridging the gap by allowing LFN to operate their new aircraft under Tri-State's 135 certificate while maintaining in-service status and attaining their own part 135 certificate.

Currently, LFN is dissolving its A119Kx fleet and replacing them with Bell 429s and Bell 407s as the 10-year lease is coming due.

=== Recent History and Expansion ===
In 2015, LFN was awarded the coveted "Program of the Year" award by the Association of Air Medical Services.

In 2020, at the request of its owner hospital consortium, LFN began to expand its ground presence in the Portland metro area to include BLS, ALS, and wheelchair van transport services.

In March 2021, LFN and Bozeman Health announced a ground service partnership to provide transport services to Bozeman Health patients.

At the 2021 Air Medical Transport Conference, LFN was awarded the "Program of the Year" award by the Association of Air Medical Services for the second time.

In December 2021, LFN entered into a strategic alliance with Life Link III, which is an air medical transport agency based in Minneapolis. The "alliance will bring the organizations together to collaborate on best practices, process improvement, quality initiatives, and safety, all with a focus on the patients and communities they serve."

In July 2022, Ben Clayton was announced as the new CEO of LFN. Prior to becoming CEO, Clayon served as interim CEO and COO, as well as a variety of operational and safety leadership roles.

At the 2022 Air Medical Transport Conference, LFN's Neonatal & Pediatric Transport team was awarded the "Neonatal & Pediatric Transport Award of Excellence" by the Association of Air Medical Service.

In September 2023, LFN announced that it would further expand its ground operations by partnering with Samaritan Health Services in Lincoln County, Oregon to provide BLS and ALS inter-facility transports.

=== Fleet and equipment ===
As of 2023, Life Flight Network has a combined fleet of medical helicopters, fixed-wing aircraft, and ground ambulances.

Their current aircraft fleet includes:

- AgustaWestland AW119 Koala
- Eurocopter EC135
- Bell 429
- Bell 407
- Pilatus PC-12

Previous aircraft fleet includes:

- Cessna Citation CJ4
- AgustaWestland AW109

=== Crew ===
Each medical flight typically includes a Flight Nurse, Flight Paramedic, and Pilot. The neonatal-pediatric specialty team consists of a neonatal nurse and respiratory therapist.

=== Ownership and funding ===
The consortium of owner hospital systems includes Oregon Health & Science University, Legacy Emanuel Medical Center, Saint Alphonsus Regional Medical Center, and Providence Health & Services.

Life Flight is supported by annual membership fees and other sources of revenue.
