= Legacy Mount Hood Medical Center =

- Legacy Health System
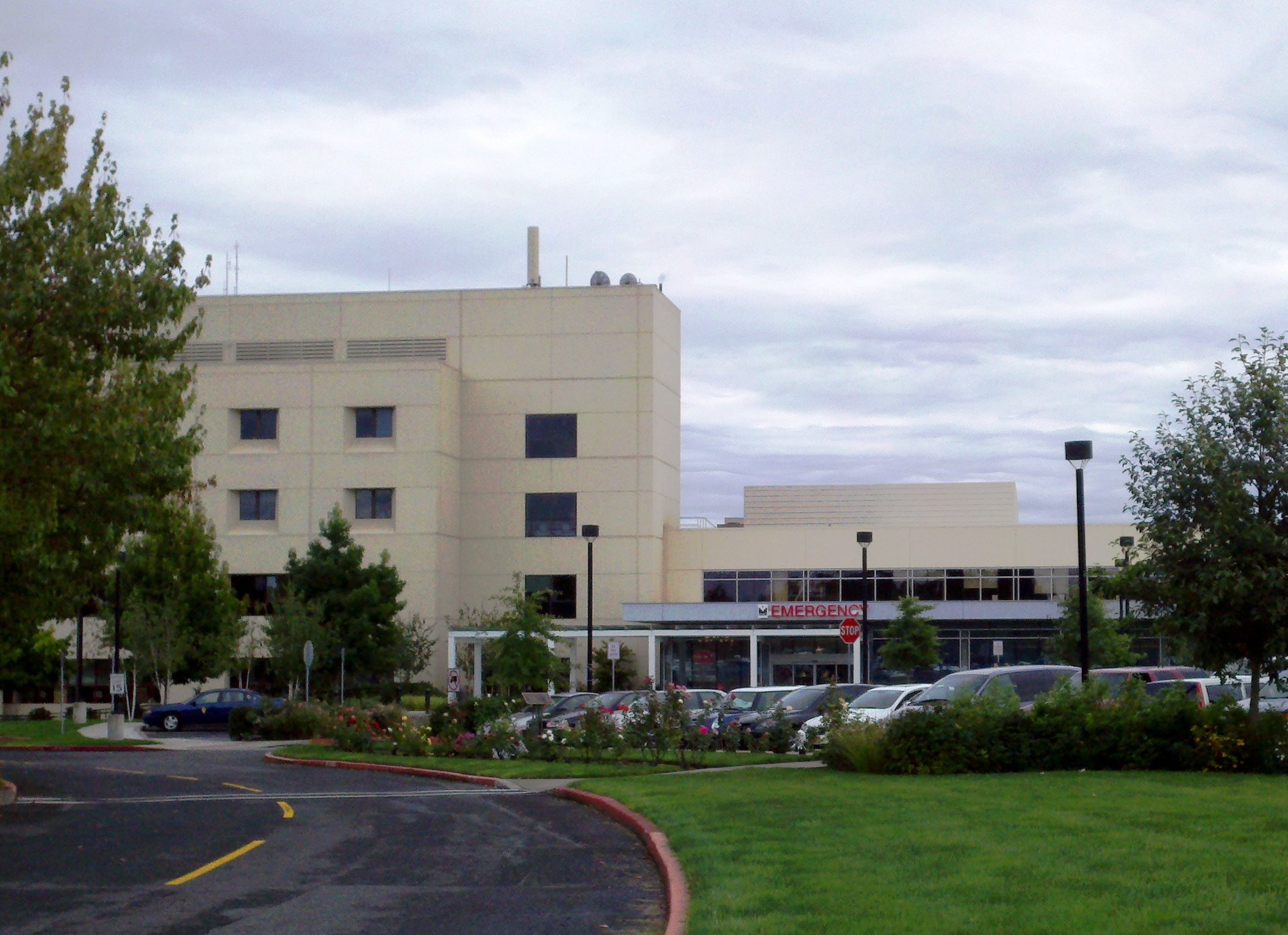

Geography
- Location: Gresham, Oregon, United States
- Coordinates: 45.5175°N 122.4073°W

Organization
- Care system: Private, non-profit
- Type: General medical and surgical

Services
- Emergency department: yes
- Beds: 115 (licensed)

History
- Founded: 1959

Links
- Website: www.legacyhealth.org/locations/hospitals/legacy-mount-hood-medical-center
- Lists: Hospitals in Oregon

Legacy Mount Hood Medical Center is a hospital in Gresham in the U.S. state of Oregon. Established in 1959, the 115-bed facility in the Portland metropolitan area is owned by the nonprofit Legacy Health. Originally a for-profit hospital, it moved to its current campus in 1984.

== History ==
Gresham General Hospital opened in July 1959 in downtown Gresham at a former nursing home that opened in 1934. Gresham General was a private, for-profit facility owned by Ben F. Doerksen and his wife built as a 52-bed facility for a cost of $500,000. Metropolitan Hospitals, parent company for Emanuel Hospital, purchased the hospital in 1971 and renamed it as Gresham Community Hospital, and by 1973 it had grown to a 113-bed facility. Earlier in 1971 Emanuel and several other hospitals joined to form Metropolitan Hospitals, which in 1989 became Legacy Health through another merger. In November 1984, Gresham's hospital moved to its current location on Southeast Stark Street in 1984, when it was renamed as Mount Hood Medical Center. The new $15.6 million facility was five stories and had 107 beds.

Construction on a second medical office building on the campus started in 1998. In 2001, the hospital added a permanent MRI machine, replacing a mobile unit that had previously been used. The next year the imaging department completed an expansion that doubled the size and also added a CAT scan machine. In 2003, Mount Hood Medical Center started construction on a $3 million expansion of the maternity department. The hospital opened an expanded 29-bed, 20,000-square-foot (1,900 m^{2}) emergency department in 2009.

== Operations ==
Legacy Mount Hood Medical Center has 115 licensed beds, but only operates 91 of them.

The hospital serves the eastern portions of Multnomah County in the Portland area.

Part of Legacy Health, the state of Oregon classifies the hospital as a DRG hospital.

Services at the facility include emergency services, maternity, surgery, radiology, breast health, cardiac rehabilitation, and orthopedic services.

For 2013, the hospital had a total of 5,848 discharges, with 20,493 patient days, and 41,501 emergency department visits, plus 93,254 outpatient days. Also that year were 1,027 births and 1,526 inpatient surgeries. In 2013 Mount Hood Medical Center had $319,752,501 in gross patient revenues, provided $25,853,578 in charity care, had $110,376,379 total in operating expenses, and an income of $2,030,716.

In March 2023 the hospital attempted to shut down its Family Birth Center by sending a waiver to the state health authority requesting they not be required to provide maternity services. This request was denied by the Oregon Health Authority in the same month.
