= Oregon Health & Science University Hospital =

- Oregon Health & Science University

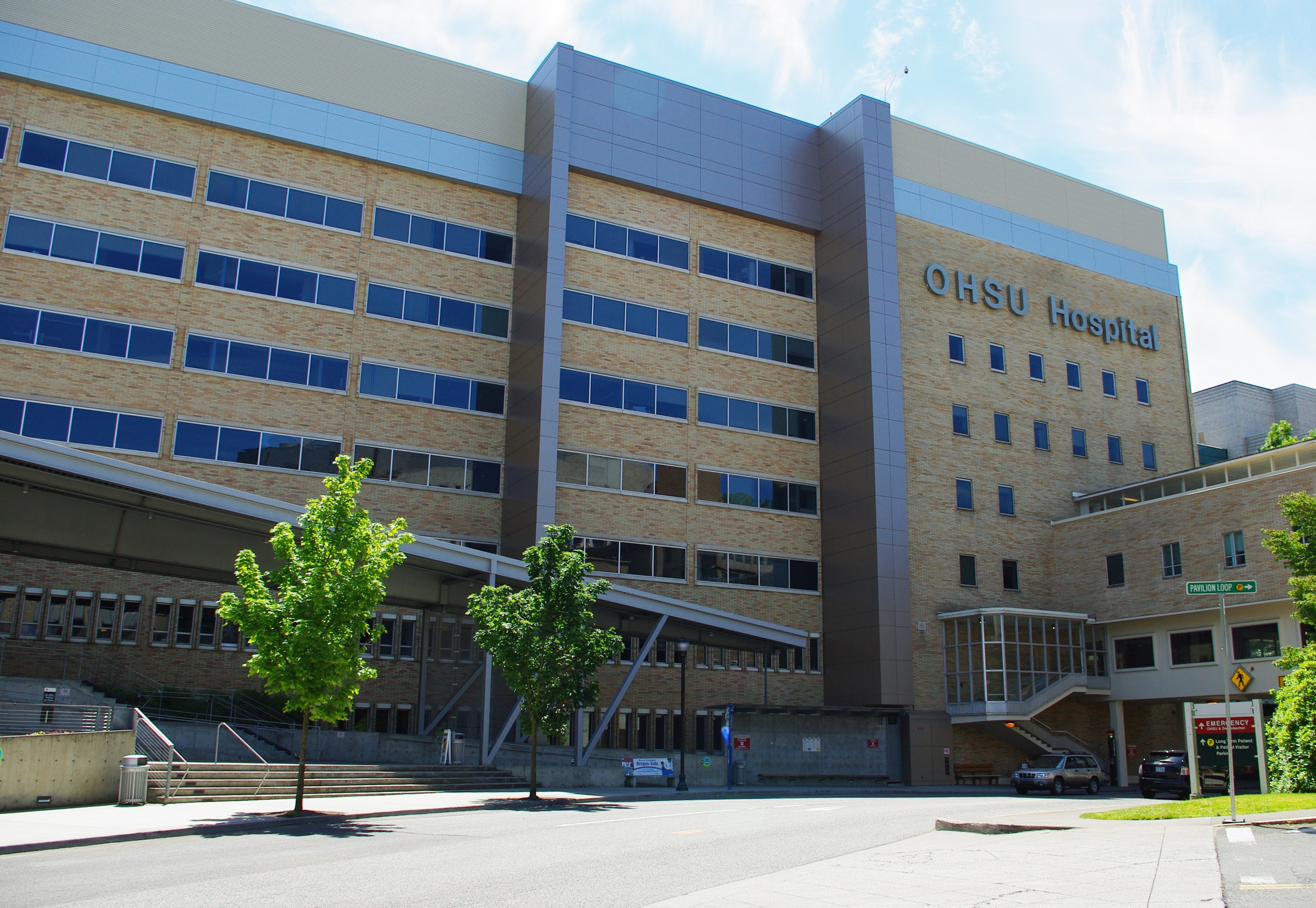
- Front of the main building

- Location within Portland, Oregon

Geography
- Location: Portland, Multnomah County, Oregon, United States
- Coordinates: 45.4992°N 122.685°W

Organization
- Care system: Public
- Type: Teaching

Services
- Emergency department: Level I trauma center
- Beds: 576

Links
- Website: OHSU Hospital
- Lists: Hospitals in Oregon

Oregon Health & Science University Hospital (OHSU Hospital) is a 576-bed teaching hospital, biomedical research facility, and Level I trauma center located on the campus of Oregon Health & Science University (OHSU) in Portland in the U.S. state of Oregon. Located on OHSU's Marquam Hill campus south of Downtown Portland, the hospital is adjacent to Doernbecher Children's Hospital and a Shriners Hospital for Children. OHSU Hospital is one of only two Level I trauma centers in Oregon.

== History ==
In 1887, a state medical school was chartered by the University of Oregon that would later become OHSU. During the 20th century, various academic institutions began offering nursing, dental, and public health education for the first time in Portland. Meanwhile, institutions emerged to offer medical services to disabled children and the indigent. These institutions and academic programs would later merge to form OHSU.

In 1974, these hospitals, schools, and academic programs were brought together to form the new University of Oregon Health Sciences Center, and became the state of Oregon's only academic medical center. It was renamed Oregon Health Sciences University in 1981. 1981 was also the year that OHSU was designated a Level 1 trauma center: one of only two in the state of Oregon.

In 1995, OHSU became a public corporation separate from the Oregon State System of Higher Education. Dispensing with the Board of Higher Education as the governing body of the institution, OHSU adopted a board of directors. The governor nominates members of the OHSU Board of Directors; they are then approved by the Oregon Senate.

In August 2025, OHSU's surgeon Ashok Muralidaran installed a prosthetic heart valve upside down, leading to near death of a girl. This was discovered during a new surgical intervention at Seattle Children's Hospital. In June 2026, the girl's parents have filed a $17 million lawsuit against OHSU and Muralidaran for medical negligence.

== Rankings ==
In 2015–2016, OHSU hospital was ranked #19 nationally for its ear, nose, and throat specialties, #36 for its geriatric medicine specialty, and #37 nationally for its cancer specialty.

== Accreditation ==
Oregon Health & Science University Hospital is accredited by Det Norske Veritas (DNV).

== See also ==
- Legacy Emanuel Medical Center
- Oregon Health & Science University Emergency Heliport
- OHSU Health Hillsboro Medical Center
- Providence Portland Medical Center
- Providence St. Vincent Medical Center
