= Samaritan Health Services =

Oregon-based nonprofit health care system

- Predecessor: Samaritan Inc. (Corvallis) (1948)
- Formation: 1997, 1999, 2001, 2002
- Merger of: Mid-Valley Healthcare (Lebanon) (1997), Samaritan Inc. (Corvallis) (1997), FirstCare Health (Albany) (1999), North Lincoln Health District (Lincoln City) (2001), Pacific Communities Health (Newport) (2002).
- Type: Non-profit organization
- Legal status: Company
- Headquarters: Corvallis, Oregon, U.S.
- Region served: Willamette Valley, Central Oregon Coast
- Services: Healthcare
- Key people: Doug Boysen, System CEO; Robert Turngren, MD, Chief Medical Officer
- Staff: 6,000 staff/ 620 physicians (2024)
- Volunteers: 750 (2022)
- Website: www.samhealth.org

The Samaritan Health Services (SHS) is a non-profit, integrated delivery healthcare system consisting of five hospitals, over 110 physician clinics, and multiple health insurance plans in Oregon and is headquartered in Corvallis, Oregon. As of 2022 it is one of the top 10 largest non-profit employers in the State of Oregon with nearly 7,000 employees and volunteers.

== History ==
The Corvallis-based nonprofit was founded in 1997 when Mid-Valley Healthcare in Lebanon and Samaritan Inc. of Corvallis merged in an effort to more efficiently serve their communities.

Samaritan Inc. began in 1948 when the Episcopal Church in Western Oregon, enabled the Corvallis General Hospital's reorganization as a not-for-profit facility.

Over the years other organizations have joined Samaritan Health, such as FirstCare Health (Albany) in 1999, and the North Lincoln Health District (Lincoln City) in 2001 and Pacific Communities Health (Newport) in 2002.

In 2025, Washington-based MultiCare Health System announced its intention to acquire Samaritan Health Services.

== Operations ==
SHS operates five hospitals and has over six hundred employed providers in Oregon. The largest hospitals are two Acute Care Hospitals in Corvallis and Albany, and three Critical Access Hospitals (CAHs) in Lebanon, Newport, and Lincoln City.

SHS operates 7 Urgent Care Centers in Newport, Lebanon, North Albany, South Albany, Corvallis, Brownsville and Sweet Home, 3 Express Care Clinics Lincoln City, Albany and Corvallis and over 100 physician clinics throughout the Willamette Valley and Central Oregon Coast.

SHS is partnered with the InterCommunity Health Network (IHN) Coordinated Care Organization (CCO), to unify health services and systems for the Oregon Health Plan (Medicaid) members in Benton, Lincoln, and Linn Counties. There are also over 110 specialty clinics operating within the SHS Network.

In 2011, Samaritan Health Services partnered with Western University of Health Sciences to start the College of Osteopathic Medicine of the Pacific, Northwest (COMP-NorthWest) on Samaritan's 54-acre 'Health Science Campus' in Lebanon, the first Oregon medical school to open in more than 100 years.

== Hospitals ==
SHS oversees the operations of five Oregon hospitals:

- Good Samaritan Regional Medical Center is a 188-bed medical facility in Corvallis, Oregon. The only hospital in the city, it is a level II trauma center, one of only 5 in the State, and serves the Linn, Benton, and Lincoln County area. I
- Samaritan Albany General Hospital is a 79-bed medical facility in Albany, Oregon. Services include a level III trauma center, as well as the first open magnetic resonance imaging facility in the middle Willamette Valley.
- Samaritan Lebanon Community Hospital is a 25-bed critical access care and Level IV trauma facility in Lebanon, Oregon. It provides services to eastern Linn County.
- Samaritan North Lincoln Hospital is a 25-bed critical access hospital and Level IV trauma center. It is located in the coastal town of Lincoln City, Oregon. This hospital serves the residents and visitors of Lincoln County.
- Samaritan Pacific Communities Hospital is a 25-bed acute care medical facility in Newport, Oregon. Services include a level IV trauma center.

=== Good Samaritan Regional Medical Center ===
Good Samaritan Regional Medical Center is a 188-bed medical facility located on a 84-acres in North Corvallis, Oregon. The only hospital in the city, it is a level II trauma center, and serves the Linn, Benton, and Lincoln County area. It is one of only 5 level II trauma centers in the State of Oregon. It was established as Corvallis General Hospital in 1913. The Episcopal Church in Western Oregon, enabled the hospital's reorganization as a not-for-profit facility in 1948. More than 2,669 employees and over 200 volunteers support its operations and the SHS mission of "building healthier communities together". During 2022, GSRMC served 7,926 inpatients, had 31,870 emergency department visits, performed 9,904 surgeries and delivered 950 babies. In addition, GSRMC performed 115,454 imaging procedures.

==== Heliport ====
The Good Samaritan Regional Medical Center Hospital Heliport is located at the hospital.

=== Samaritan Albany General Hospital ===
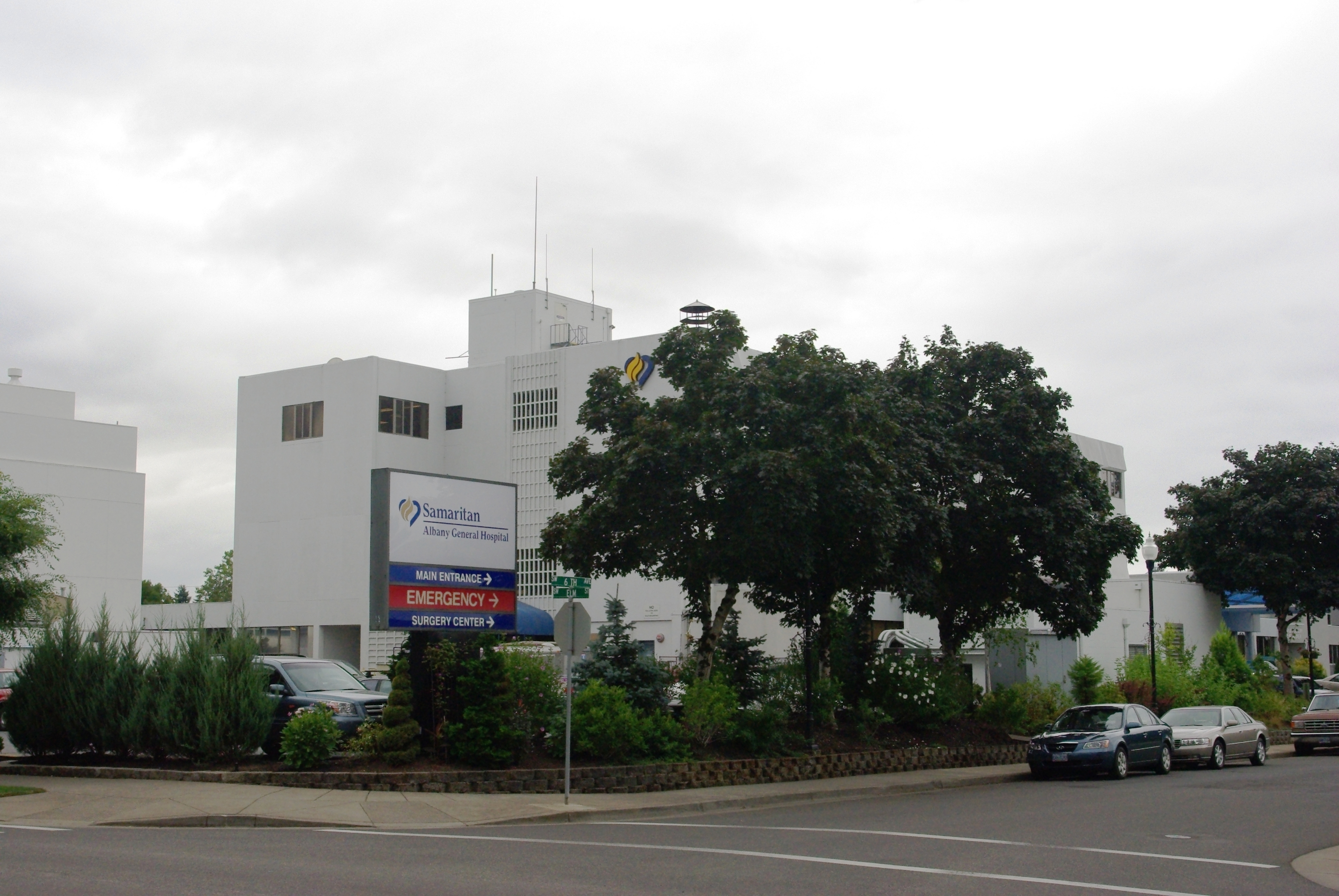
Main building of Albany General Hospital

Samaritan Albany General Hospital (44.63186°N 123.11632°W) is a 79-bed medical facility in Albany, Oregon. Services include a level III trauma center, as well as the first open magnetic resonance imaging facility in the middle Willamette Valley. Providing 7 medical specialties and care to area residents since 1924, 'Albany General' celebrated their 100th anniversary in 2024. Albany General Hospital employees a staff of 1,372 with 200 volunteers as of 2022. During 2022, AGH served 2,473 inpatients, had 23,068 emergency department visits, performed 4,448 surgeries and delivered 415 babies. In addition, AGH performed 80,993 imaging procedures.

It is accredited by Det Norske Veritas (DNV).

=== Samaritan Lebanon Community Hospital ===
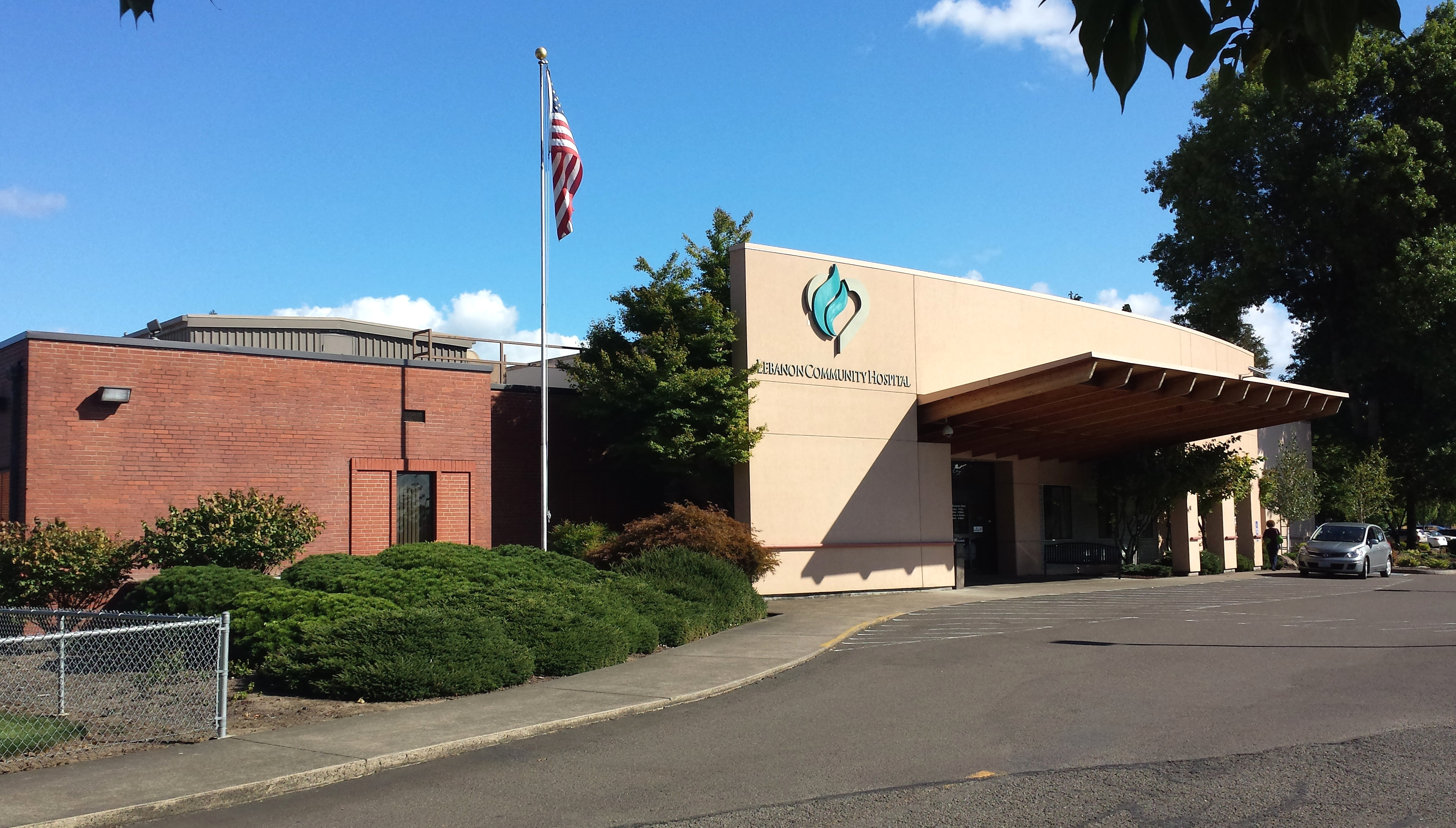
Lebanon Community Hospital

Samaritan Lebanon Community Hospital (44.5511°N 122.9076°W) is a 25-bed critical access level IV trauma center facility at 525 N. Santiam Hwy, Lebanon, Oregon, United States. It provides services to Lebanon and eastern Linn County since 1917. Lebanon Community Hospital employees a staff of 1,044 with 150 volunteers as of 2022. During 2022, LCH served 1,389 inpatients, had 21,768 emergency department visits, performed 2,347 surgeries, and delivered 255 babies. In addition, LCH performed 62,958 imaging procedures.

This facility is accredited by the Det Norske Veritas (DNV).

==== Heliport ====
The Lebanon Community Hospital Heliport is located at the hospital.

=== Samaritan Pacific Communities Hospital ===
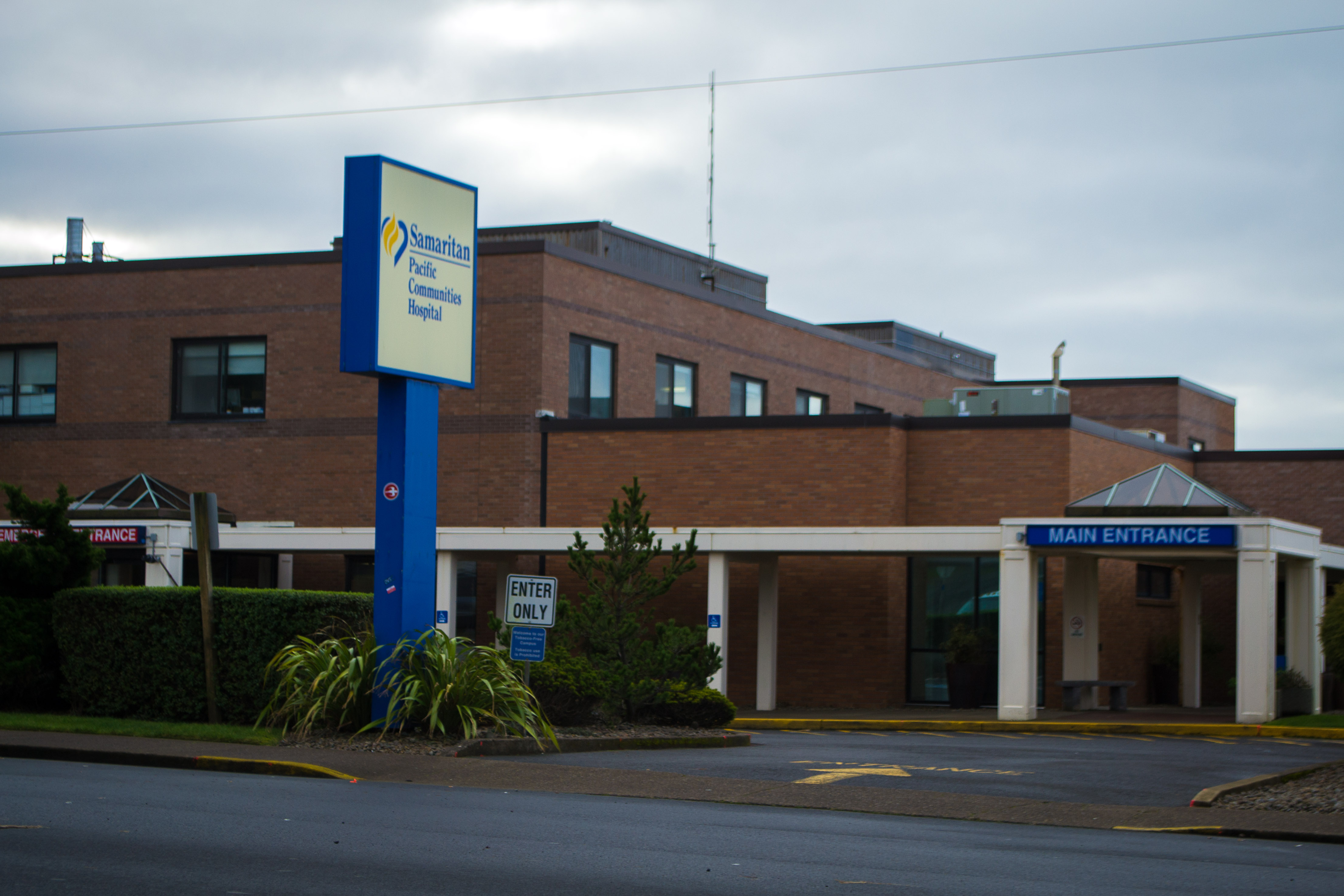
Pacific Communities Hospital

Samaritan Pacific Communities Hospital (44.6291°N 124.0590°W) is a 25-bed acute care medical facility at 930 SW Abbey Newport, Oregon, United States. Services include 18 medical specialties and a level IV trauma center.

The hospital was built in 1952 as a 17-bed acute care facility. Since then, it has been remodeled and expanded to meet the growing needs of the community. Currently, the hospital is a 25-bed critical access hospital, with 589 employees, over 120 of whom are nurses, and 150 volunteers. During 2022, SPHS served 1,274 inpatients, had 17,097 emergency department visits, performed 3,507 surgeries, and delivered 158 babies.

It is accredited by the Joint Commission on Accreditation of Health Care Organizations (JCAHO).

==== Heliport ====
The Pacific Communities Hospital Heliport is located at the hospital.

=== Samaritan North Lincoln Hospital ===
Samaritan North Lincoln Hospital is a 25-bed critical access hospital and level IV trauma center. It is located in the coastal town of Lincoln City, Oregon. Since 1968 this hospital serves the residents and visitors of Lincoln County. There are 18 medical specialties available at the hospital. During 2021, NLH served 870 inpatients, had 11,547 emergency department visits, performed 1,480 surgeries, and delivered 119 babies. In addition, NLH performed 29,144 imaging procedures. The new hospital's staff of 467 licensed professional staff includes more than 70 local physicians, physician assistants and nurse practitioners, over 150 volunteers as of 2022.

==== Heliport ====
The North Lincoln Hospital Heliport is located at the hospital.

== Urgent Care Centers and Clinics ==
SHS operates 7 Walk-in Clinic Urgent Care Centers. One each in Newport, Lebanon, North Albany, South Albany, Corvallis, Brownsville and Sweet Home. SHS also operates 3 'Express Care' Walk-in Clinics named SamCare Express in Lincoln City, Albany and Corvallis. The SamCare Express clinics offer same-day treatment of minor illnesses and injuries that are not life-threatening. There are also over 100 physician clinics throughout the Willamette Valley and Central Oregon Coast.

== InterCommunity Health Network ==
SHS is partnered with the InterCommunity Health Network (IHN) Coordinated Care Organization (CCO). IHN was formed in 2012 by local public, private, and non-profit partners to unify health services and systems for Oregon Health Plan (Medicaid) members in Benton, Lincoln, and Linn Counties and covers almost fifty five thousand individuals.

== COMP-NorthWest at the Health Sciences Campus ==
Plans for Oregon's first medical school in 100 years were announced as early as 2007, and in January 2008 it was announced the Western University of Health Sciences would partner with Samaritan Health Services to operate an Oregon branch on Samaritan's 54-acre 'Health Sciences Campus.' A year later, the planned school received accreditation by the American Osteopathic Association, and in June 2009 groundbreaking took place for the first building on the campus, a 55,000-square-foot (5,100 m^{2}) structure owned by Samaritan Health Services and leased to the school. That building was estimated to cost $15 million to build, and COMP Northwest signed a 20-year lease on the building. The new school was to be named the College of Osteopathic Medicine of the Pacific, Northwest (COMP-NW). The school opened its doors to its first incoming class of future doctors in 2011. As of the 2023–2024 academic school year there were 431 students enrolled with a faculty and administrative staff of 21 and an alumni base of 815 at the end of calendar year 2022.

== Governance ==
In 2018, Doug Boysen, former vice president and General Counsel, was appointed as CEO of the health system. Bob Turngren MD was hired a few months later as Chief Medical Officer.

== Awards ==
=== Quality Patient Care ===
In 2020 Healthgrades gave Good Samaritan Regional Medical Center and Samaritan Albany General Hospital the 'Outstanding Patient Experience Award.' In 2020 Healthgrades also recognized Samaritan Lebanon Community Hospital as one of the top 10 percent of hospitals nationwide to prevent poor outcomes in 14 serious patient event categories. Healthgreades also recognized Samaritan Albany General Hospital as a Five-Star Recipient for C-Section Delivery in 2020.

In 2020 Lebanon Community Hospitals Critical Care unit received silver level Beacon Award of Excellence from the American Association of Critical Care Nurses.

The American Heart Association gave Good Samaritan Regional Medical Center and Samaritan Albany General Hospital the 'Stroke Gold Plus Quality Achievement and Target: Stroke Honor Role Elite Award' in 2023 and 2024.The American Heart Association gave Samaritan Lebanon Community Hospital and Samaritan Pacific Communities Hospital the 'Get With The Guidelines Stroke Award' in 2023 and 2024.

=== Community Service ===
In 2018 SHS was listed as one of three finalists for the 2017 American Hospital Association Foster G. McGaw Prize for Excellence in Community Service, a national award that recognizes hospitals and hospital systems for improving the healthcare of their patients and communities.

=== Veteran/Military Friendly Employer ===
In 2024 SHS was named a 'Military Friendly Employer' for the 7th time in 8 years.

In 2021 SHS was named one of U.S. Veterans Magazine 'Best of the Best Top Veteran-Friendly Companies' for the sixth year in a row.

=== Healthiest Employer ===
In 2020, the Portland Business Journal listed SHS as the Healthiest Employer of Oregon, 5000 or More Employees, ranked by Healthiest Employers Index Score. This was the 12th time it received recognition in one of the categories for Healthiest Employer. The award was created to recognize organizations that are committed to creating a healthy workplace.

SHS was a 'Platinum Fit-Friendly Worksite' as designated by the American Heart Association in 2016.

SHS was named one of the '100 Healthiest Workplaces in America' in 2014 and 2023.

== See also ==
- List of hospitals in Oregon
- Lebanon Hospital Heliport
- College of Osteopathic Medicine of the Pacific, Northwest
