= Samaritan Hospital =

Samaritan Hospital or variant, may refer to:

- USS Samaritan (AH-10), WWII US Navy hospital ship
- Samaritan Health Services, Corvallis, Oregon, US; a hospital network
  - Samaritan Albany General Hospital, Albany, Oregon, US
  - Samaritan Lebanon Community Hospital, Lebanon, Oregon, US
  - Samaritan North Lincoln Hospital, Lincoln City, Oregon, US
  - Samaritan Pacific Communities Hospital, Newport, Oregon, US
- Samaritan Health System, Phoenix, Arizona, US; a hospital network
- Samaritan Hospital (Troy, New York), in upper New York (state)
- Samaritan Hospital for Women, London, England, UK; former hospital and Grade II listed building
- Royal Samaritan Hospital, Glasgow, Scotland, UK; former women's hospital
- Samaritan Hospital Nottingham (a.k.a. Nottingham Samaritan Hospital or Samaritan Hospital), Nottingham, England, UK; former women's hospital

== See also ==
- Samaritan's Touch Care Center, Highlands County, Florida, US; an outpatient clinic network
- Good Samaritan Hospital (disambiguation)
- Samaritan (disambiguation)
