= Church of the Good Samaritan =

Church of the Good Samaritan may refer to:

- Anglican Church of the Good Samaritan, St. John's, Newfoundland and Labrador, Canada
- Episcopal Church of the Good Samaritan, Corvallis, Oregon, United States

== See also ==
- The Good Samaritan (disambiguation)
