= CareOregon =

Healthcare nonprofit

CareOregon is Oregon’s largest managed care administrator of the Oregon Health Plan (OHP), the state’s Medicaid program with about 500,000 members as of January 2026. Doing business as Columbia Pacific CCO, Jackson Care Connect and a partner in Health Share of Oregon, CareOregon operates in seven counties.

CareOregon is involved in five broad areas of health care: health insurance for Medicaid enrollees (including a dental plan); health insurance for those who are eligible for both Medicaid and Medicare due to a combination of age, disability or income; home-based care; research-based health care quality improvement and reform, and collaborative process improvement.

CareOregon has built a network of multidisciplinary health care practitioners, per terms detailed in state contracts. The length of the state contract, in partnership with Health Share, is five years, with an option for amendments each year.

The Oregon Health Plan covers eligible medical, dental and behavioral health (mental health care and substance use treatment) services. In the Oregon Health Authority’s model, CareOregon is responsible for coordinating its members’ care, which includes communication among primary and specialty providers, social service agencies and community-based organizations, and providing tools for culturally and linguistically appropriate care.

Housecall Providers, a subsidiary organized in 2017, provides home-based primary, palliative and hospice care services.

CareOregon and its subsidiaries are also obligated to provide non-emergency medical transportation (NEMT) options to members for care covered by the Oregon Health Plan.

CareOregon has had a handful of data breaches between 2022 and 2025 that caused protected health information of thousands of members to be seen by unauthorized parties.

== Operations ==
Working largely with federally qualified health centers (FQHCs), including county health departments, migrant health clinics and other entities, CareOregon emphasizes primary and preventive care for its child and adult members. It is certified by the state Office of Medical Assistance Programs (OMAP).

As of 2020 and the Oregon Health Authority’s revised 5-year Medicaid contracts, CareOregon also manages behavioral health (previously handled by county health departments), oral health, and non-emergency medical transportation (NEMT) benefits for Health Share of Oregon clients in the Portland tri-county area.

== Members ==
As of January 2026, CareOregon administered various managed health care services and broader support to about 500,000 Oregonians in locally focused coordinated care organizations and its Medicare Advantage plan.

Statewide, enrollment in Oregon Health Plan as of December 2023 was more than 1.5 million.

== History ==
The nonprofit group health plan was founded “in 1993 by three safety-net providers – Multnomah County Health Department, the Oregon Primary Care Association, and [then-] Oregon Health Sciences University – shortly before Oregon received a Medicaid waiver that enabled the state to expand the number of low-income residents it covered.” After months of planning, CareOregon began operations with 10,000 clients on Feb. 1, 1994, the same day the Medicaid portion of the Oregon Health Plan enrolled its first Medicaid members.

The timing was intentional. CareOregon was formed with the stated purpose of being a committed, stabilizing force for the Oregon Health Plan, an experiment in health care reform. From its start, CareOregon viewed “managed care” unconventionally, focusing on managing its complex members to improved health, while also functioning as a payor.

Its April 1994 vision statement, included in “CareOregon: The Early Years” (n.d.) held that “CareOregon collaborators are committed to building a health plan that is grounded in the community, is responsive to culturally diverse populations and is a model for facilitating health care for all Oregon residents. . .On April 1, 1997, CareOregon, Inc. spun off from Multnomah County and became a fully independent non-profit organization.”

CareOregon’s origins in county public health oriented the company to recognizing and responding to socioeconomic influences on health. As noted in its 2021 financial report, “CareOregon’s mission is to inspire and partner to create quality and equity in individual and community health. CareOregon’s vision is healthy communities for all individuals, regardless of income or social circumstances.”

== Data breaches ==
CareOregon has had a handful of data breaches that released protected health information to unauthorized parties.

In January 2022, CareOregon accidentally released protected health information of 10,467 members by accidentally sending out email attachments containing private information to a consultant. In August of the same year, 5,500 CareOregon member data was again leaked due to a data breach.

In October 2025, protected health information including full name, date of birth, insurance ID number and primary care physician name of 5,273 members have been accessed by unauthorized personnel.

In March 2026, same information as the October 2025 incident relating to members were accessed by unauthorized personnel.

== Coordinated care organizations ==
In 2010-2012 – after the U.S. Congress expanded Medicaid eligibility as part of the Affordable Care Act, and the Oregon Legislature approved a shift to coordinated care organizations – CareOregon helped form and administer five of the state’s 15 original CCOs. (Varying sources put the initial number of CCOs at 15 and 16.) The move by Oregon was seen as “a significant transformation of its Medicaid program.”

Coordinated care organizations’ emphasis on primary and preventive care mirrors much of CareOregon’s longtime approach. In 2006, at a U.S. Senate roundtable before the Special Committee on Aging, then-CareOregon President & CEO David Ford stated, “It is not the care that people receive that is driving the cost of health care; it is the care that they don’t receive.”

== Lines of business ==
CareOregon refers to itself as “the CareOregon family” and is the umbrella entity for several lines of business.

The parent wholly or partially operates three of the Oregon Health Plan’s 16 coordinated care organizations, spanning seven of Oregon’s 36 counties: Columbia Pacific CCO, Jackson Care Connect and Health Share of Oregon. CareOregon formed them in spring 2012, the year that Oregon rolled out CCOs as a new approach to Medicaid.

CareOregon was a founding partner and funder of Health Share, a nonprofit coordinated care organization that is a partnership of 11 health and social service organizations, including CareOregon. Health Share covers three counties in the Portland area. Of its five health care partners, CareOregon “operates the largest plan under Health Share of Oregon,” the Portland Business Journal wrote in 2019. CareOregon differentiates its work within Health Share as “CareOregon Metro.”

Additional lines of business are CareOregon Dental, which offers dental care to Oregon Health Plan clients in four counties (the Oregon Health Authority required coordinated care organizations to offer dental benefits beginning in 2014); Housecall Providers, a home-based hospice, palliative care and primary care service in the Portland area and CareOregon subsidiary since 2017; and Tribal care coordination for self-identified American Indians and Alaska Natives who are covered by the Oregon Health Plan on a fee-for-service basis.

In 2005, CareOregon formed Health Plan of CareOregon, Inc, which began operations Jan. 1, 2006 as a Special Needs Medicare Advantage Drug Plan (MA-PD plan). It is a nonprofit public benefit corporation. As CareOregon Advantage, it mainly enrolls members who are eligible for both Medicaid and Medicare. Until Dec. 31, 2018, CareOregon also offered a commercial Medicare Advantage plan.

== Funding ==
State and federal monies fund the Oregon Health Plan. The Oregon Health Authority contracts with coordinated care organizations, paying them a per-member-per-month amount, to coordinate health care for enrollees in the Oregon Health Plan.

CareOregon is a fully capitated health plan. In exchange for the monthly per-member fee, CareOregon holds the full financial risk for its members’ actual health care expenses.

In 2022, the latest publicly posted audited financial report, the company’s total revenues were $2.36 billion. Total operating expenses were $2.28 billion.

== Governance ==
CareOregon, Columbia Pacific CCO and Jackson Care Connect officers are overseen by a largely local board of directors. Directors are not compensated. Member advisory boards or councils provide input to each coordinated care organization. In addition, Jackson Care Connect has a Youth Advisory Council.

== Leadership ==
2016–present: Eric C. Hunter, President and CEO

== Financial downturns ==
In 2003, CareOregon was on the edge of bankruptcy, “prompted in part by declining state reimbursements (that), ‘forced us to confront who are we and what is our core value in the world,’ said David Labby, M.D., Ph.D., CareOregon’s [then] medical director.”

The situation led to layoffs, new leadership, a reorganization, and efforts to improve quality, performance and population health as both a business and health strategy. These efforts included the CareSupport and Primary Care Renewal programs.

In 2015-2018, CareOregon experienced losses that its executives expected to exceed $96 million by the end of 2018. The company was stabilized by its large reserves and revised state contracts.

Also in 2018, CareOregon Metro assumed care for about 80,000 of the 100,000 clients of Family Care, a coordinated care organization that closed its Medicaid plan Dec. 31, 2017.

The 80,000 new members represented a 40 percent expansion of CareOregon’s enrollment in less than six weeks.

== Providence affiliation ==
In August 2019, CareOregon announced its intention to affiliate with Providence Plan Partners, a subsidiary of Providence St. Joseph Health and fellow founding member of the Health Share coordinated care organization.

In early 2020, the CareOregon president and CEO wrote in an op-ed that in joining Providence, CareOregon would retain its secular and nonprofit status and strengthen its long-term financial position, given “a shifting funding landscape and increased community needs on the horizon.”

A weekly alternative newspaper, Willamette Week, reported immediate criticisms of the plan.

In spring 2020, four federal elected officials, nonprofit leaders and others expressed concerns to CareOregon leaders that its coverage of certain reproductive health and gender-identity services, and medical aid in dying, would, in time, change under a Catholic institution.

By mid-May 2020, CareOregon and Providence Plan Partners had ended their discussions to affiliate.

== Social determinants of health ==
When Oregon adopted coordinated care organizations, CareOregon increased its attention on non-medical factors that affect health, known as social determinants of health. One social determinant, housing insecurity, became a particular focus, most notably with the Housing is Health initiative.

In 2016, CareOregon gave $4 million of a combined $21.5 million donation, joining five Portland hospitals to help fund three housing projects, including one with onsite treatment for mental illness and substance use disorder. The move was “hailed by national housing advocates as the largest private investment of its kind in the nation,” wrote the Associated Press.

CareOregon has also tried various strategies to take health care outside of typical clinical settings, such as offering nutritious foods to eligible members, a screening study in which colorectal cancer screening kits were mailed to Medicaid and Medicare members’ homes.

== Community benefit organization ==
CareOregon has had an increasing interest in a role as a community benefit organization, which is also an expectation of the Oregon Health Authority. CareOregon awards grants to community-based organizations that address various social determinants of health beyond housing, including hunger, education, culturally and linguistically responsive care, disabilities, mental health and drug treatment services, staff support, and trauma-informed care. A major grant announced in 2021 was $7.5 million to “recruit and retain mental health and substance use treatment providers.”

== Trauma-informed care ==
CareOregon has specialized staff who use principles of trauma-informed care to develop relationships with members who have been identified as high acuity and high cost.

CareOregon partnered in the past with the city of Portland, with a $70,000 grant to shore up the systems supporting those in mental health and drug-related crises or non-medically urgent 911 calls. Columbia Pacific CCO created a $400,000 fund in 2023 to help groups in two counties increase efforts to prevent adverse childhood experiences and support trauma-informed services. Columbia Pacific also committed $594,000 to recruit and retain behavioral health providers.

== Sponsorships ==
On Nov. 29, 2021, CareOregon announced a 10-year, $2 million partnership with the Boys & Girls Club of the Portland Metropolitan Area. It focused efforts on the club in Rockwood, an eastern Multnomah County neighborhood that is home to a large share of families on the Oregon Health Plan. As part of the partnership, the facility was renamed the CareOregon Boys & Girls Club at Rockwood.

== Diversity, equity and inclusion ==
CareOregon’s early leaders built a staff to reflect the populations using its services. In 2003, according to the founding CEO, more than 30% of CareOregon staff were people of color. The company was recognized in 2021 by Modern Healthcare for its workforce diversity, including leadership.

During the COVID-19 pandemic, CareOregon put a greater emphasis on community justice and in March 2021 added an officer-level role for diversity, equity and inclusion.

For members, it supports programs to provide culturally specific care to improve health outcomes for immigrants, Tribal members and people of color.
