= North Albany (disambiguation) =

North Albany is the common name of the North Albany Football Club

North Albany may also refer to:

- North Albany, Albany, New York, a neighborhood in Albany, New York
- North Albany, Oregon, the Benton County district of Albany, Oregon
- North Albany Clubhouse, a clubhouse located in Albany County, Wyoming
- North Albany Senior High School, a public high school located in Albany, Western Australia
- North of Albany, a 2021 film directed by Marianne Farley
