= InterCommunity Health Network =

- Company type: Oregon Coordinated Care Organization
- Industry: Insurance
- Founded: 2012
- Headquarters: Oregon, USA
- Area served: Benton County, Oregon; Lincoln County, Oregon; Linn County, Oregon
- Website: ihntogether.org

InterCommunity Health Network (IHN) is an integrated care coordinated care organization (CCO) formed by Oregon in 2012 to allow for local and regional distribution and coordination of healthcare to segments of the state's population covered under the Oregon Health Plan. It was created, with the rest of the CCOs, through Oregon Senate Bill 1580.

Its approximately fifty-five thousand members are part of the Medicaid segment of the population of the Benton, Lincoln, and Linn counties and work with healthcare providers, hospitals, and local community groups to integrate healthcare services and contain cost increases through improved quality of care.

IHN is partnered with Samaritan Health Services, a non-profit healthcare organization consisting of five Oregon hospitals.
