= Good Samaritan Hospital =

Good Samaritan Hospital or Good Samaritan Medical Center may refer to:

== India ==
- Good Samaritan Hospital (Panamattom), Koprakalam, Panamattom, Kerala
- Good Samaritan Centre, Mutholath Nagar, Cherpunkal, Kottyam, Kerala

== Malta ==
- Good Samaritan Hospital (St. Paul's Bay)

== United States ==
Alphabetical by state, then city or town

- Banner - University Medical Center Phoenix (formerly Banner Good Samaritan Medical Center), Arizona
- Good Samaritan Hospital (Los Angeles), California
- Good Samaritan Hospital (San Jose), California
- Good Samaritan Medical Center (Lafayette, Colorado), operated by Intermountain Health
- Good Samaritan Hospital (St. Petersburg, Florida), now Orlando Health Bayfront Hospital
- Good Samaritan Medical Center (West Palm Beach, Florida)
- Advocate Good Samaritan Hospital, Downers Grove, Illinois
- Good Samaritan Hospital (Vincennes), Indiana
- Good Samaritan Hospital (Lexington), Kentucky, operated by UK HealthCare
- MedStar Good Samaritan Hospital, Baltimore, Maryland
- House of the Good Samaritan, a.k.a. Boston Good Samaritan Hospital, Massachusetts (closed 1973)
- Good Samaritan Medical Center (Brockton), Massachusetts
- Good Samaritan Hospital (Suffern), New York
- Good Samaritan University Hospital, West Islip, New York
- Good Samaritan Hospital (Charlotte), North Carolina (closed 1982; Bank of America Stadium is located on this site)
- TriHealth Good Samaritan Hospital, Cincinnati, Ohio
- Good Samaritan Hospital (Dayton), Ohio (closed 2018)
- Firelands Regional Medical Center, (successor to Good Samaritan Hospital), Sandusky, Ohio
- Good Samaritan Regional Medical Center (Oregon), Corvallis, Oregon
- Legacy Good Samaritan Medical Center, Portland, Oregon
- WellSpan Good Samaritan Hospital, Lebanon, Pennsylvania, a hospital in Pennsylvania
- Good Samaritan Hospital (Puyallup, Washington), operated by MultiCare Health System

== See also ==
- Samaritan Hospital (disambiguation)
- The Good Samaritan (disambiguation)
