= Samaritan (disambiguation) =

The Samaritans are an ethnoreligious group of the eastern Mediterranean region, originating from connection with ancient Samaria.

Samaritan may also refer to:

- The Parable of the Good Samaritan

== Samaritanism ==
- Samaritanism (Samaritan religion), the religion of Samaritans
  - Samaritan Pentateuch (Samaritan Torah), the Samaritan bible
  - Samaritan Temple, the church of Samaritans
    - Samaritan High Priest (kohen gadol) of the extant Samaritans

== Linguistics ==
- Samaritan (Unicode block), a block of Unicode characters for writing ancient Hebrew and Aramaic
- Samaritan source (symbol), a typographic symbol indicating original source written with Samaritan script
- Samaritan alphabet
- Samaritan Aramaic language
- Samaritan Hebrew language
  - Samaritan vocalization

== Arts, entertainment, and media ==
=== Fictional characters ===
- Samaritan, a superhero from the Astro City comic book
- Samaritan, an antagonistic artificial superintelligence in the television show Person of Interest

=== Other arts, entertainment, and media ===
- Samaritan Snare, a 1989 episode of Star Trek: The Next Generation
- Samaritan (novel) is a 2003 novel by Richard Price
- Samaritan demo, a 2011 software demonstration of the Unreal Engine
- The Samaritan, a 2012 film starring Samuel L. Jackson also known as Fury
- Samaritan (film), a 2022 American superhero film

== Organizations ==
- Samaritans (charity) (formerly The Samaritans), a British-based registered charity aimed at providing emotional support to anyone in distress or at risk of suicide

- Samaritan's Purse, a non-denominational evangelical Christian humanitarian organization
- The Samaritan Befrienders Hong Kong, a non-government organization providing similar counseling services in Hong Kong
- Samaritans of Singapore, a non-government organization providing similar counseling services in Singapore

- Good Samaritan Industries, a UnitingCare Australia church agency in Western Australia, which helps find employment for people with disabilities
- Samaritan Foundation Cult, a cult associated with the death of filmmaker Allen Ross

== Transportation ==
- Samaritan Aviation, an airline of Papua New Guinea
- FV104 Samaritan, an ambulance of the CVR(T) family of vehicles in service with the British Army and others
- Convair C-131 Samaritan, U.S. twin-engined military transport plane
- USS Samaritan, a U.S. Navy ship name
  - USS Samaritan (AH-10), a WWII U.S. Navy hospital ship

== Other uses ==
- Samaritan Catholic College, a secondary college in the Northern Suburb of Preston, Victoria, Australia

== See also ==
- The Good Samaritan (disambiguation)
- Bad Samaritans (disambiguation)
- Samaritan Hospital (disambiguation)
- Samaritan Christians
- Samiri (Islamic figure)
- Samaritani
