= The Good Samaritan =

Good Samaritan usually refers to the Parable of the Good Samaritan, a story in the Gospel of Luke that encourages people to help others who are in danger.

The phrases Good Samaritan and The Good Samaritan may also refer to:

== Arts, entertainment, and media ==
=== Art ===
- The Good Samaritan (Eastlake), an 1850 painting by Charles Lock Eastlake
- The Good Samaritan (Morot), a 1880 painting by Aimé Morot
- The Good Samaritan (sculpture), a 1936 sculpture by Georg Morin

=== Film ===
- The Good Samaritan (film), 2014 crime thriller
- Tora-san, the Good Samaritan (男はつらいよ 奮闘篇, Otoko wa Tsurai yo: Funtō hen), 1971 Japanese comedy film

=== Television ===
- "The Good Samaritan" (Agents of S.H.I.E.L.D.), an episode of the fourth season of Agents of S.H.I.E.L.D.
- The Good Samaritan (Hallmark), a 1954 episode of the Hallmark Hall of Fame
- "The Good Samaritan" (NCIS), NCIS episode
- "The Good Samaritan" (Seinfeld), an episode in the show's third season
- "The Good Samaritan" (The Blacklist), a 2014 episode from TV series The Blacklist

== Laws ==
- Bill Emerson Good Samaritan Act of 1996, a US law intended to encourage food donations
- Good Samaritan laws, several laws in different countries that offer legal protection to those who help others in distress

== Religious and social care organizations ==
- The Evangelical Lutheran Good Samaritan Society, a U.S.-based senior housing and nursing organization, now owned by Sanford Health
- Good Samaritan Society, a Canadian Lutheran social service care home organization
- Sisters of the Good Samaritan, a Roman Catholic congregation in Australia
- Anglican Church of the Good Samaritan, St. John's, Newfoundland and Labrador, Canada
- Episcopal Church of the Good Samaritan, Corvallis, Oregon, United States
- Good Samaritan Hospital (disambiguation), several hospitals
- Good Samaritan Children's Home, an orphanage in Ukraine

== Other uses ==
- Inn of the Good Samaritan (Khan al-Hatruri), an archeological site (caravanserai) located at the road between Jerusalem and Jericho
- Good Samaritan Catholic College

== See also ==
- Bad Samaritans (disambiguation)
- Samaritan (disambiguation)
- Good (disambiguation)
