= Samaritan North Lincoln Hospital =

- Samaritan Health Services
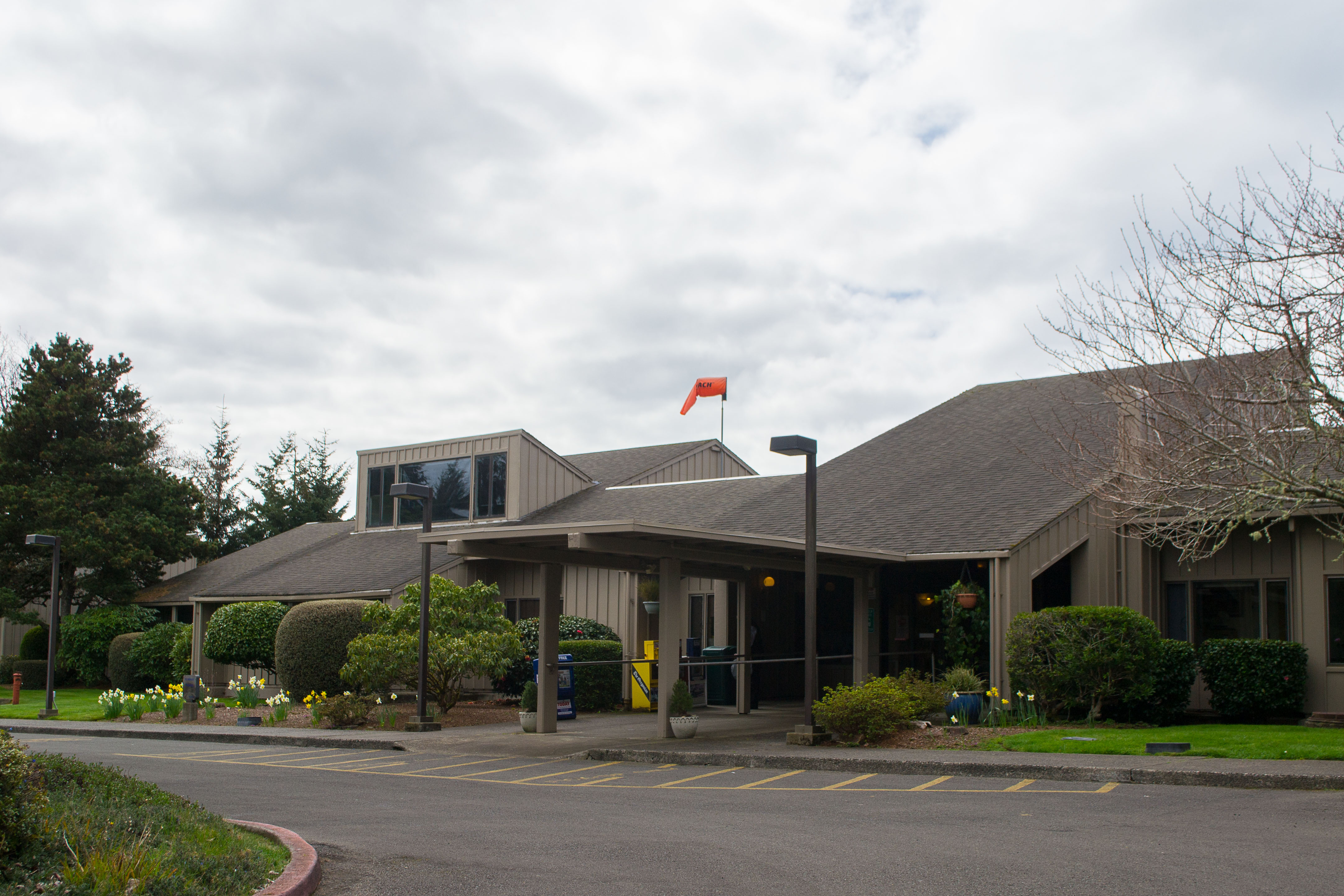

- Location within Oregon

Geography
- Location: 3043 NE 28th Street, Lincoln City, Oregon, United States
- Coordinates: 44.986128°N 123.995583°W

Organization
- Type: Community

Services
- Emergency department: Level IV trauma center
- Beds: 25

Helipads
- Helipad: (FAA LID: OR93)

History
- Founded: 1968

Links
- Website: www.samhealth.org/find-a-location/s/samaritan-north-lincoln-hospital/%20www.samhealth.org
- Lists: Hospitals in Oregon

Samaritan North Lincoln Hospital is a 25-bed Critical Access Hospital and level IV trauma center that was founded in 1968. It is located in the coastal town of Lincoln City, in the U.S. state of Oregon. This hospital serves the residents and visitors of Lincoln County.

== History ==
Since the 1930s, there had been interest in establishing a hospital in Lincoln City, Oregon, but it wasn't until the 1960s that these efforts gained widespread community support. In 1963, a hospital feasibility committee was organized. Its members helped to lay the groundwork for passage of a ballot measure in April 1965 to form a hospital taxing district. The district, then known as North Lincoln Hospital District and now known as the North Lincoln Health District, covers 115 square miles of north Lincoln County. With tax proceeds, federal grant money and the sale of general obligation bonds, the health district was prepared to begin construction of a hospital.

On September 23, 1967, Oregon Gov. Tom McCall presided at a formal groundbreaking ceremony on a nine-acre tract of land overlooking Devils Lake in the northeast corner of Lincoln City. The governor returned to the site to deliver the dedication speech on Oct. 13, 1968. The doors of the new hospital officially opened on Oct. 28, 1968, with 50 full-time staff members. Six patients were admitted on its first day and two babies were born there during its first week.

On February 29, 2000, the North Lincoln Health District and Samaritan Health Services entered into an interim management agreement. The parties then entered into a 30-year Healthcare Facilities Lease on January 1, 2001, in which Samaritan Health Services agreed to manage and operate the hospital and adjoining properties owned by the health district.

In the autumn of 2015, the health district and Samaritan Health Services agreed to a memorandum of understanding in which ownership of the district's hospital facilities and real properties totaling 12 acres would be transferred to Samaritan Health Services. In turn, Samaritan Health Services agreed to construct a new hospital on the existing campus within three years. The transfer of assets was legally completed on February 3, 2016.

In July 2018, construction began on a replacement hospital building, which is planned to open in early 2020. Samaritan Health Services selected Skanska USA Building and HGA Architects and Engineers as the design/build team responsible for planning, designing, and construction of the new Samaritan North Lincoln Hospital, which is being built directly east of the existing hospital building.

== Operations ==
The facility offers a wide range of inpatient and outpatient medical services including emergency services, general surgery, diagnostic imaging (radiology), laboratory testing, colonoscopy and upper endoscopies, pharmacy services, obstetrics and gynecology, respiratory therapy and diabetes education.

The hospital is a level IV trauma center and serves the entire county, plus portions of neighboring counties.

The hospital offers many digital imaging services onsite including MRI machine, a 160-slice CAT scanner, PET scan, echocardiography, DEXA bone density testing, 3-D digital mammography, 3-D ultrasound and digital X-ray imaging.

=== Outpatient services ===
The hospital campus has additional clinics and ancillary services. This includes outpatient medical and surgical clinics, an infusion center for oncology and non-oncology needs, anticoagulation services, wound & ostomy clinic, and home health & hospice services.

Physical rehabilitation services available include occupational, physical and speech therapy. Primary care is available with physicians trained in family medicine, internal medicine and pediatrics. Specialty clinicians offer cardiology and cardiac device management, mental health and psychiatry, nephrology, orthopedics, podiatry and urology.

== North Lincoln Hospital Foundation ==
The North Lincoln Hospital Foundation is a 501(c)(3) organization that raises private philanthropic support for Samaritan North Lincoln Hospital and to invest and manage these gifts to honor donors’ wishes. All funds raised are kept local to support the hospital. Since their inception in 1983, they have provided more than $2.9 million to purchase medical equipment for the hospital, enhance program services, provide financial support for patient and community wellness programs, and help low-income individuals obtain medical care, including the provision of medical assistance grants of over $1.65 million to north Lincoln County residents.

Medical equipment purchases in 2016 included $175,000 for a cardiac ultrasound machine and $19,000 for video laryngoscope glidescopes for use in the emergency department, surgical services and ICU. There were quality of life donations for hospice patients - funding for non-medical, life-enhancing support such as travel for family members, massages, and music. They also gave three $1,000 Mary Decker Scholarships awarded to students pursuing a health care career.

From 2017 to 2020, the foundation and community will aim to raise $7 Million for equipment needs of the replacement hospital building.

== Samaritan Health Services ==
Samaritan North Lincoln Hospital is one of five hospitals in the Samaritan Health Services system. The other four hospitals are Good Samaritan Regional Medical Center, Samaritan Albany General Hospital, Samaritan Lebanon Community Hospital, and Samaritan Pacific Communities Hospital.

== Accreditation ==
Samaritan North Lincoln Hospital is accredited by international accrediting agency Det Norske Veritas.

== See also ==
- List of hospitals in Oregon
- North Lincoln Hospital Heliport
