= Banner Health =

Nonprofit health system in six western U.S. states

- Type: Nonprofit organization
- Industry: Health Care
- Predecessors: Samaritan Health System; Lutheran Health Systems
- Founded: 1999; 27 years ago
- Headquarters: Phoenix Plaza; Phoenix, Arizona, USA
- Number of locations: 33 hospitals (2024)
- Areas served: Arizona, California, Colorado, Nebraska, Nevada, Wyoming
- Key people: Amy Perry, President & CEO
- Products: Health care services, emergency room services, medical group and primary care facilities
- Revenue: $14.1 billion (2023)
- Total assets: 6,298,332,280 United States dollar (2011)
- Number of employees: 55,000+ (2023)
- Website: www.bannerhealth.com
- Footnotes; Making health care easier, so life can be better. (Mission)

Banner Health is a nonprofit health system in the United States, based in Phoenix, Arizona. It operates 33 hospitals and several specialized facilities across 6 states. The health system is the largest employer in Arizona and one of the largest in the United States with over 55,000 employees.

The organization provides emergency and hospital care, hospice, long-term/home care, outpatient surgery, labs, rehabilitation services, pharmacies, and primary care. In 2024, it reports $14.1 billion in revenue for the previous year.

Banner Health was created in 1999 through a merger between Lutheran Health Systems, based in North Dakota, and Samaritan Health System, based in Phoenix, Arizona. In 2001, Banner sold its operations in Iowa, Kansas, Minnesota, New Mexico, North Dakota and South Dakota, and made its sole headquarters in Phoenix.

Banner also operates a Medicare Advantage insurance plan in the valley referred to as Banner Medicare Advantage and an AHCCCS (Medicaid) plan referred to as Banner University Family Care. Banner operates a joint venture with Aetna, Banner | Aetna, that provides employer-based insurance and marketplace insurance.

Banner Health has partnered with the University of Texas MD Anderson Cancer Center, one of the original three comprehensive cancer centers in the United States established by the National Cancer Act of 1971, and built a $90 million cancer center in Gilbert, Arizona.

== History ==
In 1999, two nonprofit entities Samaritan Health System (dating back to 1911) and Lutheran Health Systems (history dating back to 1938) merged, forming Banner Health. At the time the entity operated in 14 states and had around 22,000 employees.

In 2007, Banner closed the former Mesa Lutheran hospital and later converted it to office space at a cost of around $100 million.

In 2006 Banner Health launched a telemedicine program. The health system determined the telemonitoring saved 34,000 ICU days and close to 2,000 lives in 2013 based on APACHE II predicted length of stay and mortality rates.

In October 2006 Banner acquires the assets and staff, including 40 providers of Big Thompson Medical Medical Group in Loveland, Colorado.

In 2008, Banner Health selected Nextgen Healthcare as its partner for ambulatory EHR medical records at all of its outpatient facilities.

In October 2008, Banner acquired large specialty group "Arizona Medical Clinic" in the west valley and renamed this entity Banner Arizona Medical Clinic.

In August 2012, Banner embarked on a plan to rename and harmonize the names of its acquired medical clinics organized under Banner Medical Group. Clinics were renamed according to specialty across the entire system

In February 2014, Banner acquired Casa Grande Medical Center in Casa Grande, AZ

In June 2014, the University of Arizona Health Network (UAHN) and Banner Health launched a merger, pending Arizona Board of Regents approval to combine operations The merger finally took place in 2016. The new Banner division, Banner - University Medicine and its employed physician group, Banner - University Medical Group (BUMG) brought Banner Health into the forefront of academic medicine. As part of the deal, the former University of Arizona Medical Center and University of Arizona Medical Center - South Campus, in Tucson, AZ, were renamed Banner – University Medical Center Tucson and Banner – University Medical Center South, respectively. Banner Good Samaritan hospital in Phoenix was also renamed, to Banner – University Medical Center Phoenix, to reflect its new designation as the primary teaching hospital of the University of Arizona College of Medicine – Phoenix. To upgrade the aging infrastructure of all of these facilities, Banner Health pledged nearly US$1.5 billion to several major construction projects in Phoenix and Tucson.

In 2015, Banner relocated its headquarters from the Banner Good Samaritan Hospital campus (now known as Banner – University Medical Center) to a tower at Central Avenue and Thomas Road in Phoenix, Arizona. In the same year, it signed an agreement with Cerner to move all of its facilities including the clinics formerly on Nextgen to Cerner EHR. The move also includes staff sharing between Banner and Cerner to execute on the implementation.

In August 2016, Banner Health acquired the assets and staff of Urgent Care Extra's 32 Arizona urgent care facilities, hoping to grow the urgent care footprint to 50 clinics by 2017. Banner Health fell victim to a cyberattack and data breach that may have put the information of up to three million patients and employees at risk. This led to a class-action lawsuit which was settled in 2020. According to HIPAA Journal, this breach was the largest of any health care concern in 2016.

In 2017, Banner Health and Aetna announced a joint venture creating a new health insurance company, Banner|Aetna.

In April 2018, Banner submitted to an $18 million fine relating to billing and operational abnormalities relating to billing government programs for services In June 2018, the company completed the transition of the Tucson medical facilities conversion from Epic Systems EHR to the EHR used at their other entities, Cerner. The conversion was noted as challenging for the staff involved and cost approximately US$45 million.

In July 2020, Wyoming Medical Center agreed to join Banner Health.

In November 2020, Banner opened the newest hospital serving Chandler, Arizona. Banner Ocotillo Medical Center is the first new Banner hospital since 2010, when Banner Ironwood Medical Center opened in San Tan Valley.

== Locations ==
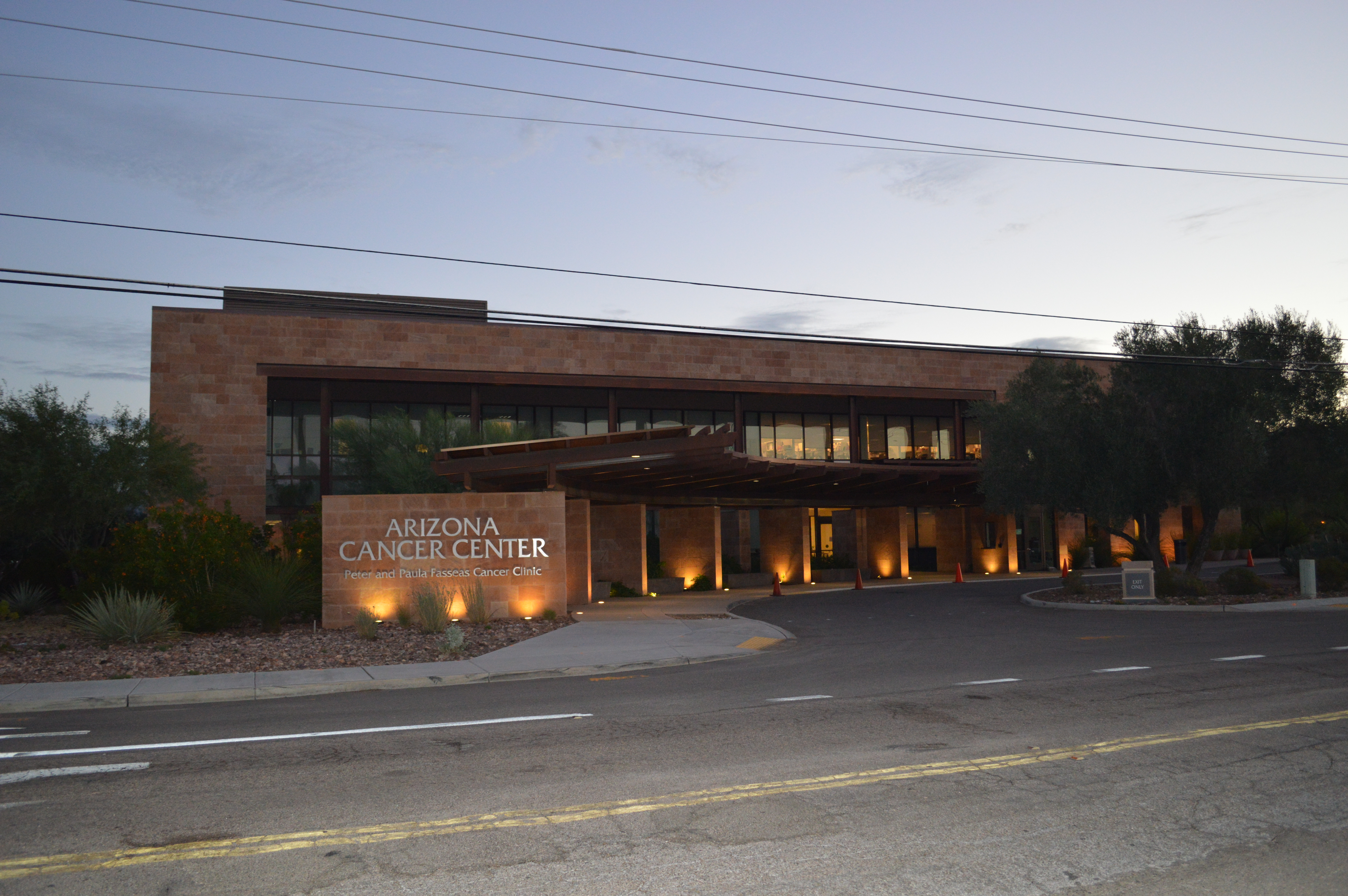
The University of Arizona Cancer Center In Tucson, AZ

=== Banner - University Medical Center Phoenix ===
Banner - University Medical Center Phoenix (formerly Banner Good Samaritan Medical Center, or "Good Sam"), is a 746-bed nonprofit, acute care teaching hospital located in Phoenix, Arizona, providing tertiary and healthcare needs for the Arizona region and surrounding states. Banner - University Medical Center Phoenix is a hospital of the Banner Health System and is one of the flagship facilities of the system. The hospital is affiliated with the University of Arizona Colleges of Medicine in Phoenix and Tucson. The hospital is an American College of Surgeons verified Level 1 Trauma Center and has a rooftop helipad to transport critically ill patients from within the region.

=== Banner MD Anderson Cancer Center ===
Banner Health partnered with The University of Texas M.D. Anderson Cancer Center (based at Texas Medical Center in Houston), consistently one of the two highest-ranked cancer centers by U.S. News & World Report, to build a $100 million cancer center in Gilbert, Arizona at Banner Gateway Medical Center. This facility opened in 2011 and offers outpatient services, including radiation treatment, diagnostic imaging, infusion therapy, cancer-specific clinics and support services. Banner Gateway provides inpatient care such as surgery, interventional radiology, and stem cell transplantation. In March 2014, a 103,000 square feet, $62 million expansion was completed to increase clinic space, infusion bays and radiation oncology facilities. Patients at Banner MD Anderson Cancer Center receive care based on the same protocols and practice standards provided at MD Anderson and benefit from integration with MD Anderson specialists in Houston. The new facilities were designed in collaboration with MD Anderson experts, ensuring state of the art equipment and treatment capabilities are in place. MD Anderson provides clinical direction for the cancer center which is the broadest extension of its services outside Houston.

=== Locations ===
Banner Health is one of the largest, secular nonprofit health care systems in the country. In addition to 33 hospitals, Banner also operates an academic medicine division, Banner – University Medicine, and Banner MD Anderson Cancer Center, a partnership with one of the world’s leading cancer programs, MD Anderson Cancer Center. These facilities can be found Arizona, California, Colorado, Nebraska, Nevada, and Wyoming.

== Leadership ==
Senior leadership of Banner Health as of August 2025:

- Amy Perry, President and CEO
- Marjorie Bessel, MD, Chief Clinical Officer
- Staci Dickerson, Chief Financial Officer
- Julie Ann Alvarado-Dubek, Chief Human Resources Officer
- Jean Fitterer Lance, Chief Legal Officer and General Counsel
- Michael Reagin, Chief Technology Officer

== Awards ==
- 2022 Arizona's Most Admired Companies
- 2021 Arizona's Most Admired Companies
- 2020 Arizona's Most Admired Companies
- 2011 Arizona's Most Admired Companies
- 2010 Arizona's Most Admired Companies
- Top 100 Hospitals to work for, 2009
- Banner - University Medical Center Phoenix, Banner Estrella Medical Center in Phoenix, Banner Gateway Medical Center in Gilbert, and North Colorado Medical Center in Greeley, CO have reached Magnet status

== See also ==
- Banner - University Medical Center Tucson
- Banner Lassen Medical Center
- Banner Desert Medical Center
