= Lyon Street Bridge =

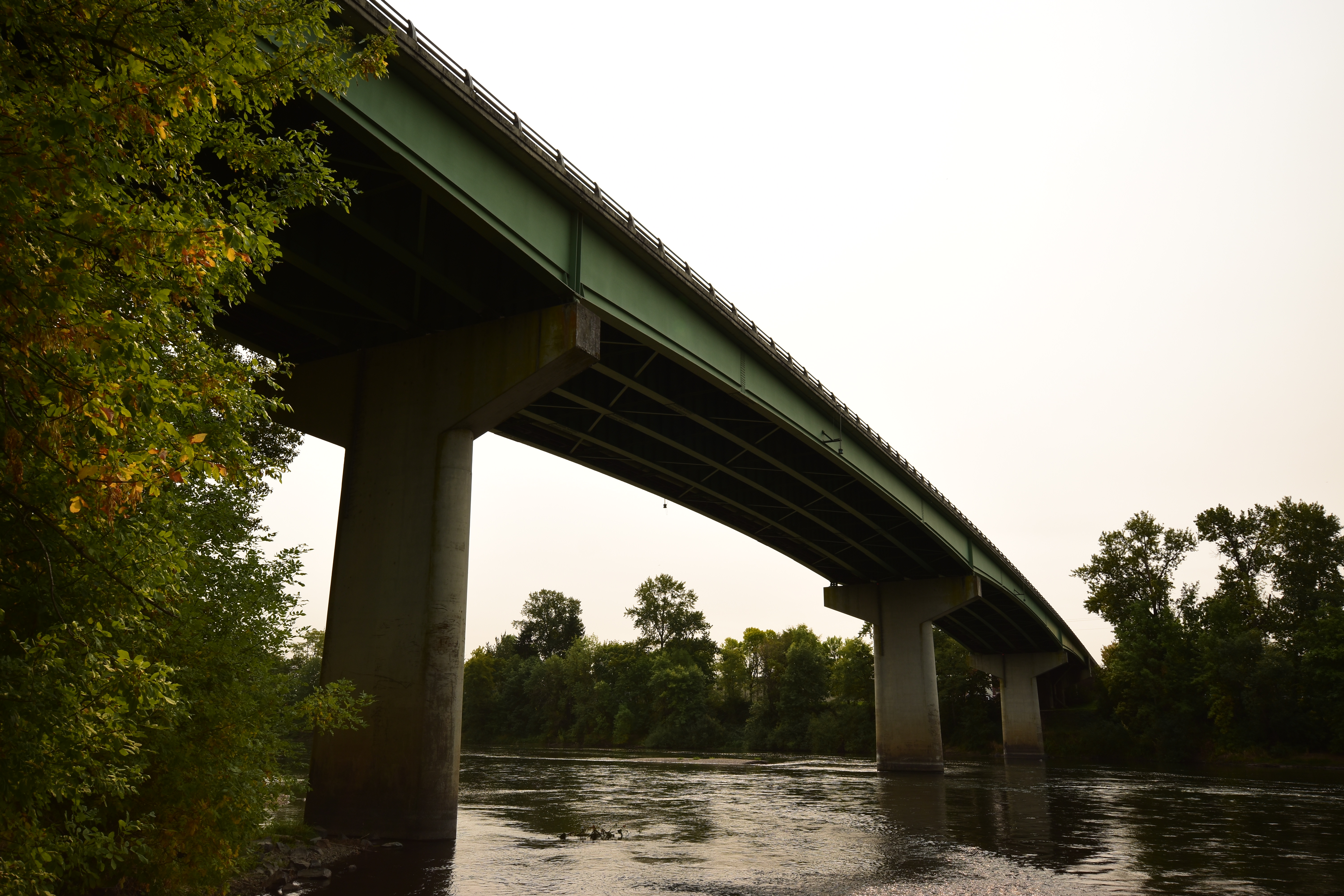
- Coordinates: 44.63931°N 123.10590°W
- Carries: US 20 westbound
- Crosses: Willamette River
- Locale: Albany, Oregon
- Maintained by: Oregon Department of Transportation

Characteristics
- Design: Truss bridge

The Lyon Street Bridge is a highway bridge that crosses the Willamette River in Albany, Oregon, United States. Built in 1973, the two-lane structure carries US 20 westbound traffic, with the adjacent Ellsworth Street Bridge carrying eastbound traffic. The bridge connects Albany with North Albany and is a major link between Albany and Corvallis.

== See also ==
- List of crossings of the Willamette River
