= Samaritani =

Samaritani is a surname. Notable people with the surname include:

- Alberto Alberani Samaritani (born 1947), Italian water polo goalkeeper
- Pierluigi Samaritani (1942–1994), Italian opera director/production designer

== See also ==
- Samaritan (disambiguation)
