= Corvallis Arts Center =

- Episcopal Church of the Good Samaritan
- U.S. National Register of Historic Places
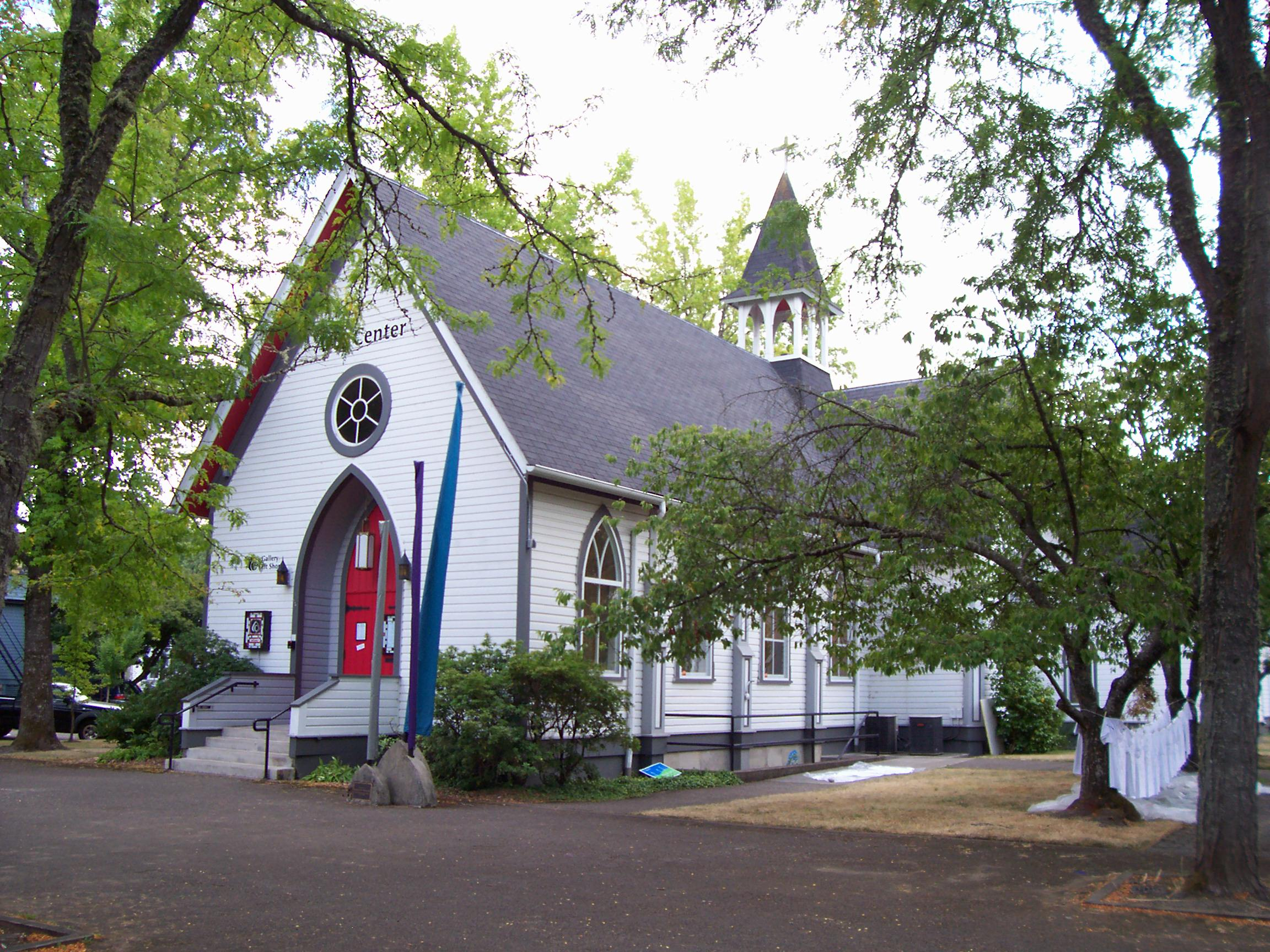
- Historic building (2009)

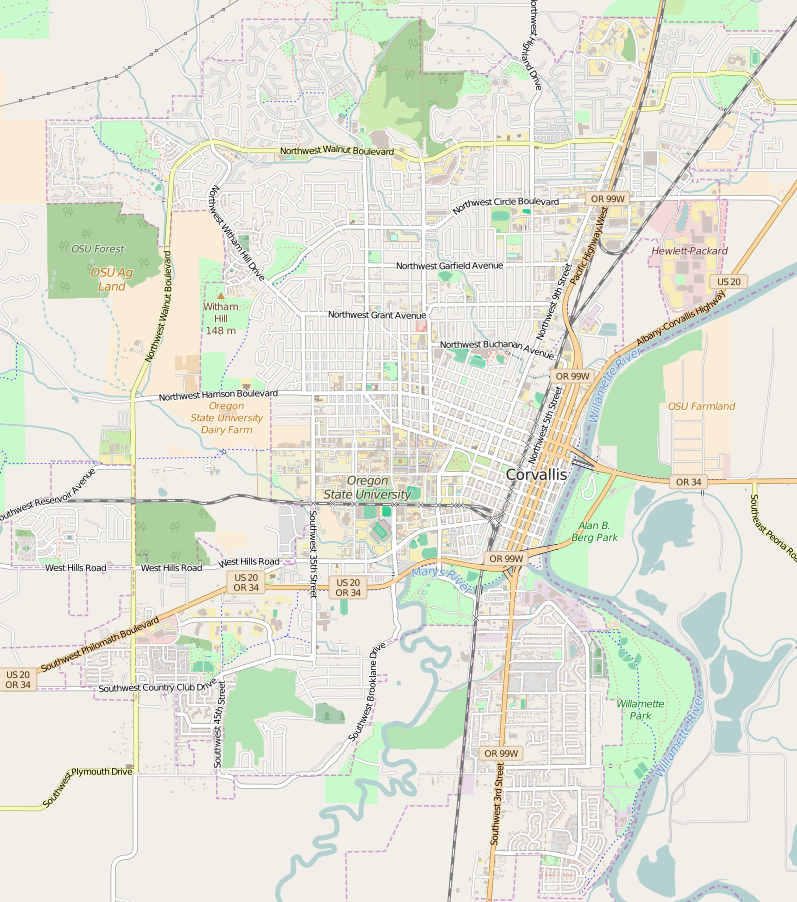
- Location within Corvallis OR Location within Oregon
- Location: 700 SW Madison Ave., Corvallis, Oregon
- Coordinates: 44°33′52″N 123°15′54″W
- Area: 0.3 acres (0.12 ha)
- Built: 1889
- Architectural style: Gothic, Carpenter Gothic
- NRHP reference No.: 71000677
- Added to NRHP: September 10, 1971

The Corvallis Arts Center is a nonprofit organization whose stated mission includes "inspiring creativity and contributing to community well-being" through diverse exhibitions, cultural events and providing the Corvallis, Oregon community with outreach and educational services relating to the arts. The center offers arts experiences, classes and workshops, with a particular focus on the needs of young artists and low barrier community art making. More than a dozen teaching artists working in a range of mediums conduct classes, exhibits, and demonstrations in connection with the center's work.

It operates from a historic building listed on the National Register of Historic Places as "Episcopal Church of the Good Samaritan", built in 1889.

== Establishment ==
The Corvallis Arts Center was created by the Corvallis Arts Council, founded in September 1961, to establish a showplace for the visual arts. At the time of its formation, chair pro tem was Marion Gathercoal. About 20 people participated in the establishment of the group during its first month of existence. Gathercoal was later formally elected as the group's first president by the membership of the council. The Corvallis Arts Council was incorporated as a non-profit corporation in March 1962. It was the first Arts Council in the State of Oregon and Twenty-first in the United States.

=== Historic building ===
For its location, the organization selected the religious assembly hall originally built by the Episcopal Church of the Good Samaritan. After the faith community moved to a different location in 1962, the site had been slated to become the location for a new temple for the Corvallis Elks Lodge. However, another location was eventually found for the lodge. In the meantime, the Arts Center gained access to the building on loan from the Corvallis chapter of the Benevolent and Protective Order of Elks late in 1962.

The building is striking for Carpenter Gothic style, especially its roof truss system.

The center immediately began fundraising to pay for a remodeling of the hall interior, including new paint, carpeting, and furnishings. Additional funds were generated through the sale of $10 "patronages" to interested community members.

While the original lease of the building from the Corvallis Elks Club was a nominal $1 per year, maintenance and utility costs for the facility were pegged at approximately $15,000 per annum by the group's pro bono attorney, Robert Mix. Owing to the expense of the operation, suggestions were made as early as 1963 to place the facility under the umbrella of the Corvallis Parks and Recreation Department.

In 1970, the building was moved about one block north to its current location, Corvallis city property overlooking Central Park, to rest on a new concrete foundation.

In September 1971, the building was added to the National Register of Historic Places. The center has remained in uninterrupted occupation of the facility for over half a century.

=== Grand opening ===
The grand opening of the Corvallis Arts Center took place on the weekend of January 26–27, 1963. Those displaying their works during the opening included graphic artist Junichiro Sekino (1914–1988) of Tokyo as well as a host of staff from the Art Department of Oregon State University. Local art groups including the Corvallis Weavers Guild and the Clay Clan, as well as other craftspeople, attended to demonstrate techniques, and a series of musical performances took place. Over 7,000 people from around Oregon visited the center over the weekend.

Currently

DBA The Arts Center, Inc., features rotating contemporary arts exhibits in Main Gallery, and Corrine Woodman Galleries, an ArtShop gift gallery with over 60 artists local/regional to Corvallis and Oregon, arts education opportunities for all ages, and programming to support working artists.

== See also ==
- National Register of Historic Places listings in Benton County, Oregon
