= Missing Allen =

Missing Allen is a documentary concerning the disappearance and death of the filmmaker Allen Ross, The documentary has been nominated for the Adolf Grimme Award, Best Documentary Award] at the European Film Awards and the German Camera Award for Outstanding Editing. It received a Certificate of Merit at the San Francisco International Film Festival and was named best documentary at Montreal's Festival du Nouveau Cinéma and the Venice International Television Festival.
