= Banner Lassen Medical Center =

- Banner Health

Geography
- Location: Susanville, California, United States
- Coordinates: 40°24′27″N 120°39′44″W

Organization
- Care system: Private, Medicare, Medicaid
- Type: Community

Services
- Emergency department: Level IV trauma center
- Beds: 25

History
- Founded: 1883

Links
- Website: www.bannerhealth.com/...
- Lists: Hospitals in California

The Banner Lassen Medical Center is a 25-bed community hospital in Susanville, California, United States.

== History ==
The hospital originally opened in 1883 as Lassen County Hospital. Lutheran Health System assumed management in 1994 and purchased the hospital from St. Mary's Hospital in 1999. Lutheran Health System later merged with Samaritan Health and became Banner Health. The current facility north of town opened in May 2003.

== See also ==
- List of hospitals in California
