= Bad Samaritans =

Bad Samaritans or Bad Samaritan or variation, may refer to:

- Bad Samaritans: The Myth of Free Trade and the Secret History of Capitalism, a 2007 book by economist Ha-Joon Chang
- Bad Samaritans (TV series), a 2013 comedy web series
- Bad Samaritan (film), a 2016 horror film
- Bad Samaritan, a DC Comics supervillain
- The Bad Samaritan, 1953 play by William Douglas Home

== See also ==
- The Good Samaritan (disambiguation)
- Samaritan (disambiguation)
- Bad (disambiguation)
