= Oregon Health Authority =

State government agency of Oregon, U.S.

Agency overview
- Formed: 2009; 17 years ago
- Jurisdiction: Oregon
- Headquarters: Salem
- Employees: 5,997
- Annual budget: $21 billion
- Agency executives: Dr. Sejal Hathi, MD, MBA, Oregon Health Authority Director; Julie Johnson, Tribal Affairs Director
- Website: www.oregon.gov/oha/Pages/index.aspx

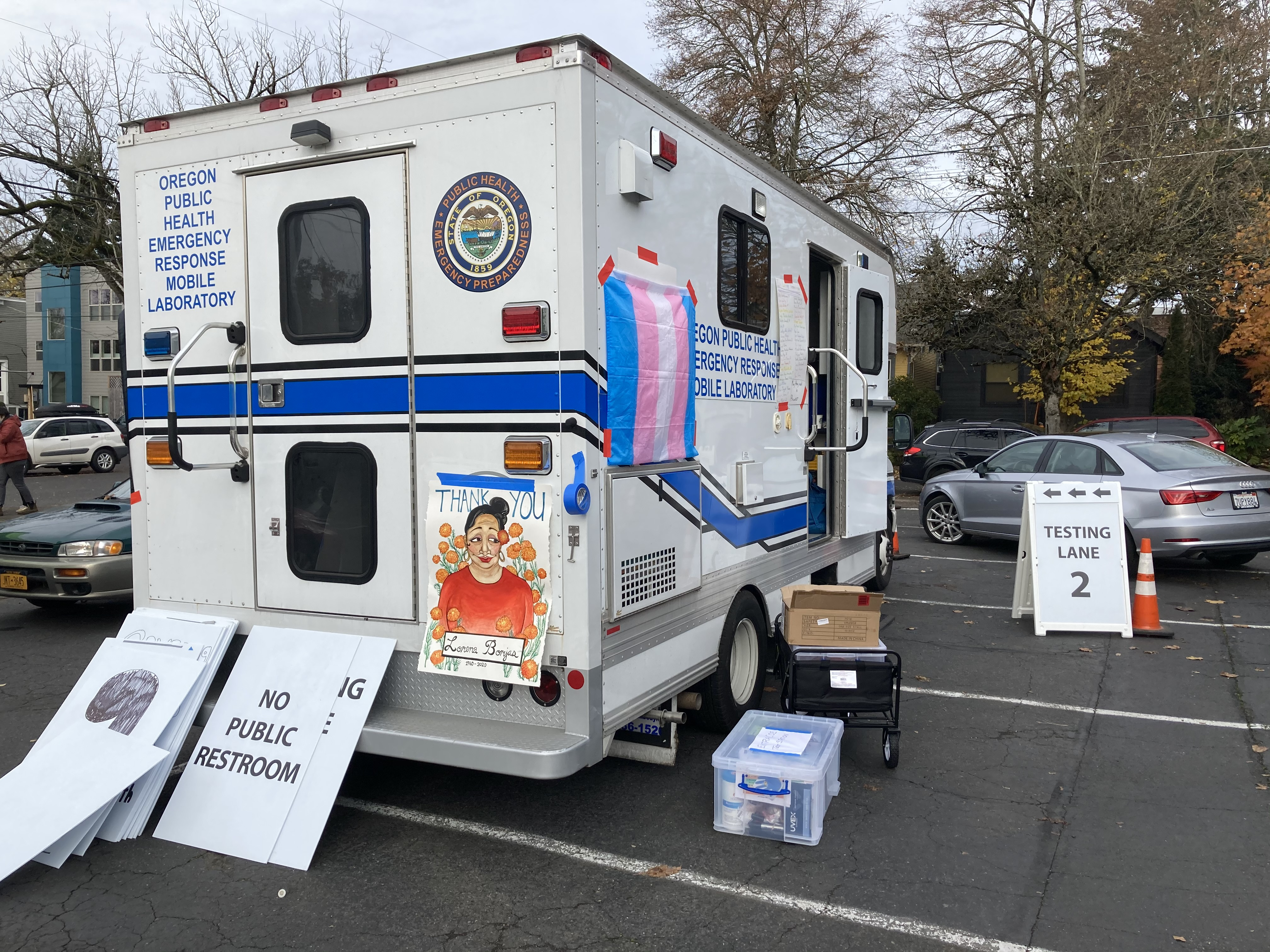
A mobile COVID-19 testing center run by the Oregon Health Authority in November 2020.

The Oregon Health Authority (OHA) is a government agency in the U.S. state of Oregon. It was established by the passage of Oregon House Bill 2009 by the 75th Oregon Legislative Assembly, and split off from Oregon Department of Human Services. OHA oversees most of Oregon's health-related programs including behavioral health (addictions and mental health), public health, Oregon State Hospital for individuals requiring secure residential psychiatric care, and the state's Medicaid program called the Oregon Health Plan. Its policy work is overseen by the nine member Oregon Health Policy Board.

OHA is responsible for the state's Medicaid program, which is operated under a Medicaid Demonstration waiver from the U.S. Centers for Medicare and Medicaid Services (CMS), known as an 1115 Waiver. The demonstration includes coordinated care organizations (a form of accountable care organization or ACO) as the Medicaid delivery system; flexibility in use of federal funds by the CCOs; and a federal investment of approximately $1.9 billion over five years, tied to an agreement by the state to reduce the trend in per-capita medical spending by two percentage points by the end of the waiver's second year.

== Divisions ==
OHA consists of these divisions:

- Behaviorial Health
- Equity and Inclusion
- External Relations
- Fiscal and Operations
- Health Policy and Analytics
- Health Systems
- Medicaid
- Oregon State Hospital
- Public Health
