= North Albany Clubhouse =

- U.S. National Register of Historic Places
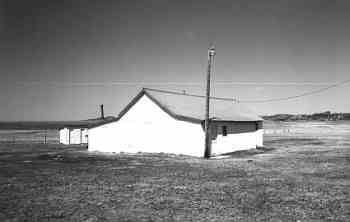
- Nearest city: Garrett Route, Wyoming
- Area: less than one acre
- Built: 1928
- Built by: Community of North Albany County
- NRHP reference No.: 98000908
- Added to NRHP: July 23, 1998

The North Albany Clubhouse stands by itself in rural Albany County, Wyoming. It was built in 1928 as a community meeting center by local residents. It continues to serve as a community social center. The clubhouse was placed on the National Register of Historic Places on July 23, 1998.
