= Good Samaritan Regional Medical Center (Oregon) =

- Samaritan Health Services
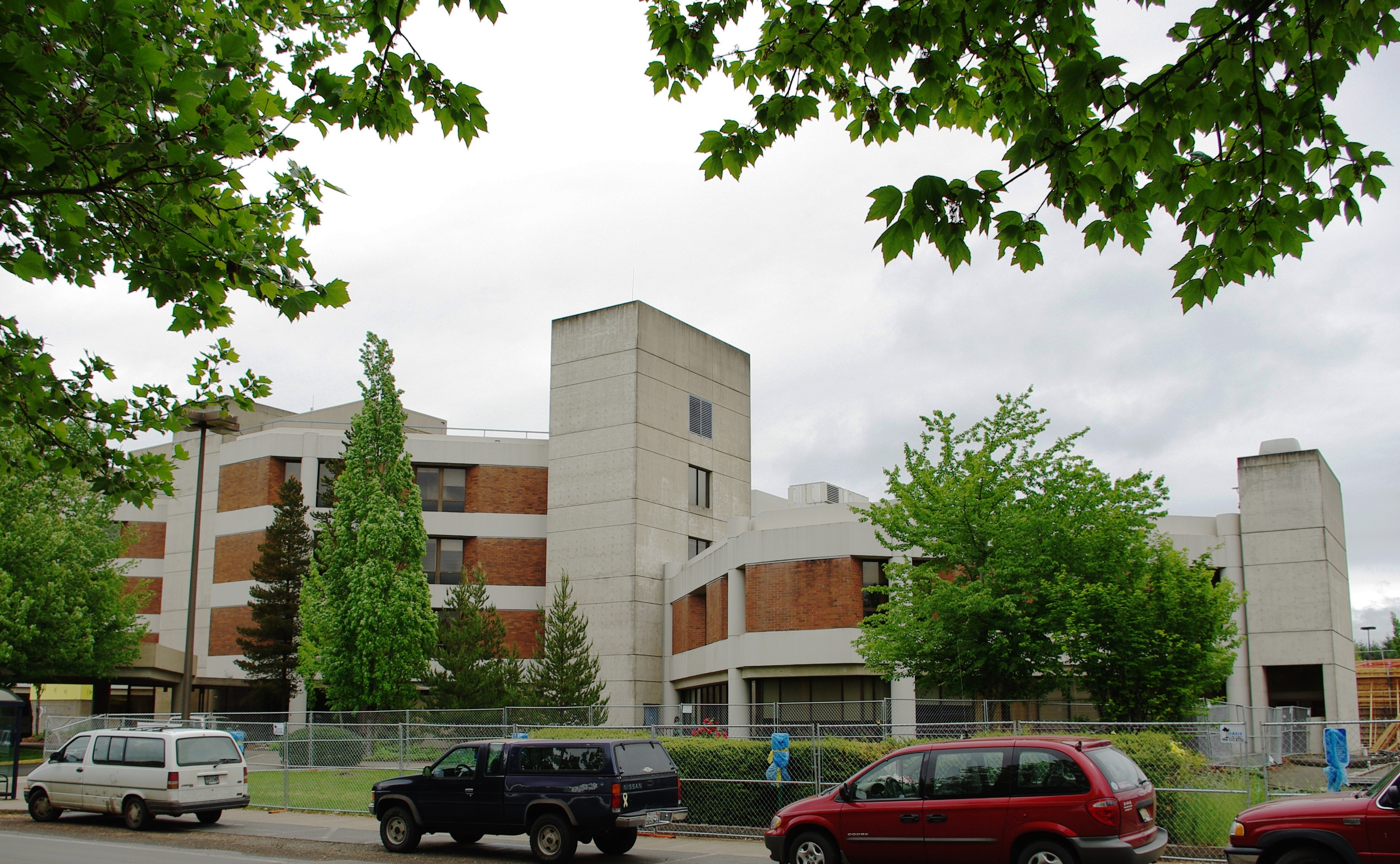
- Main building

Geography
- Location: 3600 NW Samaritan Drive, Corvallis, Oregon, United States
- Coordinates: 44°36′8″N 123°15′6″W

Organization
- Care system: Medicare/Medicaid/charity
- Type: Teaching
- Affiliated university: Western University of Health Sciences COMP-NW

Services
- Emergency department: Level II trauma center
- Beds: 188

Helipads
- Helipad: Aeronautical chart and airport information for OR55 at SkyVector

History
- Former name: Corvallis General Hospital
- Founded: 1913

Links
- Website: samhealth.org/find-a-location/good-samaritan-regional-medical-center/
- Lists: Hospitals in Oregon

Good Samaritan Regional Medical Center is a 188-bed teaching hospital located in Corvallis, Oregon, United States. Founded in 1913, it is the only hospital in the city. The hospital operates a level II trauma center, and serves the Linn, Benton, and Lincoln County area. It is one of only five level II trauma centers in the state of Oregon. The hospital operates a number of residency training and fellowship programs for newly graduated physicians, psychologists, and pharmacists. It also has a partnership with Western University of Health Sciences College of Osteopathic Medicine of the Pacific, Northwest (COMP-NorthWest), the first Oregon medical school to open in more than 100 years.

It was established as Corvallis General Hospital in 1913. The Episcopal Church in Western Oregon, enabled the hospital's reorganization as a not-for-profit facility in 1948. The hospital serves as the hub for the operations of Samaritan Health Services. It is accredited by the Joint Commission on Accreditation of Healthcare Organizations.

== History ==
Started as Corvallis General Hospital, the original facility was located on Northwest Harrison Boulevard. After World War II the hospital was on the brink of bankruptcy, unable to pay off its bonds. In an effort to retire the debt the hospital was put under the auspices of the Episcopal Diocese of Oregon.

In 1948, Corvallis General was reconstituted as a nonprofit organization and renamed Samaritan Inc. Good Samaritan Hospital.

In 1975, the hospital moved to its current location on an 84-acre campus in North Corvallis overlooking Oregon Route 99W and became a part of what is now known as the Good Samaritan Regional Medical Center. The hospital has maintained its affiliation with the Episcopal Diocese of Oregon and has continued to thrive. Today it is the flagship institution of Samaritan Health Services.

The original hospital building on Harrison was demolished in 2011. A four-story 68-unit apartment complex named The Union was built in its place in 2012.

In 2020, the hospital treated patients for COVID-19 infection, as the global pandemic developed.

== Operations ==
The medical center has 188 licensed beds (165 available for short-term patients) and is the only major hospital in Benton County. Services at the facility include 22 medial specialties such as maternity, surgery, radiology, heart and vascular services, pediatrics, mental health, an intensive care unit, oncology, laboratory services, neurology, dialysis, and emergency services, among others. It is accredited by the Joint Commission on Accreditation of Health Care Organizations (JCAHO).

The acute care facility is one of only 5 level-two trauma centers in the state of Oregon and serves the entire county, plus portions of neighboring counties. More than 2,669 employees and over 200 volunteers support its operations and the SHS mission of "building healthier communities together". During 2024, GSRMC served 8,491 inpatients, had 33,780 emergency department visits, performed 11,168 surgeries and delivered 957 babies. In addition, GSRMC performed 121,130 imaging procedures and had 280,868 physician clinic visits.

The Good Samaritan Regional Medical Center Hospital Heliport is located at the hospital.

== Graduate medical education ==
Good Samaritan Regional Medical Center operates a number of residency training and fellowship programs for newly graduated physicians since 2009. The residencies train physicians specializing in: dermatology, family medicine, internal medicine, psychiatry, child and adolescent psychiatry, general surgery, orthopedic surgery, and cardiology. In addition to medical education, the hospital also runs residency training programs in psychology, pharmacy, and sports physical therapy. The physical therapy program is accredited by the American Board of Physical Therapy Residency and Fellowship Education.

It also has a partnership with Western University of Health Sciences College of Osteopathic Medicine of the Pacific, Northwest (COMP-NorthWest), the first Oregon medical school to open in more than 100 years.

== Awards ==
In 2018 Samaritan Health Services was listed as one of three finalists for the 2017 American Hospital Association Foster G. McGaw Prize for Excellence in Community Service, a national award that recognizes hospitals and hospital systems for improving the healthcare of their patients and communities.

In 2020 Healthgrades gave Good Samaritan Regional Medical Center the Outstanding Patient Experience Award.

The American Heart Association gave Good Samaritan Regional Medical Center the Stroke Gold Plus Quality Achievement and Target: Stroke Honor Role Elite Award in 2023 and 2024.

== See also ==
- List of hospitals in Oregon
