= Ellsworth Street Bridge =

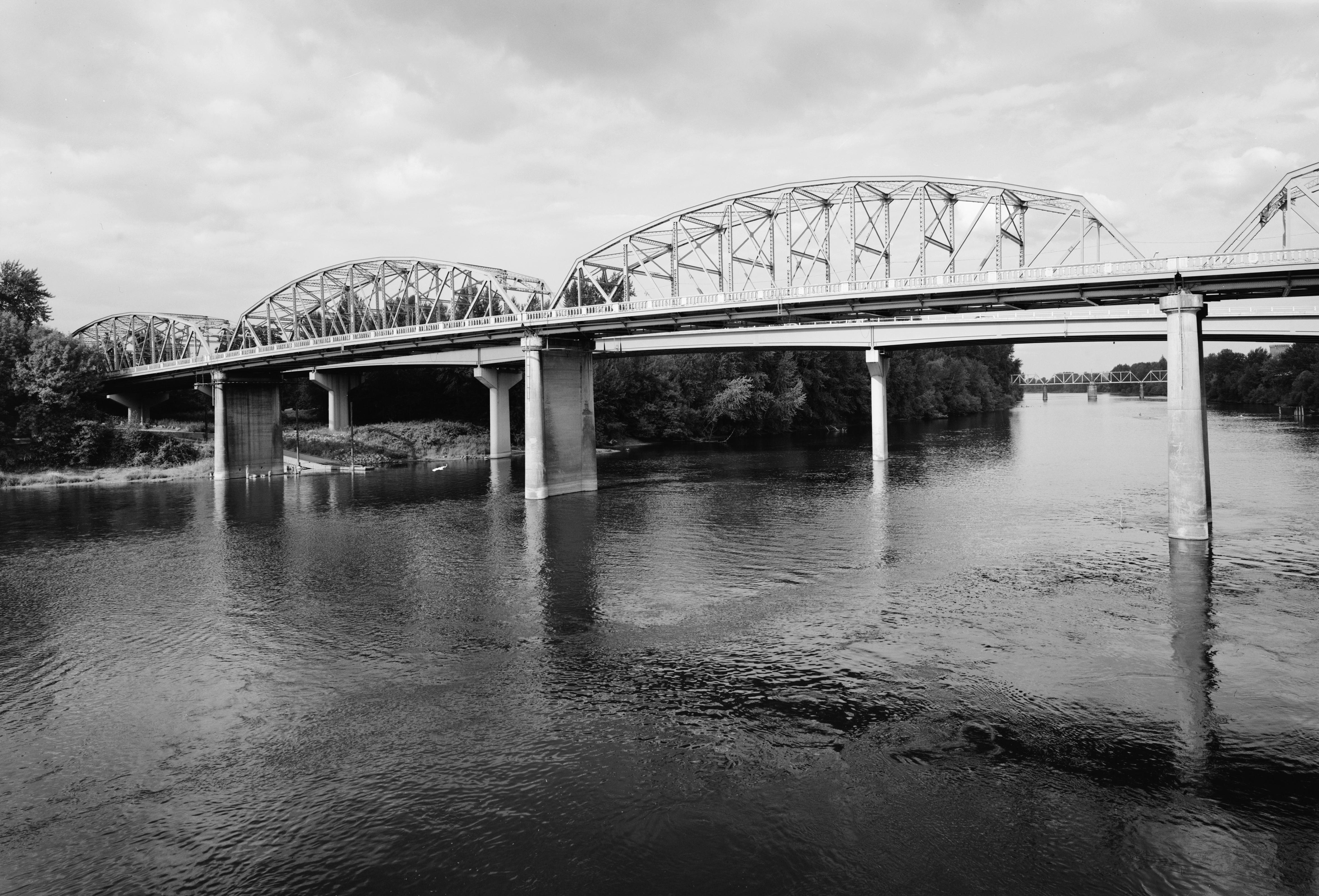
- Coordinates: 44.6393°N 123.106635°W
- Carries: US 20
- Crosses: Willamette River
- Locale: Albany, Oregon
- Maintained by: Oregon Department of Transportation

Characteristics
- Design: Truss bridge
- Total length: 1,090 feet (330 m)
- Width: 26 feet (7.9 m)
- Longest span: 800 feet (240 m)

History
- Opened: 1926

Location
- Interactive map of Ellsworth Street Bridge

The Ellsworth Street Bridge is a highway bridge that crosses the Willamette River in Albany, Oregon, United States. Built in 1925, the two-lane structure carries U.S. Route 20 eastbound traffic, with the adjacent Lyon Street Bridge carrying westbound traffic. The 1,090-foot-long (330 m) steel truss bridge was designed by Conde McCullough and opened in 1926.

== History ==
In 1887, a bridge was built across the Willamette River at Albany for the Corvallis and Eastern Railroad followed by the Steel Bridge built in 1893 just downriver. The state of Oregon began building a new bridge across the river at the city in 1925 to carry vehicular traffic. Designed by state highway department bridge designer Conde McCullough, it was constructed by the Union Bridge Company based in Portland, Oregon. The steel truss structure was completed in 1926.

When the bridge opened, the Albany-Corvallis Highway was completed. At the time the structure was named the Albany Bridge. In 1973, the neighboring Lyon Street Bridge was completed to the east to expand capacity to a total of four lanes between the two bridges. Ellsworth Street Bridge was refurbished in 1971 and 2002. As of 2004, the bridge handled an average of 9,850 cars per day.

== Details ==
Classified as functionally obsolete with a 53.8-percent sufficiency rating, the two-lane bridge carries eastbound traffic of U.S. Route 20 south into downtown Albany at milepost 10.44. The bridge's main span consists of four steel through-trusses in the Parker style, each 200 feet (61 m) in length. Ellsworth Street Bridge is a total of 1,090 feet (330 m) long and 26 feet (7.9 m) wide with a vertical clearance of 25 feet (7.6 m). The seven concrete approaches are of a girder design. The green colored bridge also has ornate concrete railings and entrance pylons. Ellsworth Street Bridge was one of the few steel truss bridges completed while McCullough was in charge of bridge design in Oregon, and it is one of the few multi-span steel truss bridges remaining in the state.

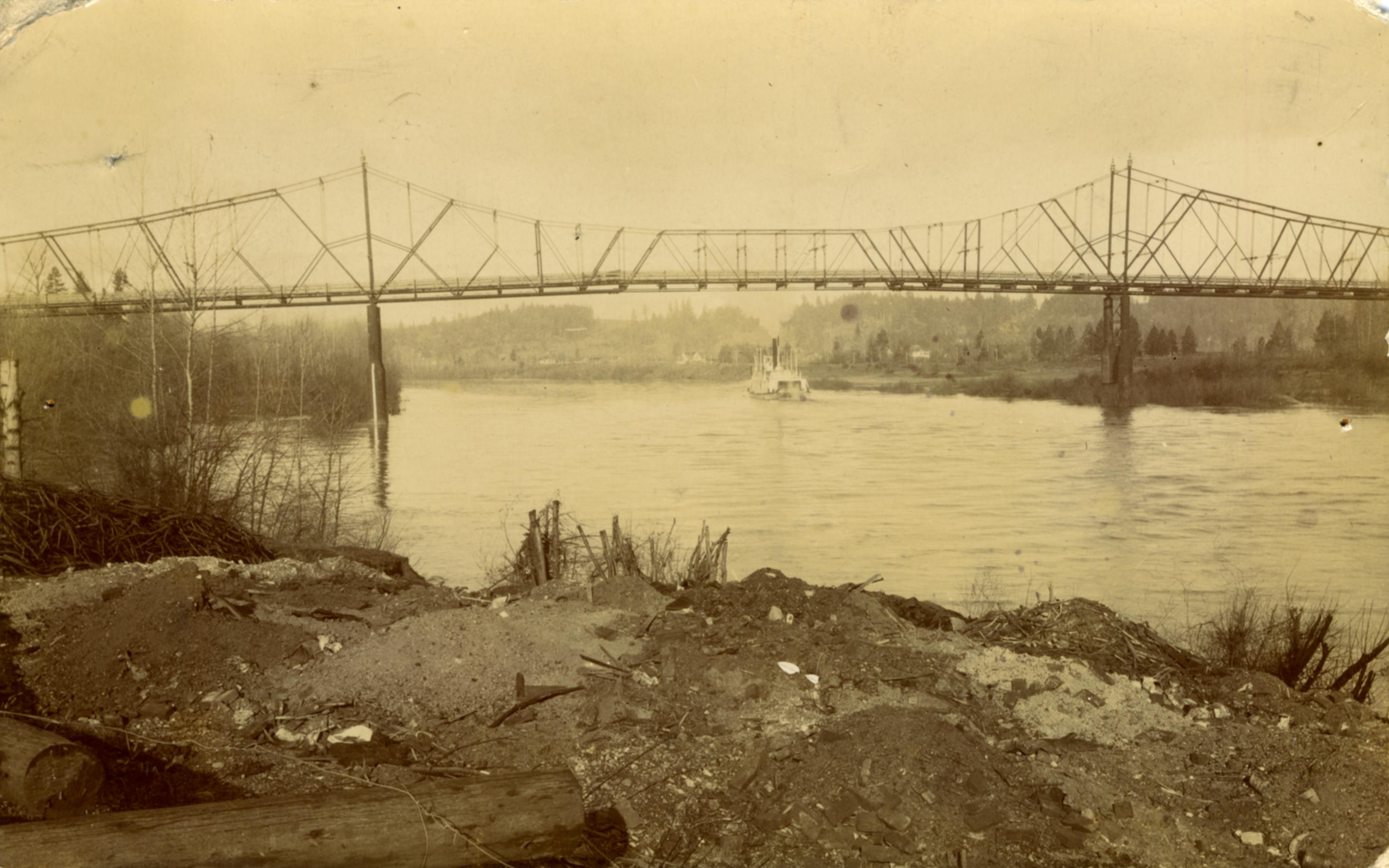
The 1893-built Steel Bridge was replaced by the Ellsworth Street Bridge in 1926.

== See also ==
- List of bridges documented by the Historic American Engineering Record in Oregon
- List of crossings of the Willamette River
- Picture from 2008
