= Death of Allen Ross =

Cult murder victim

US filmmaker Allen Ross married Linda Greene and followed her cult, the Samaritan Foundation, based in Guthrie, Oklahoma, US. The couple moved from place to place following her instructions. Following Allen's murder on November 22, 1995, the group disbanded. Prosecutors believe that Linda Greene committed the murder. She died of liver failure in 2002 and was never charged. A cult member, Julia Williams, was found guilty of being an accessory after the fact to murder, by helping to bury the body in the basement. She was sentenced to two years in prison.

Ross' remains were found in July 2000 in his Cheyenne, Wyoming home.

== Media accounts ==
Ross' disappearance is depicted in the 2001 documentary, Missing Allen, and in the Dateline NBC episode, "Searching for Allen"."The Bad Samaritans", a 2013 episode of Deadly Devotion, which aired on Investigation Discovery, also recounted the story. A 2017 episode of Ghost Adventures, entitled "Samaritan Cult House" features an investigation of the former prison building in Guthrie, Oklahoma, in which the cult resided from the 1990s to early 2000s.
