= Samaritan Health System =

US hospital network and health care system

Samaritan Health System was a hospital network and health care system which was located in Arizona from 1911 to 1999, when it merged to become part of Banner Health.

== History ==
In 1911, when Arizona was a territory, the first hospital in the city of Phoenix, Arizona, was started by a Methodist Deaconess, Miss Lulu Clifton, who was cured of tuberculosis by living in the dry Arizona climate. She attempted to repay the community by working to establish Arizona Deaconess Hospital, a Methodist entity. The hospital provided care to those with respiratory diseases and helped meet the medical needs of the small but growing community. The hospital's name was changed to Good Samaritan Hospital in 1928. Community leaders were actively involved in the board of the hospital and helped obtain financing to serve the Phoenix's rapidly expanding population. A nursing school operated on site at the hospital from 1924–1973. Good Samaritan Hospital eventually grew to accommodate 720 beds, becoming a non-profit teaching facility, the largest tertiary hospital in the state, and a level one trauma center.

The 1950s and 1960s brought explosive growth to Phoenix and the need to rapidly expand hospital services in a cost-effective manner. In the 1960s, Good Samaritan’s board, at the request of surrounding community hospital boards, took over the ownership and management of hospitals in Mesa/Tempe and Maryvale/Glendale communities. This resulted in a 1576 bed four Valley hospital system consisting of Good Samaritan, Desert Samaritan, Maryvale Samaritan, and Glendale/Thunderbird Samaritan Hospitals, creating one of the first not for profit multi hospital systems. To streamline costs, many overhead services were centralized. This new health network was initially called Samaritan Health Service and later Samaritan Health System. Stephen Morris, former Good Samaritan Administrator, became CEO for Samaritan, overseeing its growth and consolidation over the next two decades. A board of directors made up of the top executives of Phoenix entities lead the growth and direction of the system.

By the 1970s, Phoenix was the ninth largest metropolitan area in the country. Samaritan’s management and board decided to extend services and management expertise to other regional hospitals and clinics such as Lake Havasu, San Clemente, White Mountains, Page, Grand Canyon, and Williams.

The 1980s brought major capital replacement and improvement of the four valley hospitals as well as vertical and horizontal expansion to meet the needs of the community. Two community health plans were added: Samaritan Health Plan, a commercial managed care plan, and Arizona Physicians IPA (Independent Physicians Association), established to support implementation of Medicaid in Arizona. Further expansion included nursing home and behavioral health facilities, air ambulance, and other outpatient services. The sale of Samaritan Health System to a large for-profit entity was also considered but rejected by Samaritan’s Board.

The 1990s was a decade of reorganization, partnerships, streamlining of asset ownership and consideration of merger partners to further strengthen the organization and meet the capital needs of the future. In 1999, Samaritan Health System merged with Lutheran Health Systems to form Banner Health, a multi-state non-profit health care system.

== See also ==
- Banner health
