= North Albany, Oregon =

Unincorporated community in the state of Oregon, United States

- Unincorporated community
- Location within Oregon Location within the United States
- Coordinates: 44.653°N 123.102°W
- Country: United States
- State: Oregon
- County: Benton
- Elevation: 197 ft (60 m)

Population (2020)
  - Total: 11,273
- Time zone: UTC-8 (Pacific (PST))
  - Summer (DST): UTC-7 (PDT)
- ZIP code: 97321
- Area codes: 458 and 541

North Albany is the portion of Albany, Oregon, United States that lies in Benton County. As of the 2020 United States census, it was estimated to have 11,273 of Albany's 56,472 people. As of 2023, North Albany is the second largest city in Benton County, Oregon behind Corvallis, Oregon (61,087) and ahead of Philomath, Oregon (5,838).

== History ==
The first European settlers to come into the area arrived in the 1880s, along with the construction of the Lafayette Street railroad trestle for the Corvallis and Eastern Railroad, which crossed the Willamette River in the Albany area. William Peacock was one of North Albany's early settlers, once he purchased a 20-acre farm in 1883. In the 1890s, he built an Italianate Farmhouse-style home on the property that today still stands and is known as the Peacock House. During the same period of time, the steel bridge was built to connect street traffic from Albany to North Albany and later replace with Ellsworth Street Bridge in 1925.

Not until the 1930s did the area see a major growth, when the construction of the Laurel Heights subdivision commenced in North Albany, along with the Gibson Hill Water Association, to bring the first water district to North Albany.

In 1961, North Albany saw its first annexation from the city of Albany, covering most of the land from the river up to Hickory Street. Twenty years later, in 1981, Albany adopted a new urban growth boundary to contain the rest of North Albany, following along a different water district. Then, in 1991, voters approved annexation for the rest of the land inside the urban growth boundary. It formed what is now the North Albany District of Albany.
