= The Good Samaritan (sculpture) =

1936 neoclassical sculpture in Szczecin, Poland

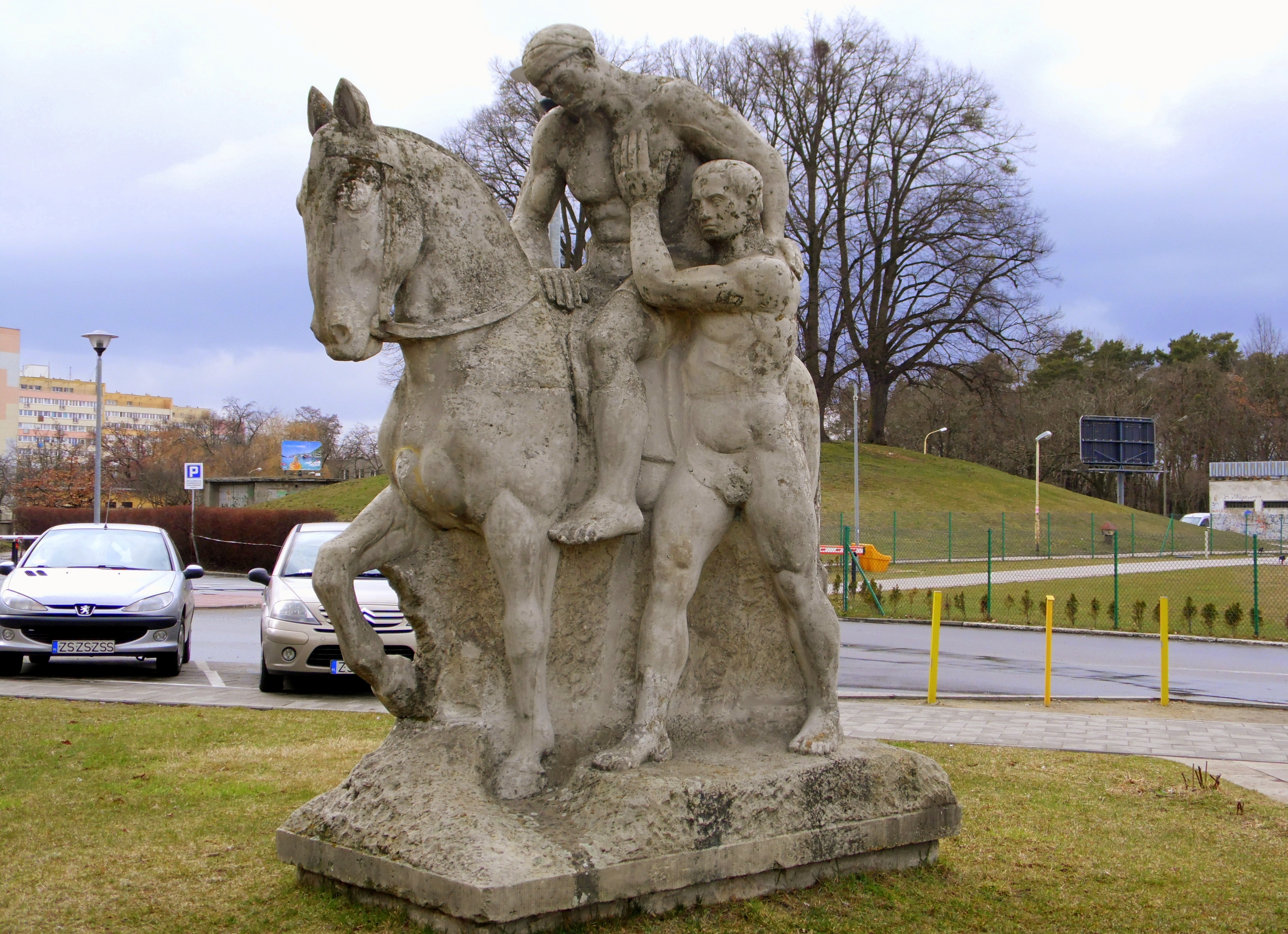
- Artist: Georg Morin
- Year: 1936
- Movement: Neoclassicism
- Dimensions: 300 cm × 132 cm × 230 cm (120 in × 52 in × 91 in)
- Location: 1 Unii Lubelskiej Street, Pogodno, Szczecin, Poland; 53°26′59.0″N 14°30′21.2″E

The Good Samaritan (Polish: Miłosierny Samarytanin; German: Barmherziger Samariter) is a neoclassical sandstone sculpture by Georg Morin, displayed in Szczecin, Poland. It is placed in front of the Independent Public Clinical Hospital at 1 Unii Lubelskiej Street, within the neighbourhood of Pogodno in the West district. It was created in 1936, and unveiled around 1938. The sculpture depicts two athletic men, with one is supporting a wounded comrade riding a horse, while walking next to it.

== History ==
The sandstone sculpture was created by Georg Morin in 1936, and unveiled around 1938 in front of the German Air Force military hospital in Szczecin. Currently the building, located at 1 Unii Lubelskiej Street, houses the Independent Public Clinical Hospital. It begen being informally referred as The Good Samaritan after the Second World War, in the reference to the parable of the Good Samaritan from the New Testament.

== Characteristics ==
The sculpture depicts two athletic men, with one is supporting a wounded comrade riding a horse, while walking next to it. It is made from sandstone, and has the height of 3 m. It is placed on a rectangular base, inscribed with the name of the author, Georg Morinm, with the length of 2.3 m and the wight of 1.32 m. The sculture has a neoclassical form, with the characteristics of the Nazi Germany art.
