= Oregon Health Plan =

Oregon state Medicaid program

The Oregon Health Plan is Oregon's state Medicaid program. It is overseen by the Oregon Health Authority.

== History ==
The Oregon Health Plan was conceived and realized in 1993 by emergency room doctor (and subsequent Oregon governor) John Kitzhaber, then a state senator, and Dr. Ralph Crawshaw, a Portland activist. It was intended to make health care more available to the working poor, while rationing benefits. During the 1990s, Oregon was considered a national leader in health care reform.

The law passed in Oregon was not initially compatible with federal law, so a waiver was needed. President Bill Clinton approved the plan on March 20, 1993, though he required a revision to the plan due to a concern about whether disabled people would have equal access. At the time, Medicaid covered 240,000 Oregonians. In 1994, the plan's first year of operation, nearly 120,000 new members enrolled, and bad debts at Portland hospitals dropped 16%.

The cost of the Oregon Health Plan increased from $1.33 billion in 1993–1995 to $2.36 billion in 1999–2001, leading to budget-tightening measures in the early 2000s; significant cuts would follow in 2003.

New enrollment in the program was closed from mid-2004 until early 2008, when a lottery-based system was introduced. Tens of thousands of Oregonians signed up, competing for 3,000 openings. In 2008, the Oregon Health Authority began implementing changes to Medicaid policy to increase screening rates and provide more access to services for young children at risk of developmental disorders. Some of these changes included revising certification requirements for patient-centered medical home (PCMH) status to include developmental screenings for children at the 9-month, 18-month, and 30-month well-child visits.

The Oregon Health Plan was expanded to cover 80,000 uninsured children through legislation that passed in 2009. The program has enrolled 38,000 additional children through February, 2010. As of 2012, there are more than 100,000 children enrolled.

Oregon's proposed Oregon Health Plan (Medicaid) transformation was initiated by Oregon House Bill 3650, which was passed by the state Legislature with bi-partisan support in June 2011. In March, Oregon Senate Bill 1580 was signed into law by Governor John Kitzhaber establishing Coordinated Care Organizations, which will focus on prevention and coordination of physical, mental and dental care for Oregon Health Plan clients.

Starting in 2012, Oregon Health Plan clients have a new type of health plan called Coordinated Care Organizations or CCOs. A CCO is a network of all types of health care providers who are working together for people who receive health care coverage under the Oregon Health Plan. CCOs integrate physical, mental and eventually dental care for better health, better care and lower costs. CCOs focus on prevention of illness and disease and improving care to keep patients healthy and to manage existing health conditions.

The legal foundation for the OHP is generally spelled out in Chapter 414 of the Oregon Revised Statutes.

== Eligibility ==
Basic eligibility requires that the applicant be a resident of Oregon, as a citizen or otherwise. The level of coverage is based on income, age, mental and physical condition.

In 2014, the state implemented the Affordable Care Act's Medicaid expansion, folding previous OHP eligibility requirements into a single income requirement; up to 138% of the federal poverty level. By December 2014, enrollment in Oregon's Medicaid and CHIP programs had increased to 1,030,940 people (26% of the state population).

== Coverage ==
Since a February 2003 adjustment to the Oregon Health Plan, it consists of two main plans, OHP Plus and OHP Standard.

=== OHP Plus ===
OHP Plus is a full benefit package offered to children and adults who are eligible for Medicaid or for the Children's Health Insurance Program. The OHP Plus package has no premiums, but some adults may be required to pay small copayments for outpatient services and some prescription drugs.

In January 2010, most vision and some dental benefits were cut from OHP Plus due to budget deficits with the benefits partially restored later in January 2014.

=== OHP Standard ===
OHP Standard is a limited benefit package covering a limited number of uninsured adults who are not eligible for Medicaid. In 2003, when OHP Standard began requiring small premiums of most adult participants, around 40,000 Oregonians (many homeless, destitute or mentally ill) were unable to pay the premium and were disenrolled from the program. Significant cuts were made to the Oregon Health Plan's budget in 2003. Today, the monthly premiums are still required, but there are no copayments.

Effective January 2014, the OHP Standard package was transitioned into OHP Plus as part of the state's implementation of the federal Patient Protection and Affordable Care Act.

== Managed care contractors ==
As a Medicaid managed care system, the plan has contracts with a number of private and nonprofit companies who provide care for a capitated fee. In 2012, a Section 1115 Medicaid waiver designed a new type of plan called Coordinated Care Organizations, which included some of the preexisting organizations such as CareOregon, PacificSource, and FamilyCare as well as independent practice associations.

In 2017, the second-largest Medicaid insurer, FamilyCare, shut down; its 100k Portland-area will largely be absorbed by another Medicaid insurer, Health Share. Health Share is related to CareOregon, which absorbed 80k members.

From 2016 to 2018, CareOregon, which was founded in 1994 by providers with the Oregon Primary Care Association, Oregon Health Sciences University, and Multnomah County Health Department, lost about $96m. Various other plans showed losses as well.

== Controversy ==
The Oregon Health Plan became the focus of national scrutiny in 2003, after deep budget cuts led to 100,000 people in mental health and/or substance abuse treatment losing prescription coverage under the program.

During 2008 and 2009, the Oregon Health Plan stirred up controversy when enforcing 1994 guidelines to only cover comfort care, and not to cover cancer treatment such as chemotherapy, surgery and radiotherapy for patients with less than a 5% chance of survival over five years.

Springfield resident Barbara Wagner said her oncologist prescribed the chemotherapy drug Tarceva for her lung cancer, but that Oregon Health Plan officials sent her a letter declining coverage for the drug, and informing her that they will only pay for palliative care and physician-assisted dying. She appealed the denial twice, but lost both times. Tarceva drugmaker Genentech agreed to supply her the $4,000-a-month drug free of charge. Wagner's plight garnered a flurry of attention from the media, the internet, and triggered protest from religious groups.

On August 26, 2008, former Oregon Governor John Kitzhaber and Somnath Saha, a Portland physician and then-chairwoman of the Oregon Health Services Commission, issued an op-ed in The Oregonian newspaper in response to the twisting of Wagner's story in the media. According to Kitzhaber and Saha, the Oregon Health Plan covers nearly all chemotherapy prescribed for cancer patients, including the multiple rounds of chemotherapy that Wagner received; Wagner's request for second-line treatment was denied because of the drug's limited benefit and very high cost, which would have led to the denial of access to well-established, first-line treatments for other cancer patients. Kitzhaber and Saha stated that "the idea that treatment has ever been denied because death would be more 'cost effective'...is both abhorrent and a blatant distortion of the facts. [T]he fact that [physician aid in dying] is covered by the health plan has no bearing on the decision in this or any other case."

Wagner died in October 2008, three weeks after starting Tarceva.

== Ongoing legislative efforts ==
Following the end of two terms as Governor of Oregon, Kitzhaber established the Archimedes Movement, which aims to be a grassroots effort toward crafting legislation and solving Oregon's health care problems. The Archimedes Movement also has a close relationship with the Foundation for Medical Excellence.

The 2007 Oregon legislative session passed the Healthy Oregon Act (Senate Bill 329), which established the Oregon Health Fund Board. This seven member advisory panel worked with former Governor Ted Kulongoski to propose legislation for the 2009 session. Among other challenges, the board has been advised that changes in federal requirements will affect funds that currently support 24,000 Oregonians on the OHP Standard plan.

In June 2011, the Oregon Legislature with bi-partisan support created Medicaid (Oregon Health Plan) transformation with House Bill 3650. The goal of this legislation is to develop a health care delivery system managed by Coordinated Care Organization for Oregon Health Plan clients that are community-based, and have the flexibility to deliver better care, better health at lower costs. In March, 2012, Oregon Senate Bill 1580 was signed into law by Governor John Kitzhaber establishing Coordinated Care Organizations for Oregon Health Plan clients.

In August 2012, the first Coordinated Care Organizations opened to serve Oregon Health Plan clients.

== See also ==
- Oregon Medicaid health experiment
