= Episcopal Church of the Good Samaritan =

Good Sam Church
- Episcopal Church of the Good Samaritan
- Good Sam Church
- 44.56°N 123.26°W
- Location: Corvallis, Oregon
- Country: United States
- Denomination: Episcopal
- Website: goodsamcorvallis.org

History
- Events: Construction of the historic building on 700 SW Madison, now occupied by the Corvallis Arts Center

Architecture
- Functional status: Active

Specifications
- Materials: Brick, Timber, Stained Glass

Administration
- Diocese: Episcopal Diocese of Oregon

Clergy
- Bishop: Diana Akiyama
- Priest: David Marshall

The Episcopal Church of the Good Samaritan is a multigenerational Episcopal faith community in Corvallis, Oregon. Originally located in the historic building on Madison and 7th, the church now holds services from its 1962 location on the corner of Harrison and 35th. The church reported 689 members in 2018 and 542 members in 2023; no membership statistics were reported in 2024 parochial reports. Plate and pledge income reported for the congregation in 2024 was $460,294. Average Sunday attendance (ASA) in 2024 was 150 persons.

== History ==
The first recorded Episcopal service in Corvallis (then known as Marysville) was held by Dr. John McCarty in 1853. By 1871, occasional services had grown into a mission, St. Mary's School for girls. The school closed after two years, but the school chapel, named the Chapel of the Good Samaritan, remained in use until a church could be built.

=== Historic Building ===
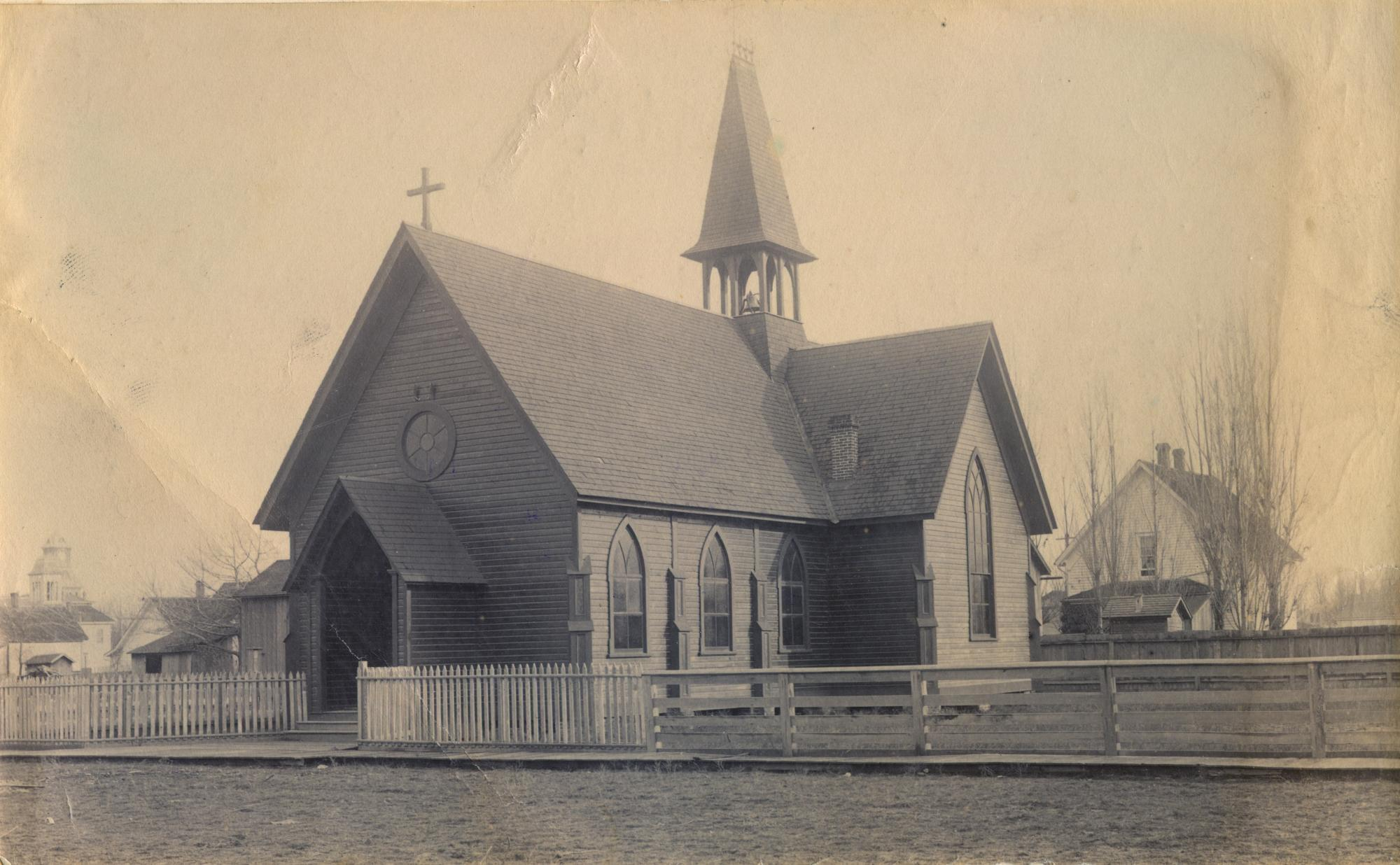
Good Samaritan Episcopal Church, 1895

In 1889, Wallis Nash, a lawyer from England who came to Corvallis to work on the railroad, constructed the area's first Episcopal church on the corner of Jefferson and 7th (later moved to Madison and 7th) using materials salvaged from the original school chapel. The same year, Bishop Benjamin Wistar Morris proposed to name it the Church of the Good Samaritan, and the vestry approved.

The building was designed in the Carpenter Gothic style. In 1960, after the congregation moved to a new facility, the original church was sold to the Elks and converted to secular use by the Corvallis Arts Center. In 1970, it was moved to a new location. In 1971, it was listed on the National Register of Historic Places.

=== New Location ===
In 1961, the Church of the Good Samaritan laid the cornerstone of a new church building on the corner of Harrison and 35th. In 1963, it began negotiations with artist Gabriel Loire of Chartres, France, for a series of stained-glass chapel windows expressing the church's commitment to healing; the project was funded in part by physicians in the parish. In 1968, the church contracted an additional 49 windows for the main sanctuary, entitled "The Revelation of Truth from God through Human Personality."
