= Foster G. McGaw =

American industrialist (1897–1986)

- Born: March 7, 1897; Hot Springs, North Carolina
- Died: April 16, 1986 (aged 89); Lake Forest, Illinois
- Known for: Founder of American Hospital Supply Corporation, Philanthropist

Foster G. McGaw (1897–1986) was a noted philanthropist who was particularly active in the Evanston, Illinois, and Northwestern University area. He founded the American Hospital Supply Corporation. AHSC was acquired by Baxter International in 1985, spun off as Allegiance Healthcare in 1996, and subsequently acquired by Cardinal Health in 1998. At the time of its founding, the AHSC was the largest medical supply company in the world.

== Biography ==
=== Early life ===
Foster G. McGaw was born in Hot Springs, North Carolina, while his father, Francis A. McGaw, was on a missionary trip to the area for his occupation as a Presbyterian minister. His mother, Alice Millar, was a music teacher. The family spent much of McGaw’s formative years in Keokuk, Iowa, where he attended grammar school and high school. At the age of 18, McGaw was approached by the owner of a surgical instrument company who offered him a job in Chicago. McGaw worked at this surgical instrument company for three years before enlisting in the United States Marine Corps in 1918. However, he soon returned to Chicago after one year to take a position at another medical supplies company as a salesman. After learning all about hospital supply buying trends and realizing that he was much more competent than his current employer, McGaw made the decision to leave the company and start his own enterprise.

=== Family and Children ===
McGaw’s first wife, Mary Harrison, died in 1919, shortly after he left the military. He married his second wife, Mary Wettling McGaw (née Vail), in June 1949. Mary Wettling had a son and daughter from her previous marriage. James D. Vail would eventually join the family business and work for McGaw’s company, the American Hospital Supply Corporation. Jeanne Vail would eventually become the namesake of Northwestern University’s Vail Chapel.

=== Career ===
McGaw began the American Hospital Supply Corporation in 1922; it would then become the industry leader in medical supply manufacturing and distribution throughout the World War II era. Based in Evanston, nearly 2,500 locals worked for the company by the 1970s. At its peak, sales reached around $150 million and AHSC sold to 95% of American hospitals. In 1985, Baxter Travenol Laboratories, now Baxter International, purchased the company for $3.8 billion.

=== Death ===
McGaw died of illness on April 16, 1986, in Lake Forest, Illinois. He was 89 years old. To celebrate McGaw, his wife created a scholarship program for his company, the American Hospital Supply Corporation; the scholarships offered financial aid to employees at his company.

== Philanthropy and legacy ==
Inspired by his missionary father, McGaw strove to be an active member of his local community and engaged in philanthropic activities around the Chicago metropolitan area. When asked about the biggest factor that contributed to his company’s success, he cited their “effort to give more than we get.” McGaw's name lives on after his death: he is recognized for his work in hospital supply through the Foster G. McGaw prize, and is also remembered for his multiple donations to schools in Illinois, especially Northwestern University, where he was on the board of trustees. In addition to his activity at Northwestern University, McGaw was an active member of the Evanston community. He was a director of the Evanston Presbyterian home and funded the construction of the Evanston YMCA.

=== Foster G. McGaw Prize ===
The Foster G. McGaw Prize was created in 1986, by the Baxter Allegiance Foundation and the American Hospital Association, the Foster G. McGaw Prize recognizes hospitals that have marked themselves as exemplary by improving the health and well-being of everyone in their communities. The award is set in the belief that the relationship between communities and hospitals is, and should be, different than any other organization. The award honors hospitals that show a commitment to bettering the environment of both the hospital and the community.

=== McGaw Medical Center ===
Named after McGaw for his large donations and commitment to medicine and located in downtown Chicago, the McGaw Medical Center serves as a top-ranked institution at the Northwestern University Feinberg School of Medicine. Chartered in 1966, the McGaw Medical Center "is an Illinois not-for-profit corporation that sponsors, administers, and supports graduate medical education". The center links the Northwestern University Feinberg School of Medicine to hospitals in Chicago and beyond and places students for their training.

=== McGaw Memorial Hall ===
In tribute to his father, Francis A. Mcgaw, Foster G. McGaw donated to the construction of McGaw Memorial Hall in 1953. It was built with the intent to hold the entire Northwestern student body, and had partitions, portable bleachers, and a removable basketball floor to allow for many different uses. At the time of construction, it was one of the largest auditoriums in the Chicago area. It lent its space to the North Shore Music Festival, and the Second Assembly of World Council of Churches, which showcased a convocation address by President Dwight D. Eisenhower. In 1983 the hall underwent renovations to suit the growing university’s needs, and the interior spaces of the building are now named Welsh-Ryan Arena and the Ronald J. Chinnock Lobby to recognize large contributors to the remodel.

=== McGaw YMCA ===
The Evanston YMCA was founded in 1885 to “promote mental, moral, physical and social welfare”. After a major donation from the Foster McGaw family, the Evanston YMCA was renamed the McGaw YMCA and continues to serve roughly 20,000 people in the community each year. The McGaw YMCA works to remind members of their core values: caring, honesty, respect, and responsibility. They promote growth in spirit, mind, and body and work closely with the city of Evanston to strengthen the community.
