= Coordinated care organization =

A coordinated care organization (CCO) is a community based, integrated care organization created by the state of Oregon to allow for local and regional distribution and coordination of healthcare to segments of the state's population covered under the Oregon Health Plan.

Its members are part of the Medicaid segment of the population and the CCO works with health care providers, hospitals, and local community groups to integrate healthcare services and contain cost increases through improved quality of care. CCOs were created through Oregon Senate Bill 1580.

CCOs have some very basic similarities with accountable care organizations (ACOs) but its major difference with ACOs are as follows. The Affordable Care Act (ACA) makes no provision for CCOs, there is no structured framework for them, are state developed, they might function as either a single organization or a network of providers, consumers do play a role in the governance of the organization, have a global budget with shared savings if certain quality measures are met, emphasis on preventative health but also on non-medical determinants of health (e.g. housing, food security, and transportation).
