= Pacific Christian Hospital =

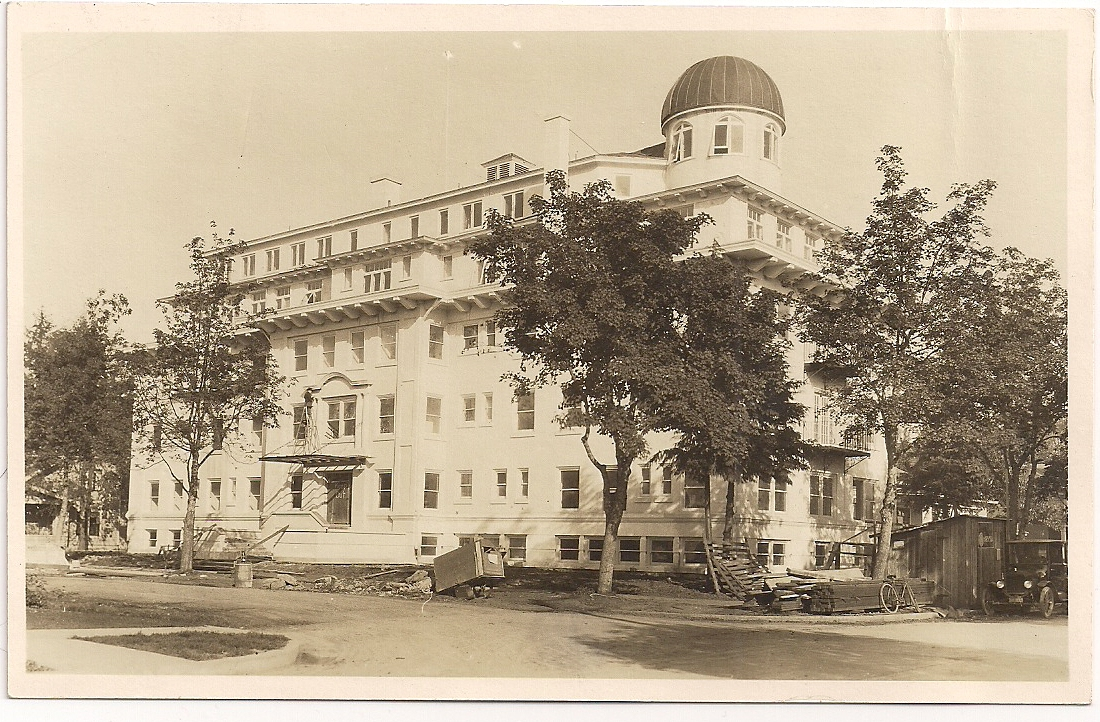
- Pacific Christian Hospital in 1924

Geography
- Location: Eugene, Oregon, United States

Organization
- Type: General
- Religious affiliation: International Bible Mission
- Affiliated university: Eugene Bible University

History
- Opened: March 17, 1924
- Closed: 1936

Links
- Lists: Hospitals in Oregon

Pacific Christian Hospital was a hospital in Eugene, Oregon, United States. It was opened by Eugene Bible University (EBU) and International Bible Mission (IBM) at East 12th and Hilyard streets on March 17, 1924. The person behind this enterprise was Eugene Claremont Sanderson, who founded Eugene Divinity School (EDS) in 1895 across Alder Street from the hospital.

EDS and EBU are now known as Bushnell University. The original hospital building was later remodeled and subsequently demolished. The facility is now known as PeaceHealth Sacred Heart Medical Center University District and is in the same location.

== Need and construction ==
There was a dire need for a good medical facility in Eugene in the early 1920s. Local citizens, because of Sanderson's reputation, looked to him to develop such a facility. In 1922, the EBU Board of Trustees authorized him to erect the hospital and conduct a fundraising campaign. Construction of the six-story building began in February 1923 and it was dedicated on March 16, 1924. The facility cost about $225,000 to build.

== Organization ==
In March 1928, Pacific Christian Hospital was incorporated as a separate entity, but it was still financially tied to EBU and IBM. It was composed of three institutions: the hospital itself; the former Catholic-run Mercy Christian Hospital on College Hill in Eugene, which was purchased in 1927 and rededicated to sanitarium work; and a hospital in Dodge City, Kansas which had exhausted its funds and was turned over to IBM in 1928. The other two facilities are long since closed.

== Nursing program ==
A nursing school at EBU was an integral part of the operation of the facility. A three-year program resulted in a degree as a registered nurse from EBU. The first class was admitted in 1925 and graduated in 1927. The last class graduated in 1929 with the remaining students transferring to hospitals in Portland, Oregon. The average class size was about 10.

== Creditors and sale ==
During the Great Depression, EBU and IBM found themselves overextended and needed to scale back operations to just the Eugene campus. Creditors had foreclosed on the hospital and a group of local doctors agreed to temporarily manage it until a buyer could be found. Thus, the hospital was sold to the Catholic order of the Sisters of St. Joseph of Newark for $50,000. It reopened on July 1, 1936 as Sacred Heart General Hospital with 75 beds and a staff of 35. The expanded and remodeled facility was the main hospital in Eugene until Sacred Heart Medical Center at Riverbend was opened in neighboring Springfield in 2008.
