= James A. Bushnell =

American businessman and banker (1826–1912)

James Addison Bushnell
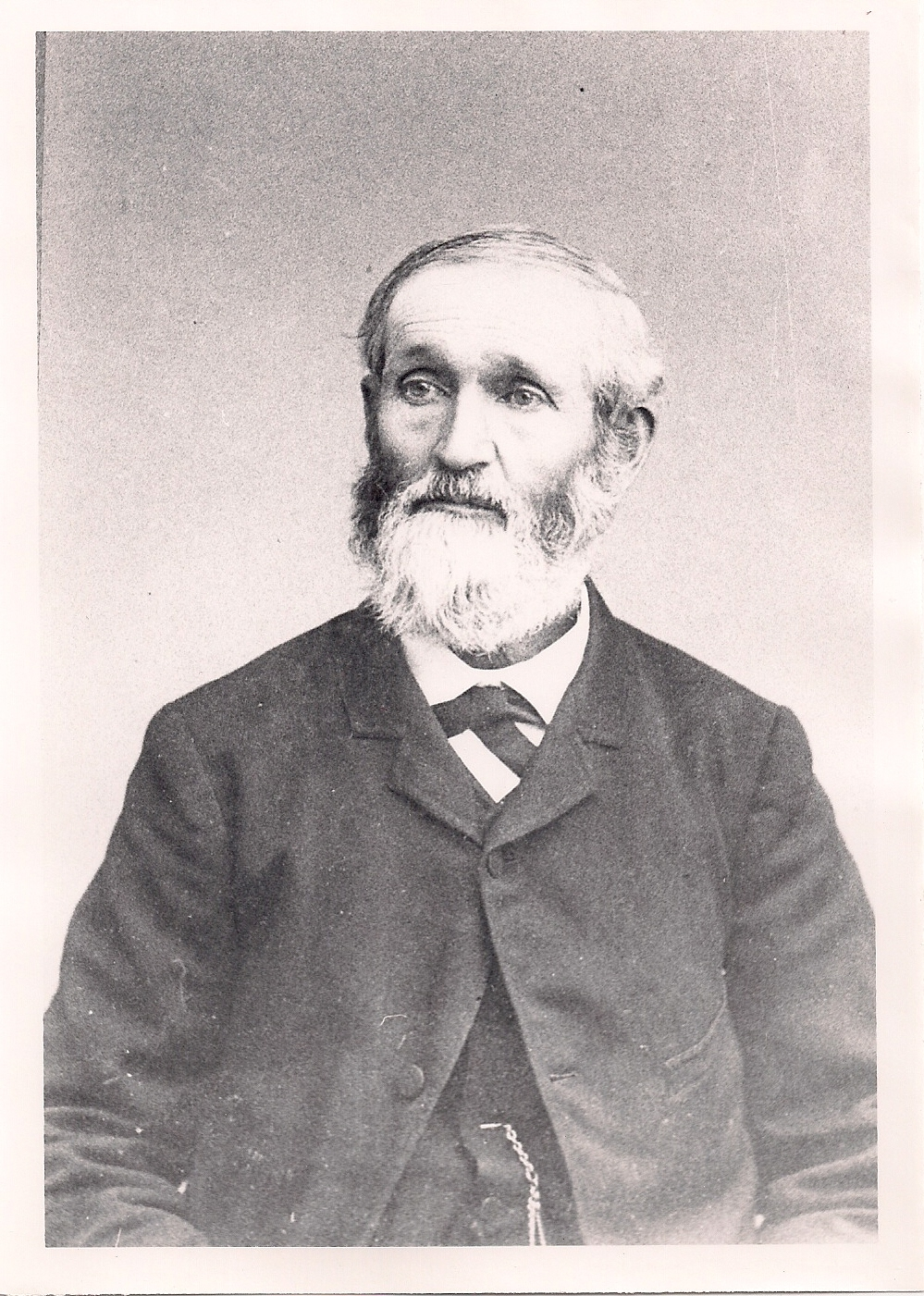
- Prominent Junction City, Oregon businessman and first president of the Board of Regents of Eugene Divinity School, Eugene, Oregon
- Born: July 27, 1826; New York, US
- Died: April 8, 1912 (aged 85); Junction City, Oregon, US
- Occupations: Businessman and Banker

James Addison Bushnell (July 27, 1826 – April 8, 1912) was an American businessman and banker from Junction City, Oregon. He also served as president of the Board of Regents of Eugene Divinity School (EDS) from 1895, when it was founded by Eugene Claremont Sanderson, until his death on April 8, 1912. It is now named Bushnell University in his honor. He was buried in Luper Pioneer Cemetery northwest of Eugene, Oregon.

== Travels to Oregon ==
Bushnell was born in New York on July 27, 1826. He crossed the plains in the spring of 1852 to Oregon and then on to California. He departed for home in July 1853 via ship from San Francisco and across Nicaragua to New York to Missouri to get his family, only to discover they had already left for Oregon. He then returned to Oregon via ship from New York across Panama, back to Portland where he joined them in Springfield in October 1853. Thus, he covered over 10,000 miles in less than 120 days. His first wife, Elizabeth C. Adkins, whom he married in September 1849 in Missouri and who died in January 1868 in Junction City, was part of the "Lost Wagon Train of 1853" that came over the Cascades via the Elliott Cutoff. He married his second wife, Sarah E. Page in April 1870.

== Business activities ==
He initially got a donation land claim of 320 acres near Clear Lake. In December 1855 he started the first school in that part of Lane County. In 1864, he expanded the farm to 800 acres. He settled in Junction City in 1875, where he operated a grain warehouse for 35 years. His historic Junction City house is still standing. Along with C. W. Washburne, he established the pioneer Farmers & Merchants Bank in 1893 and served as its president until his death in 1912. He also was president of the Junction City Hotel Company which built a half-block long brick hotel in 1891 that burned in 1915.

== Church involvement ==
He was an active member of the Christian Church, having been baptized in 1847. He helped establish the First Christian Church of Clear Lake in 1855. He also helped found the Church of Christ in Junction City in 1880 and was elder for many years. He served as vice president of the Oregon Christian Missionary Society and attended the annual Churches of Christ Convention in Turner, Oregon for many years.

== Eugene Divinity School ==
Bushnell was very active in helping Eugene Divinity School grow and be financially successful. He was involved in the meeting in May 1895 in Eugene when local Christian businessmen discussed with Eugene C. Sanderson the creation of EDS. When the Board of Regents was created in October 1895 he was elected the first Chairman. The school was established to prepare ministers for the Christian Church in the Pacific Northwest as part of the Stone-Campbell Restoration Movement. The school was located at East 11th Avenue and Alder Street next to the University of Oregon so students could take advantage of the liberal arts program there while EDS focused primarily on ministerial courses including theology, Bible, oratory, and music.

The first library at EDS was named the Bushnell Library. James and his wife Sarah provided $1,000 for Eugene C. Sanderson to purchase rare bibles when Sanderson took a leave of absence from 1910 to 1911 and traveled to Europe. The Sarah E. Bushnell Bible and Rare Book Collection, established in 1913, is still a prominent collection in what is now the Kellenberger Library at Northwest Christian University, successor to EDS.
