= Oskaloosa College =

Defunct American college

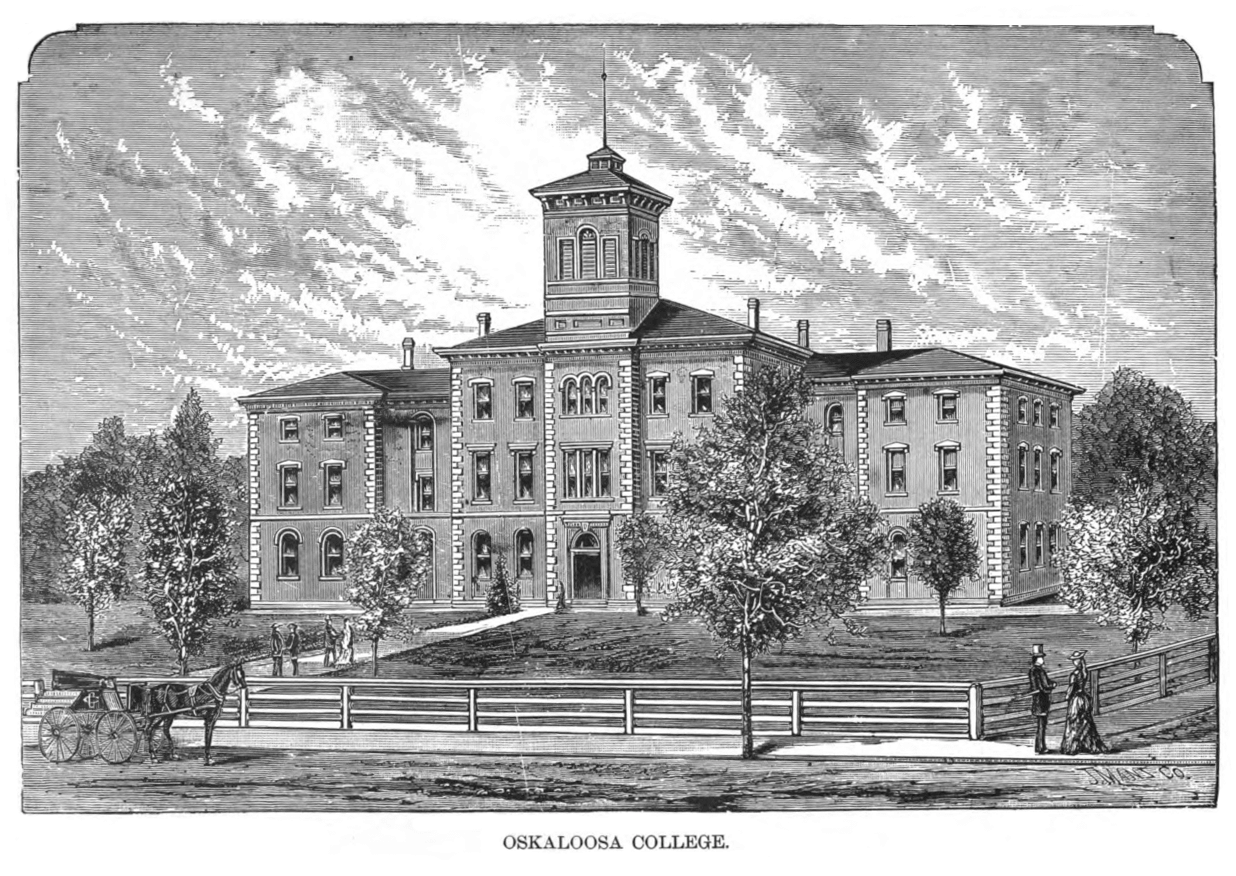
- Type: Private university
- Active: 1855–1898
- Affiliations: Christian Church (Disciples of Christ)
- Location: Oskaloosa, Iowa, United States

Oskaloosa College was a liberal arts college based out of Oskaloosa, Iowa that was in operation from 1861 to 1898. The college was incorporated in 1858 but the first classes were held in 1861. The school suffered financial hardship for much of its existence and closed in 1898.

== Establishment ==
Work was begun on establishing the college in 1855, under the influence of Aaron Chatterson and was affiliated with the Christian Church (Disciples of Christ).

The college was incorporated in 1858 but the first classes were not held until 1861.

Its first president was George T. Carpenter. Mary Bell Smith, who went on to become the president of the Kansas Woman's Christian Temperance Union, taught at Oskaloosa College, from 1863 to 1865.

== Decline ==
In 1881, all but one of the faculty left the college to start a new school in Des Moines, Iowa, which would later become Drake University; they were also joined by 47 (out of 300) students.

For a good portion of its history, the school endured severe financial hardship, which eventually led to its demise in 1898.

== Notable alumni ==
- Eleanor McWilliams Chamberlain, founder of Florida's suffrage movement
- George W. Clarke, 21st governor of Iowa from 1913 to 1917
- William Temple Hornaday, zoologist, conservationist, taxidermist, and author
- J. Howard Moore, zoologist, philosopher and educator
- Eugene Claremont Sanderson, Christian minister and founder of Eugene Divinity School (now Northwest Christian University)
- Isaac D. Young, U.S. Representative from Kansas
