= Mary Bell Smith =

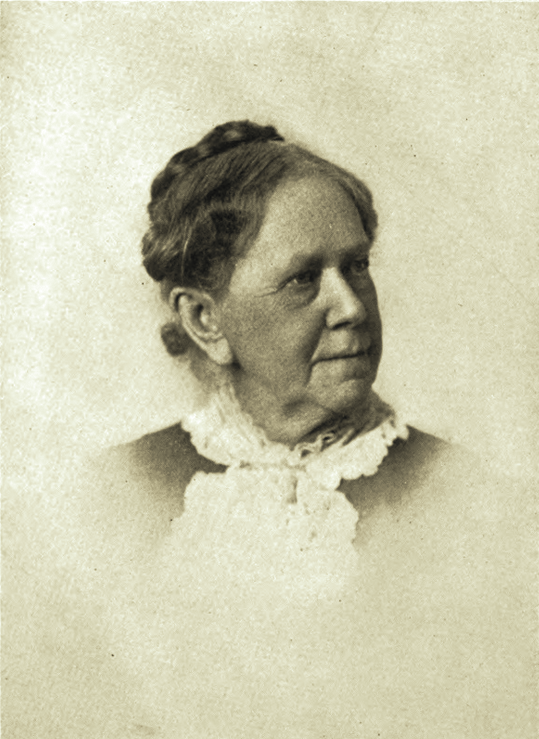
- Born: Mary Perkins Blair; August 3, 1818; Becket, Massachusetts, U.S.
- Died: December 9, 1894 (aged 76); Kansas City, Kansas, U.S.
- Occupations: Educator; social reformer; author
- Employers: Oskaloosa College; Patee Female College
- Notable work: My Uncle's Family, or Ten Months at the South
- Title: President, Kansas Woman's Christian Temperance Union
- Spouses: John Johnston Bell (m. 1836; died 1841); Daniel Smith (m. 1847; died 1879)
- Children: 4

Mary Bell Smith (née Blair; after first marriage, Bell; after second marriage, Smith; August 3, 1818 – December 9, 1894) was a 19th-century American educator, social reformer, and writer. Active in the early Women's Crusade movement, 1873, for many years, Smith was a prominent activist in the prohibition campaign in Kansas, as the organizer and president of the Woman's Christian Temperance Union (W.C.T.U.) in Topeka as well as serving as president of the Kansas state W.C.T.U. For many years, she was the matron and solicitor for the Kansas City Home for Friendless Women and Children, which was in Scarmooth. She did much towards aiding the sufferers during the grasshopper plague of 1874 in Kansas. She resided quite a long while in Wellington, Kansas after her second marriage, on a farm in the northwest part of the town which was once known as a depot of the Underground Railroad, by which fugitive slaves made their way to Canada before the end of the Civil War. Gray wrote for a woman's suffrage paper called The Lily. Amongst her printed writings was a book called Ten Months at the South, or My Uncle's Family. During the later part of her career, she devoted herself to painting, receiving pupils when she was well advanced in age. She had an ardent interest in tracing and recording her genealogical relations and left a valuable collection of family matters which her daughter, Mrs. Jennie J. Goodwin, completed.

== Early life ==
Mary Perkins Blair was born on August 3, 1818, in Becket, Massachusetts. Her parents were Luther Blair (1777–1851) and Emblem (née Perkins) Blair (1778–1852). She had 10 siblings.

In 1832, she and her family moved to Rochester, Ohio.

== Career ==
=== Ohio ===
At the age of 14, she commenced teaching at a school 5 miles (8.0 km) from her new home, going to and from her school on horseback, through the forest, guided by marked trees. She went on to be a teacher in the academy at Ashland, Ohio.

At Ashland, she met John Johnston Bell, a merchant, whom she married at the close of her school year in 1836. Mr. Bell was the son of William Bell and Hannah Johnston Bell, grandson of Colonel Robert Johnston and Hephzibah Tyler Bell Johnston, (fourth wife) of Newbury, Vermont. In 1837, Major Charles Johnston, of Newbury, Vermont, secured a large tract of government land in Wisconsin, and persuaded his three nephews, Charles, John and Robert Bell, to join him in his new enterprise. In a short time, all three families were living in their own cabins. In referring to those days of frontier life, Mrs. Bell said:—

"John taught me how to row, fish and shoot at the mark, for the Indians were still unfriendly, and he said it might be necessary for me to help him defend our cabin from straggling redskins. Notwithstanding all the danger that surrounded us we were very happy. Our time was spent much on the water, our boat being built to carry two; and with rifle for duck shooting and our fishing rods, with a well filled lunch basket, the summer days passed with seldom a cloud; but the winter proved a hard one even for that climate, and we decided to return to Ohio early in the coming autumn. The journey was taken by team in company with some friends, who like ourselves, thought a home in a more civilized country preferable to all the wild lands of Wisconsin."

On the return to Ohio, Mr. Bell was elected sheriff of Ashland County, Ohio before he became a merchant. His sudden death occurred soon after, in May, 1841.

Now widowed, Mrs. Bell took her young son and returned to her father's home, remaining until after the birth of a daughter some months later. During those months, she was kept from knowing the cause of her husband's death. On the night of his death, all books belonging to his store had been stolen, leaving the business in such a condition that the family feared there would be little, if anything, was left for Mrs. Bell.

She felt she could not be a burden to her parents, who generously offered herself and children a home. Teaching was out of the question at least at that moment. She decided to write to support herself and children as she had been praised from home papers for short articles written in earlier days. During these years of her widowhood, she not only wrote, but also painted, which brought pleasure, praise and substantial support in later years.

Bell was prominent among the temperance crusade workers of Ohio, in 1843, 1844, 1845 and 1846.

In the summer of 1847, she married Daniel Smith, a wealthy farmer who was widowed with three children. While shouldering the responsibilities associated with a large farm, she continued to write, being a regular contributor to the Advocate and Guardian, also The Lily, a paper devoted to woman's suffrage, a cause she was ever ready to defend and uphold.

Writing as "Mrs. M. B. Smith", she was the author of the popular Sunday school book, My Uncle's Family, or Ten Months at the South (American Reform Tract and Book Society, 1860). In 1863, the American Tract Society, of Cincinnati, Ohio, offered prizes for Sunday school books and Smith was one of the successful competitors.

Ellen Grant, or Who Was the Murderer, was among her best productions. It was a thrilling story in real life; the facts having been given her by her nephew, Luther Blair, who came from the south to the old home to die, that he might be laid in the family burial ground. This manuscript was lost on its way to the publisher. Every effort possible was made by the author to find it, but without avail. Some ten years later, a book was published which Mrs. Smith claimed was her lost manuscript. So slight were the changes made that she had no doubt of establishing her claim as the right author. To her great surprise it was claimed by the publisher as a story written expressly for him. Being in feeble health at the time, and finding that to secure her work it must be at the expense of a lawsuit, her physicians and friends advised her not to press her claims further, as the expense of a suit would be far more than she could realize out of the book. The loss of this work, which she had spent so much time in compiling, was always a great disappointment to her, and for many years she did not give up the idea that she would some day produce the story again in substance, if not in detail.

During her years of farm life, many fleeing slaves found shelter at the Smith farm house. Two daughters were born during these years. In speaking of her farm life to a friend after Mr. Smith's death; she said,—

"I did not realize how much those years of labor had taken out of my life until they were closed, and I again canvassed the different avenues open to me for the support of myself and family."

For some years, the widow remained in her home at Oberlin, Ohio where her daughters attended school, paying a portion of her expenses by taking boarders. The price of board however, was too small to meet the necessary expenses of a large family.

=== Iowa and Missouri ===
Selling her home, she removed to Newton, Iowa, where her son and daughter then lived, and remained a year. Finding the place too small for her work, she located in Oskaloosa, Iowa. In 1863, she was offered a position as teacher in the Oskaloosa College, which she accepted, still carrying on her art work at her home. Long hours of teaching brought on a severe illness; and in 1865, she was persuaded to give up her college work, and take a much needed rest with her children.

In 1867, she accepted the position as fine art teacher in Patee Female College in St. Joseph, Missouri. The college was supported principally by the south until the start of the civil war of 1861, after which the south had withdrawn their support, and the college was forced to close its doors in 1869.

In 1871, Smith was engaged by Prof. Dewey, of Des Moines, Iowa, to paint for him a geological panorama, 100 by 9 feet (30.5 m × 2.7 m). This was one of her greatest painting achievements. During the years of 1872 and 1873, much of her time was spent in art work.

=== Kansas ===
In 1874 and 1875, she was connected with the schools in Hutchinson, Kansas, and was an active worker during the grasshopper raid in that state.

Kansas established its W.C.T.U. in September, 1878, at a temperance meeting held in Bismarck Grove near Lawrence, Kansas. Smith was elected president at the first convention and she presided at the second convention, where Drusilla Wilson, a Quaker preacher, was elected her successor. In this role, Smith also had charge of Missouri and Nebraska. In 1880, she was elected superintendent of temperance headquarters at Topeka, Kansas. In 1887, she was elected matron of the Home of the Friendless at Leavenworth, Kansas, and through her influence many children were adopted. The long trial of the noted Hull baby case proved Smith's strength of character for truth, being offered many times money by the unscrupulous Carrie E. Hull if Smith would return to the home and persuade the home to give up the case. Great excitement prevailed, not only at Leavenworth, but all through the State of Kansas.

On leaving the home, much of her time was given to philanthropic work. In 1886, Smith spent some months in California. While there, she painted from nature some pieces in oil and pastel, which added much to her collection of fine arts. Her paintings brought her a fair price, and as she would often say,—

"I never saw the time that I could not help the needy who came in my way."

Her later life was spent with her daughters, with an occasional visit to relatives, always leaving in their homes some tokens of her artwork. She completed the Blair genealogy record to her father's family for the Blair genealogy (being compiled by order of Wm. Blair of Chicago) by Miss Emily Leavitt of Boston, Massachusetts. The compiling of the family record was left to her daughter, Mrs. Goodwin, with the request that there should be no partiality shown in the record of her family.

== Personal life ==
Mary Perkins Blair married (1) at Rochester, Ohio, in 1836, John Johnston Bell (Newbury, Vermont, June 19, 1808 – May 1841), a son of William Bell and grandson of Colonel Robert Johnston of Newbury. She married (2) at Oberlin, Ohio, July 1, 1847, Daniel (Sandisfield, Massachusetts, February 27, 1799 – 1879), son of Joel and Nancy Smith.

Children of Mary P. and John J. Bell:

- George Washington Bell, born in Ashland, Ohio, June 19, 1839
- Jennie Johnston Bell, born in Rochester, Ohio, December 19, 1841

Children of Mary P. Bell and Daniel Smith:

- Mary M. Smith, born in Wellington, Ohio, October 5, 1849
- Amanda Smith, born in Wellington, March 4, 1854,

Smith was a charter member of the Daughters of the American Revolution (D.A.R.).

Mary Perkins Blair Bell Smith died in Kansas City, Kansas, December 9, 1894.

== Selected works ==
- My Uncle's Family, or Ten Months at the South (1860)
- On the quicksands (1897)
- A terrible tangle
- Her son's wife
- Little Bessie
- Poor Nell
- The tramp's daughter
- Two wives
- Were they married?
