= PeaceHealth Sacred Heart Medical Center University District =

Coordinates: 44°2′45″N 123°4′55″W

- PeaceHealth

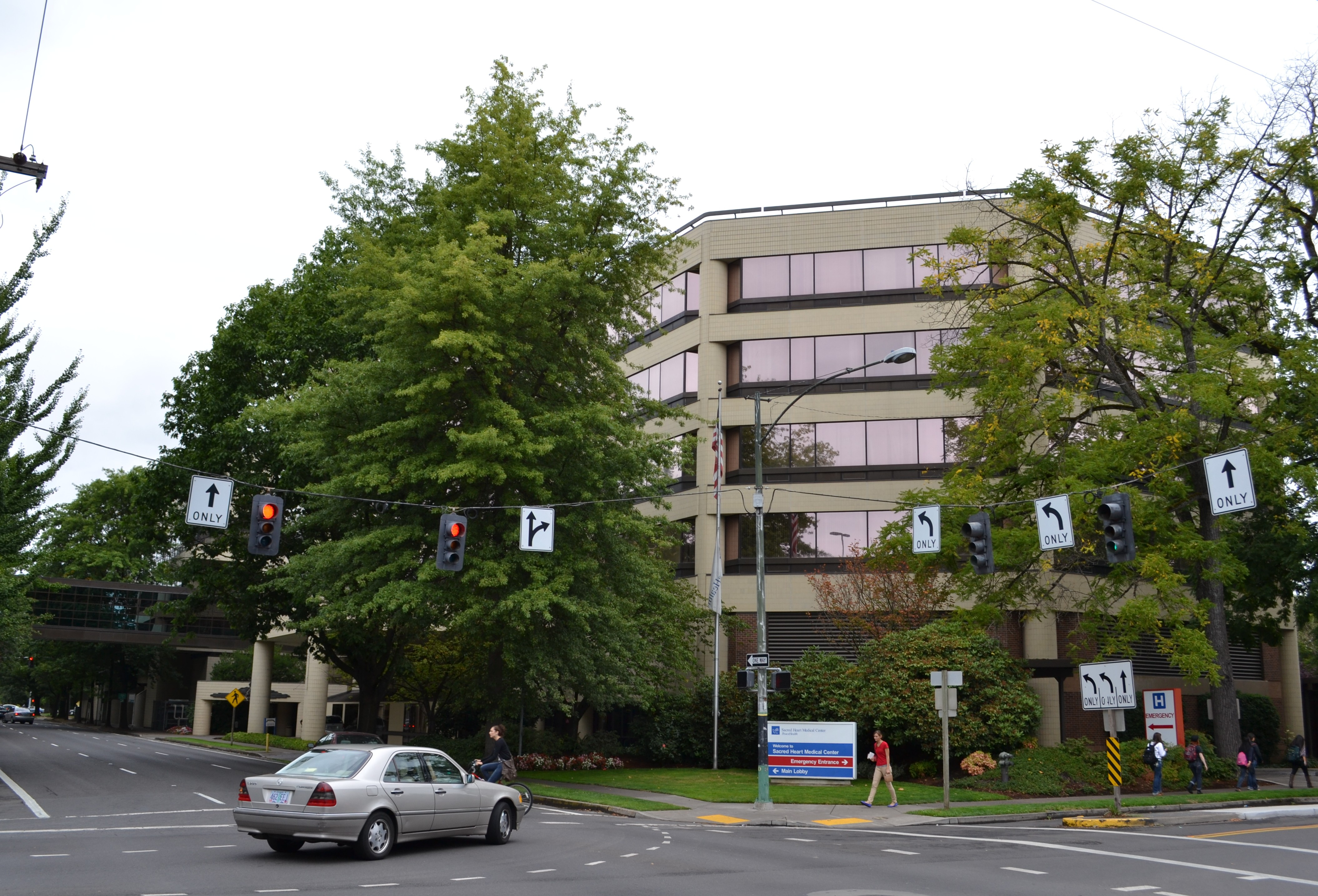
- Main building in 2011

Geography
- Location: 1255 Hilyard Street, Eugene, Oregon, United States

Organization
- Care system: Private, non-profit
- Type: Specialized

Services
- Emergency department: Closed 2023
- Beds: 0

History
- Founded: 1936

Links
- Website: www.peacehealth.org/locations/eugene
- Lists: Hospitals in Oregon

PeaceHealth Sacred Heart Medical Center University District is a former hospital in Eugene, Oregon, United States. Originally called Sacred Heart Medical Center, the newer name reflected its location near the University of Oregon and Bushnell University. It was one of two Sacred Heart facilities in the Eugene-Springfield area owned by PeaceHealth. The other facility, Sacred Heart Medical Center at RiverBend, is in Springfield and is still open.

Sacred Heart in Eugene was once the largest hospital in the area until a newer facility at RiverBend opened in August 2008. Most general services moved to this larger hospital. The University District facility became a specialty services hospital with an emergency department. Said emergency department and general patient rooms closed in 2023, with remaining services concluded as of February 2024. Demolition of the building began in March of 2026.

== History ==
Sacred Heart Medical Center in Eugene began as Pacific Christian Hospital, which was founded by Eugene Bible University, now Bushnell University and dedicated on March 16, 1924. The building was six stories tall and cost about $225,000. A School for Nurses was a part of the University and associated with the hospital. By the 1930s, it was in bad shape structurally and financially. At the same time, the Sisters of St. Joseph of Newark, which later became Sisters of St. Joseph of Peace, had a good reputation in the Pacific Northwest in hospital administration. Due to this reputation, local physicians went to them for help in saving the hospital. In 1936, the Sisters of St. Joseph bought it for $50,000 and changed its name to Sacred Heart General Hospital.

== Expansions ==
The original building was expanded in 1941 with the addition of 100 beds. Another 100 bed expansion took place in 1951 bringing capacity to 262 beds. In 1965, the facility was expanded again to 366 beds total. This last expansion included a new emergency room, a new maternity department, and a new intensive care department. The old Pacific Christian Hospital building was now gone. A 30-bed psychiatric unit was completed in 1969. In 1972, further additions were completed including a new ancillary building with new surgical units. In 1982, the hospital was again expanded along with adjacent physicians buildings.

In the early 2000s, the hospital needed to expand again but could not because of the surrounding buildings. Thus, PeaceHealth decided to build a new facility. After much searching and discussions around the community, the new hospital was located in neighboring Springfield, Oregon in what is now known as the Riverbend area. In 2014, PeaceHealth completed a renovation of the University District facility and greatly expanded the Johnson Behavioral Health inpatient unit.

== School of Nursing ==
The only nursing school outside of Portland, Oregon was started in 1942 by the hospital to meet wartime needs. In 1965, the three-year diploma program had 150 students. It was phased out in 1970 and transferred to the Lane Community College.

== See also ==
- List of hospitals in Oregon
