= Eugene Masonic Cemetery =

Cemetery in Oregon, USA

- Masonic Cemetery and Hope Abbey Mausoleum
- U.S. National Register of Historic Places
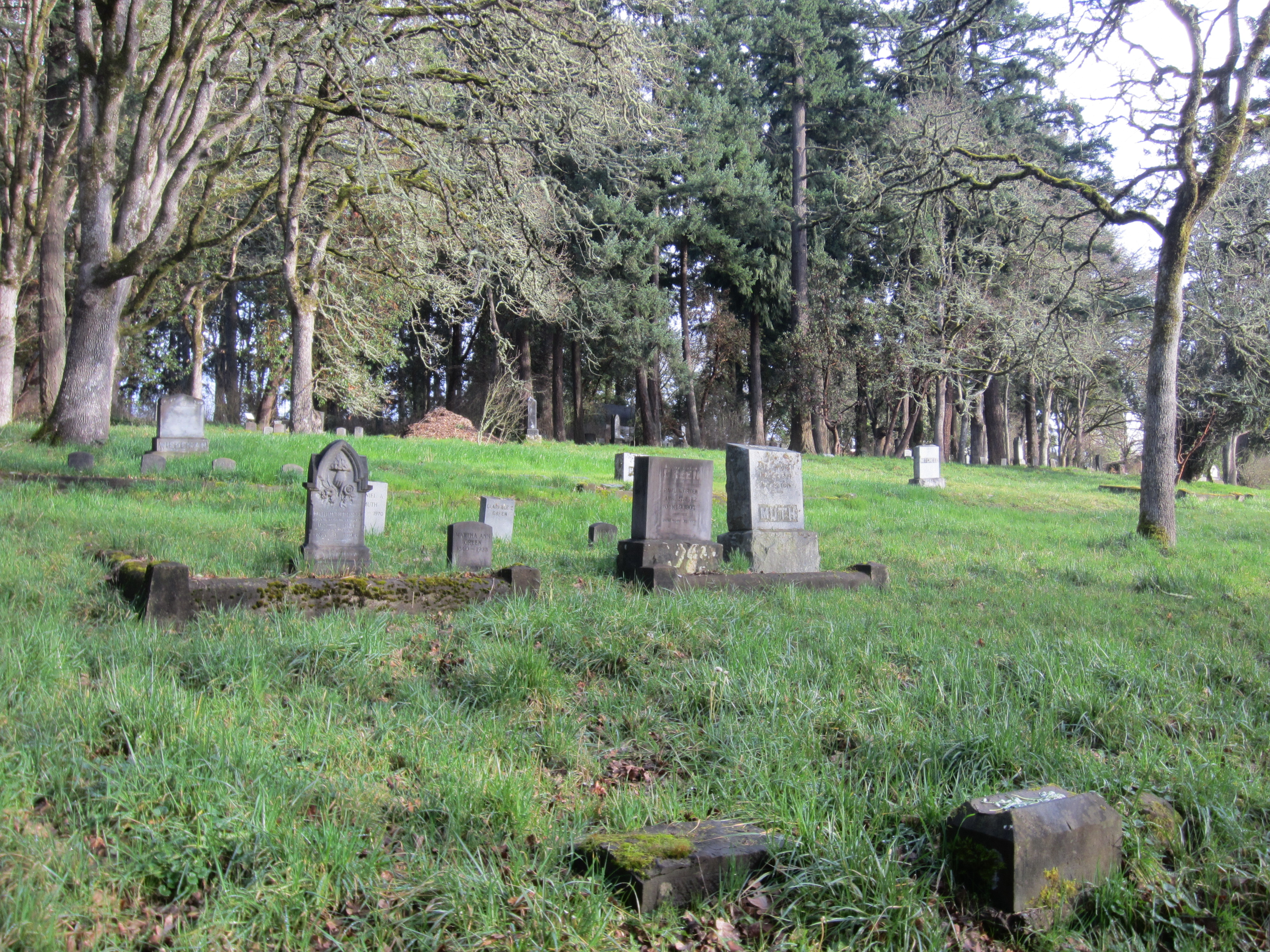

- Location within Oregon Location within the United States
- Location: 25th and University Sts., Eugene, Oregon
- Coordinates: 44°1′53″N 123°4′24″W
- Area: 10.1 acres (4.1 ha)
- Built: 1859
- Architect: Lawrence, Ellis F.; Portland Mausoleum Co.
- Architectural style: ancient Egyptian
- NRHP reference No.: 80003336
- Added to NRHP: September 15, 1980

Eugene Masonic Cemetery is a historic cemetery in Eugene, Oregon, United States. It is the oldest chartered cemetery in Eugene, and is one of the oldest privately owned and continuously operating historic entities in Lane County. It was incorporated as a burial site in 1859, the same year Oregon became a state. As was the custom at the time, prominent citizens of Eugene City asked a local fraternal organization—in this case, the Freemasons—to establish a city "bury ground" open to all. The Masons purchased ten acres on a knoll about two miles from the town center and laid out the cemetery with its main entrance at what is now the intersection of University Street and 25th Avenue.

In 1994, cemetery ownership passed from the Masons to the non-profit Eugene Masonic Cemetery Association, whose board members are volunteers. The EMCA retains "Masonic" in the cemetery's name as an important historic reference, but it is no longer officially affiliated with Freemasonry. The cemetery contains Hope Abbey Mausoleum which, together with the cemetery itself, was placed on the National Register of Historic Places in 1980.

== History ==
The cemetery was established on a treeless hill in the country outside Eugene. For many years it was one of the principal resting places chosen for Eugene's prominent citizens, several of whom are listed below. Through many generations and in varying conditions, it was managed by the local Masonic Lodge, but eventually, the load became too much, and the site, overrun by weeds and blackberries and subject to vandalism, became a matter of public concern. The City of Eugene, with cooperation from the Masonic Lodge, began a process that resulted in the transfer of ownership to a new Eugene Masonic Cemetery Association (EMCA).

The association's immediate goal was to reverse generations of neglect, and its primary aim remains the rehabilitation and interpretation of this historic resource. Since 1994, the EMCA has largely restored the native and heritage landscape of the cemetery. Over $300,000 has been invested in the rehabilitation and improvement of Hope Abbey Mausoleum and the repair of hundreds of damaged historic tombstones. The goal of historic interpretation has resulted in the production of a book, Full of Life, numerous brochures, and over 50 interpretive signs on site.

== The site ==
Originally treeless and, like the valley floor, covered with prairie grasses and wildflowers, the cemetery is now dominated by a mature stand of Douglas-fir trees, together with a wide variety of understory species. One of the EMCA's first acts was the development of a landscape plan, which emphasized the cultivation of native plants—more than 100 native species of plants can be found in the cemetery—and the preservation of the site's unique qualities. In 2006, the Eugene Tree Foundation presented its award for excellence in stewardship of an urban forest to the EMCA. In 2023, ArbNet accredited the cemetery as a Level 1 arboretum. Mowing is limited, to allow the native plants to flourish and provide an uninterrupted display, as well as to protect ground-nesting birds.

The cemetery was initially platted in a formal grid with streets and alleys. Numerous family plots, measuring 20×20 feet and subdivided into ten lots, were purchased by pioneer subscribers for $15 apiece. Over the years, the Eugene Masonic Cemetery has remained an active cemetery, and even today a limited number of in-ground burial spaces are still available. Two scatter gardens for burial of cremated remains have been created, and three Jewish sections of the cemetery have been defined and consecrated.

Over fifty historic markers describing notable early and recent notable Eugeneans are maintained near gravesites. An on-site bulletin board is provided, with informational brochures, including maps for walking tours, and Hope Abbey is a venue for occasional lectures and musical performances.

== Hope Abbey ==
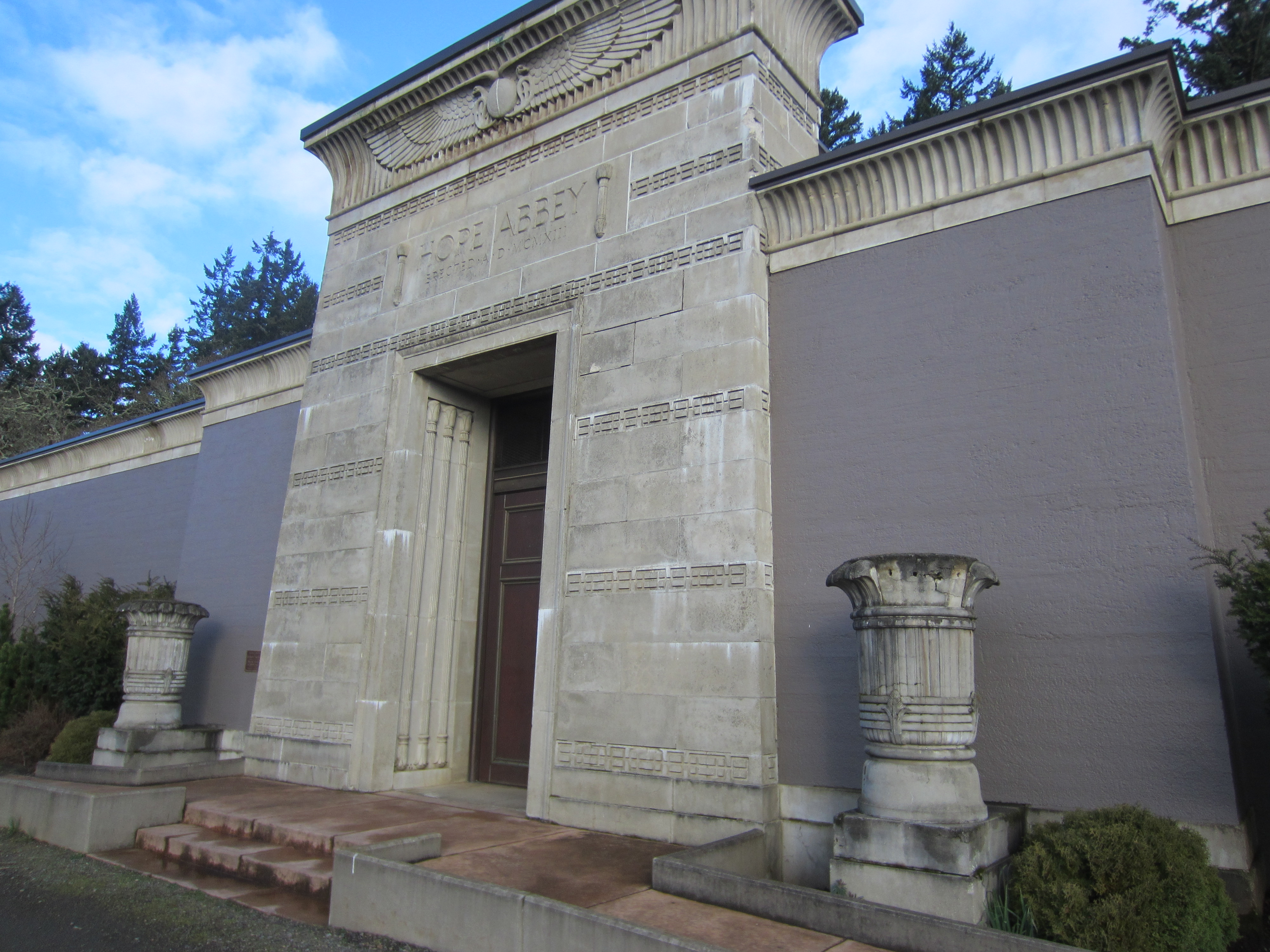
Hope Abbey

Hope Abbey, in the southwest corner of the cemetery, is a mausoleum that was designed in the Egyptian Revival style by Ellis F. Lawrence and dedicated on June 14, 1914. Its distinctive architecture includes a massive entrance archway, with lotus blossom urns and bundles of papyrus on either side of the copper-clad doors. Details include ancient Egyptian symbols above the entrance: the circular disc representing the sun, twin cobras denoting death, and vulture wings symbolizing protection and maternal care.

The idea for a mausoleum at the cemetery was proposed in 1912 by the Portland Mausoleum Company, which also constructed Mount Crest Abbey in Salem's City View Cemetery and numerous other mausoleums in Oregon. The Masons contracted with the company to build a 250-crypt mausoleum for $40,000. Most of the crypts were sold by 1926. Portland Mausoleum Company went out of business in 1929, and there was neither enough money in the endowment fund, nor any inventory of crypts left for the Masons to sell to raise funds. The building fell into serious disrepair due to this lack of funds, and during the period of the mausoleum's deterioration, some families moved their loved ones to other local cemeteries.

Since 1995, Hope Abbey has been largely rehabilitated and updated. A new roof, proper drainage, a wheelchair-accessible front porch, electrical service, and a working lavatory are among the improvements. The eighty glass clerestory windows that had been bricked up as protection against vandalism have been reopened and reproduction stained glass windows by local glass artisan John Rose allow sunlight to once again illuminate the interior. Additional work, including extensive marble repair and replacement, as well as structural repairs, has continued as funds have permitted. The history of the mausoleum has been extensively researched and has been used to guide its rehabilitation after years of neglect. It was placed on the National Register of Historic Places in 1980.

Hope Abbey, with crypt and niche interment rights still available for purchase, is normally kept secure and locked, but the huge doors are opened to the public from 1 to 4 p.m. on the last Sunday of each month except December, as well as on special occasions such as Memorial Day weekend or for musical events, including the summer Music To Die For series.

== People ==
City founder Eugene Skinner and Oregon's first governor, John Whiteaker, are buried in the cemetery, as are many Civil War veterans. Other notable people interred there include mayor Ruth Bascom and several presidents of the University of Oregon (UO) and Northwest Christian College (now Bushnell University). Many notable Eugenians are also entombed in Hope Abbey. The ECMA maintains a searchable burial database on its website.

=== Notable burials ===
- Ruth Bascom (1926–2010), mayor of Eugene and bicycle advocate
- Prince Lucien Campbell (1861–1925), fourth president of the UO (in Hope Abbey)
- Robert D. Clark (1910–2005), eleventh president of the UO
- Thomas Condon (1822–1907), geologist and professor at the UO
- Edward A. Geary (1892–1974), 47th speaker of the Oregon House of Representatives
- John Wesley Johnson (1836–1893), first president of the UO
- Maude Kerns (1876–1965), artist and art educator
- Lord Nelson Roney (1853–1944), builder
- Eugene Claremont Sanderson (1859–1940), founder of Eugene Divinity School (now Bushnell University)
- Eugene Skinner (1809–1864), founder and namesake of Eugene
- John Whiteaker (1820–1902), first governor of Oregon

== Organization ==
The Eugene Masonic Cemetery Association is a non-profit 501(c)(3) organization with a Board of Directors, a cemetery administrator, and a site manager. Money raised for the restoration and operation of the cemetery totals well over $1 million. Both a general endowment and a landscape endowment have been established. Work is also accomplished through matching grants, in-kind business contributions, pro bono professional help, and hundreds of volunteer hours. It is the largest cemetery restoration project in Oregon and is considered a model throughout the state.

== See also ==
- Pioneer cemetery
