= E. R. Moon =

Missionary to Belgian Congo

E. R. (Everard Roy) Moon
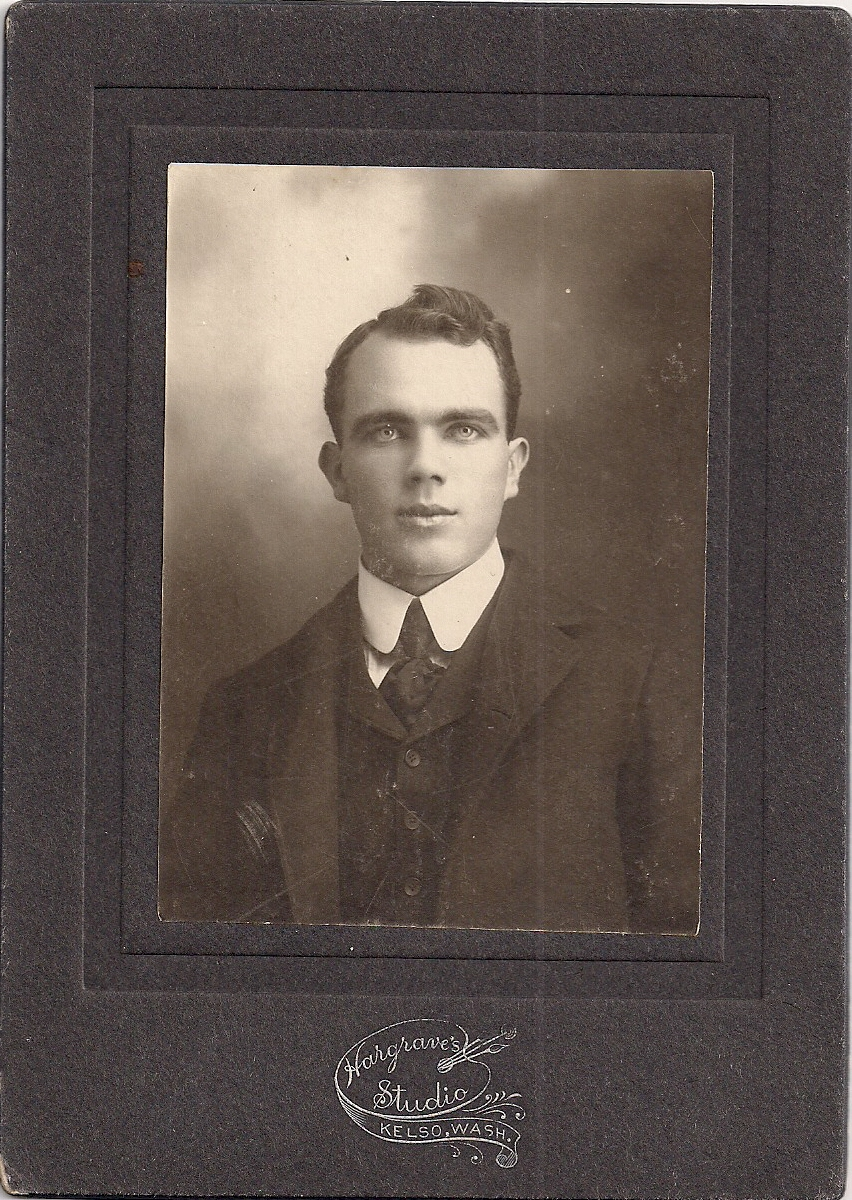
- Christian Missionary to the Belgian Congo
- Born: February 24, 1879; Beloit, Kansas, USA
- Died: November 16, 1962 (aged 83); Springfield, Oregon, USA
- Education: Eugene Divinity School, Eugene, Oregon
- Occupations: Christian Missionary and university professor

Everard Roy "E.R." Moon was an American Christian missionary who served at Bolenge and later Mondombe in the Belgian Congo from 1908 to 1923. He was a 1903 graduate of Eugene Divinity School (EDS), now Bushnell University in Eugene, Oregon.

E. R. was born in Beloit, Kansas, on February 24, 1879, and moved to Oregon as a young boy. He died in Springfield, Oregon, on November 16, 1962. He married his first wife, Eva Huntington, on September 7, 1904, at Castle Rock, Washington, but she died on March 3, 1907, in Nezperce, Idaho. His second wife was Bessie L. Huntington, his sister-in-law, who he married in June 1908, also at Castle Rock. She was actively engaged with him in his missionary work. She was born on November 17, 1887, in Castle Rock and died in Turner, Oregon, on April 17, 1985.

== Call to serve ==
E.R. Moon served as pastor, first at Castle Rock, then in Idaho before returning to Castle Rock.

For their honeymoon, E. R. and Bessie Moon attended the Oregon Convention of Christian Churches in Turner in 1908, where they heard Royal J. Dye talk about the need for missionaries to the Congo. E.R. asked his wife and she responded, "It looks like a direct call to us." They were accepted and departed for the Congo in November 1908.

Both Dr. Moon and his wife became fluent in the native Lonkundo language. He translated portions of the Bible into that language. E. R. Moon was an accomplished hunter and builder. He repaired many of the buildings and built several new ones at Logombe. At the new mission at Mondombe, some 500 miles (800 km) upriver from Logombe, he erected all of the buildings, including a brick church, starting in 1920. He taught native men construction trades. His wife taught the natives in day schools, translated numerous books into the native languages, and managed the orphanage. Their three children, Jesse, Eleanor, and David, were all born in the Congo. They had two year-long furloughs and were to return to the U.S., first on the RMS Titanic and the second time on the RMS Lusitania. Fortunately they missed both ships, the first time because E. R. was stuck on a sandbar, and the second time because the family was quarantined in Belgium. Jesse and later Eleanor were raised by their maternal grandparents in Washington while their parents were in the Congo.

== S.S. Oregon ==
At the same time as the Moons accepted the call to serve, a plea went out for funds to purchase a boat to provide transportation for the missionaries on the Congo River. Prior to that, the missionaries had used dugout canoes. The Oregon churches took up this call and raised the funds for the boat, which was built by Tom Rees and Sons, shipbuilders in Pittsburgh, Pennsylvania. It was assembled and dedicated in October 1909 at the centennial celebration of the Disciples of Christ Church. It was then taken apart and transported in 1,200 different packages by ship and narrow-gauge railway to Kinshasa, on Stanley Pool, in Africa where the British Baptist Mission Society had a station. E. R. Moon had training as a carpenter and, along with Robert Wilson, assembled the S. S. Oregon from June to October 1910. It was a wood-burning, shallow-draft sternwheel river steamer that was 90 feet (27 m) long and had an 18-foot (5.5 m) beam. It had a steel hull that contained about 20,000 rivets. It had a main deck and one upper deck. The native name for the steamship was Nsang'ea ndoci, which means "Good News", appropriate for a missionary undertaking.

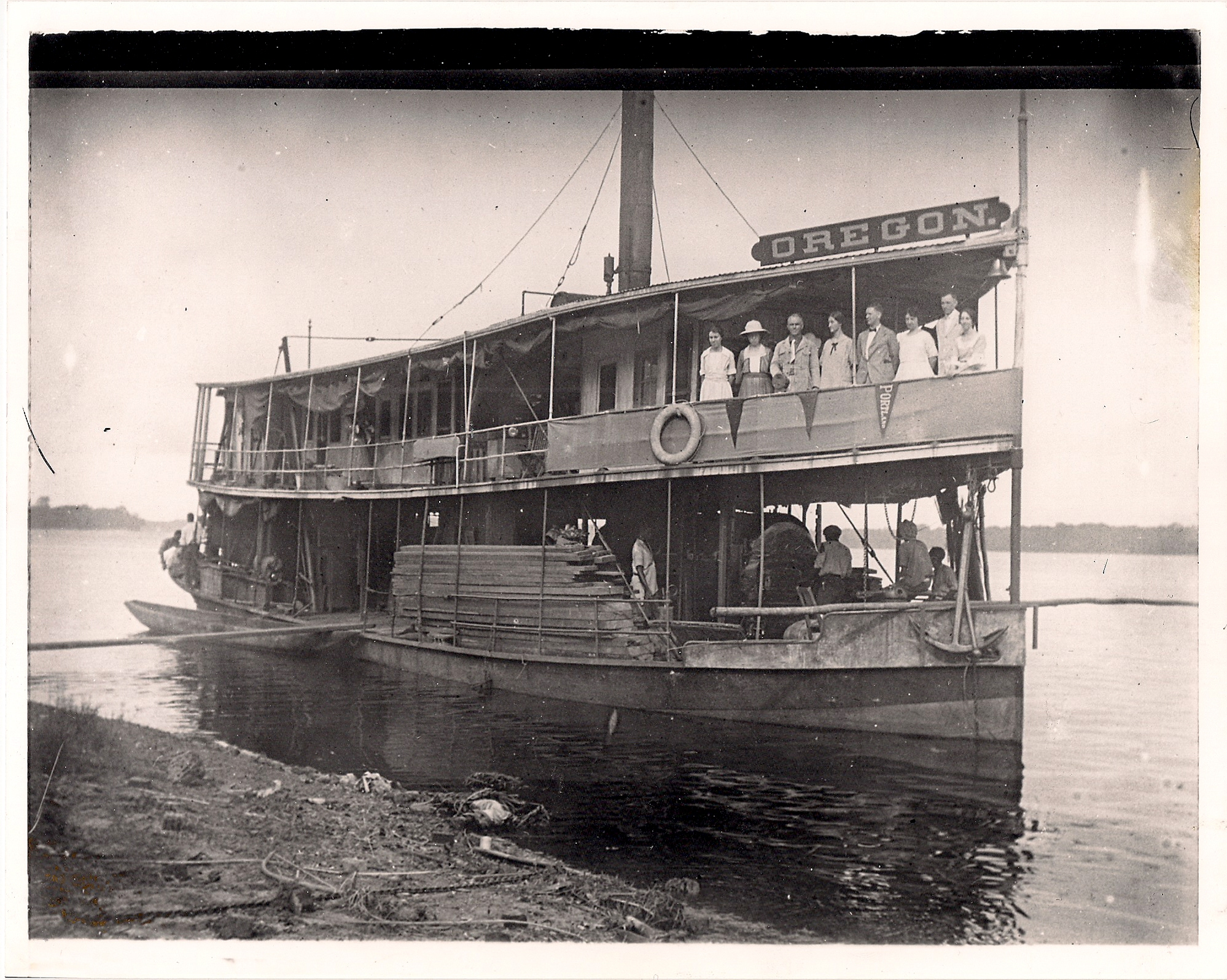
SS Oregon on the Congo River - E. R. Moon is third from left, his wife Bessie is second from left.

E. R. Moon was the first captain. In 1917 a young native and former slave, John Inkima, started work on the S. S. Oregon; he became captain in 1920 and stayed for almost 30 years. The ship was remodeled in 1935, and a partial third deck added. The steamship continued to serve the missions until it was sold in 1950. The bell from the S. S. Oregon is now housed at the Disciples of Christ Historical Society in Nashville, Tennessee.

As part of the effort to expand the missionary field in the Congo, an expedition was undertaken as authorized by the Missionary Conference at Bolenge in May 1916. The expedition lasted for 162 days from late May to early November 1816. Four missionaries, E. R. Moon, W. A. Frymire, E. A. Johnston, and W. R. Holder, were given the commission for this expedition. They made use of the S. S. Oregon for much of the journey up two tributaries of the Congo River: the Ubangi and the Ngiri. They mapped the rivers, collected information on the various tribes, and developed an action plan for expansion of missionary activity.

== I Saw Congo ==
This book, published in 1952, after E. R. Moon retired from active service, recounts his 15 years experiences as a missionary in the Belgian Congo. Written in the first person, it starts with his and Bessie's arrival off the coast of Africa and concludes with their return to the United States. Throughout he talks about his adventures and relations with the natives. He also discusses the flora and fauna of the area. Apparently he became a pretty proficient hunter to provide food for the villages he visited.

The book is organized as follows:

- Foreword
- A Twelve Thousand Mile Honeymoon Trip
- Part One - River and Jungle Trail
  - Chapter I - Steamboat on the Congo
  - Chapter II - The Game Trail
  - Chapter III - Snakes, Fish, Insects
- Part Two - Congo Village Life
  - Chapter I - The Congo Village
  - Chapter II - Marriage Customs and Names
  - Chapter III - Language and Communication
  - Chapter IV - Folk-Songs, Proverbs, Fables
- Part Three - Congo's Old and New Faiths
  - Chapter I - Old Beliefs and Practices
  - Chapter II - A New Faith Takes Root
  - Chapter III - A Mission Station is Opened
- Sunset or Dawn?

The book provides a glimpse of village life and describes many of the customs of the natives at the time. His particular attention to the language is important because he translated sections of the Bible into the native language. The third part focuses on issues related to his mission - spreading the Christian message. This is set in the context of the native religion. This section also describes how he and his wife opened up the new station at Mondombe.

== Later activities ==
After his time in Africa, E. R. Moon served as a professor at the College of Missions in Indianapolis, Indiana, from 1924 to 1929 and then as a professor in the College of Religion at Butler University from 1929 to 1933. From 1933 to 1938 he pastored various churches in Indiana and was then called to Jamaica from 1938 to 1944. After that they settled in Springfield, Oregon. Moon was a frequent speaker on his Congo experiences at various Christian churches.

== Academic background ==
He received a Bachelor of Oratory (BO) degree in 1903 and a Bachelor of Arts (BA) degree in 1906, both from Eugene Divinity School; a Bachelor of Divinity (BD) degree in 1918 and a Doctor of Divinity (DD) degree in 1924, both from Eugene Bible University; and finally a Master of Arts (MA) degree in 1926 from the College of Missions.

== Awards and honors ==
He was made a Fellow of the Royal Geographical Society of London in 1927 and was awarded the Royal Order of Lion by the King of Belgium for his explorations on the Congo River.
