= St. Joseph Female College =

Former private college in Missouri, U.S.

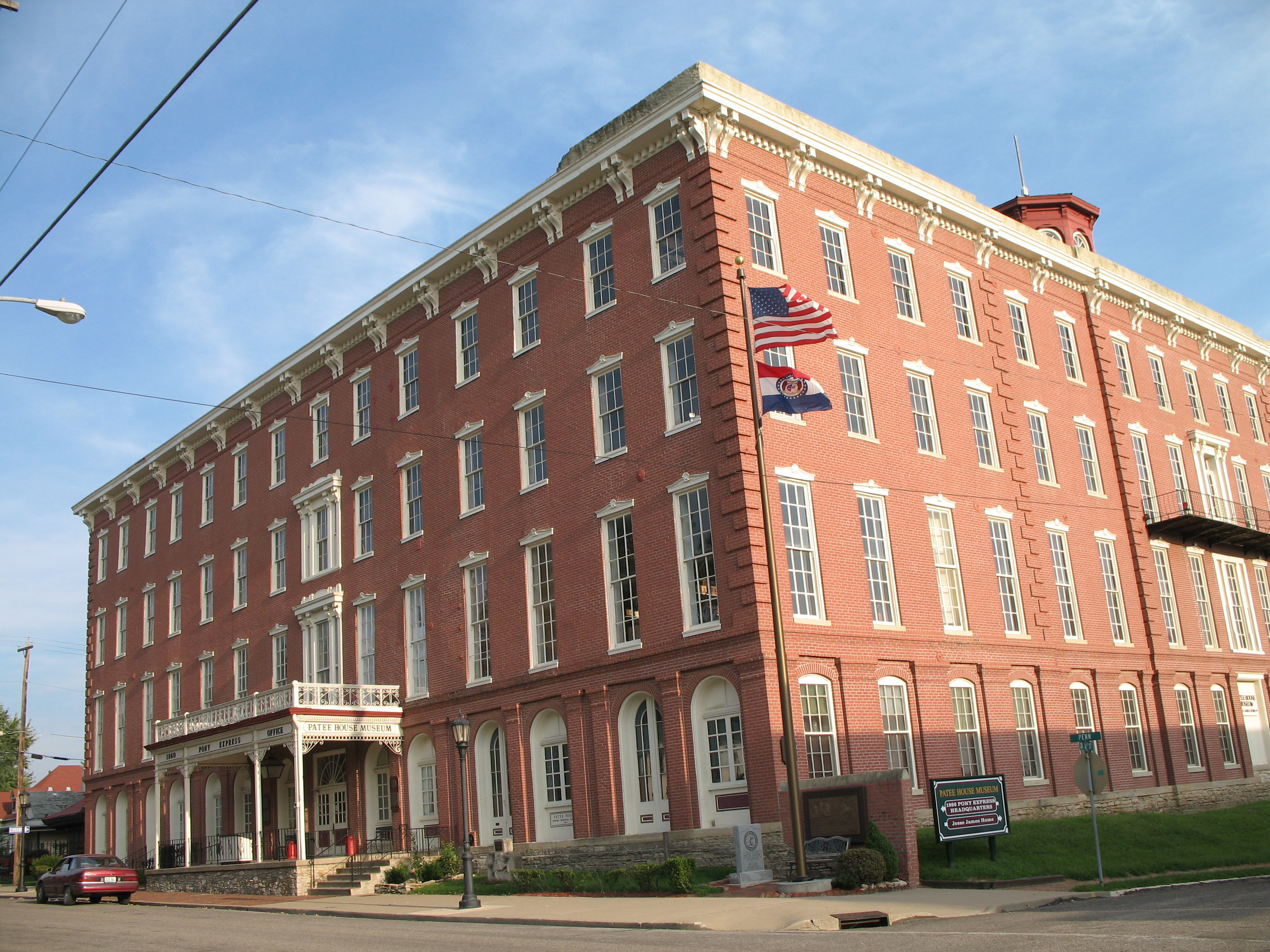
- Type: Private Baptist women's college
- Active: 1875–1881
- President: Rev. Elijah S. Dulin
- Location: (United States) St. Joseph, Missouri, USA

St. Joseph Female College was a private women's college located in St. Joseph, Missouri, United States.

Affiliated with the Baptist Church, St. Joseph Female College was opened in 1875 by the English-born Rev. Elijah S. Dulin. The college was located for most of its operating years in the Patee House, a hotel and office building. It had previously housed the Patee Female College from 1865 to 1868.

Patee House has historically been most commonly associated with the founding of the Pony Express in 1860, and the death of outlaw Jesse James nearby in 1882.

The college moved out of Patee House in 1880 and constructed its own building at a cost of $100,000 on a hill near the city's center. According to The Baptist Encyclopedia, the board of trustees was composed of the state's leading men, with Rev. Dulin serving as president throughout the college's life.

St. Joseph Female College formally closed in 1881.

In 1980 Patee House was designated a National Historical Landmark, for its use as headquarters of the innovative Pony Express.

== See also ==
- List of current and historical women's universities and colleges in the United States
