= Eugene Claremont Sanderson =

Eugene C. Sanderson
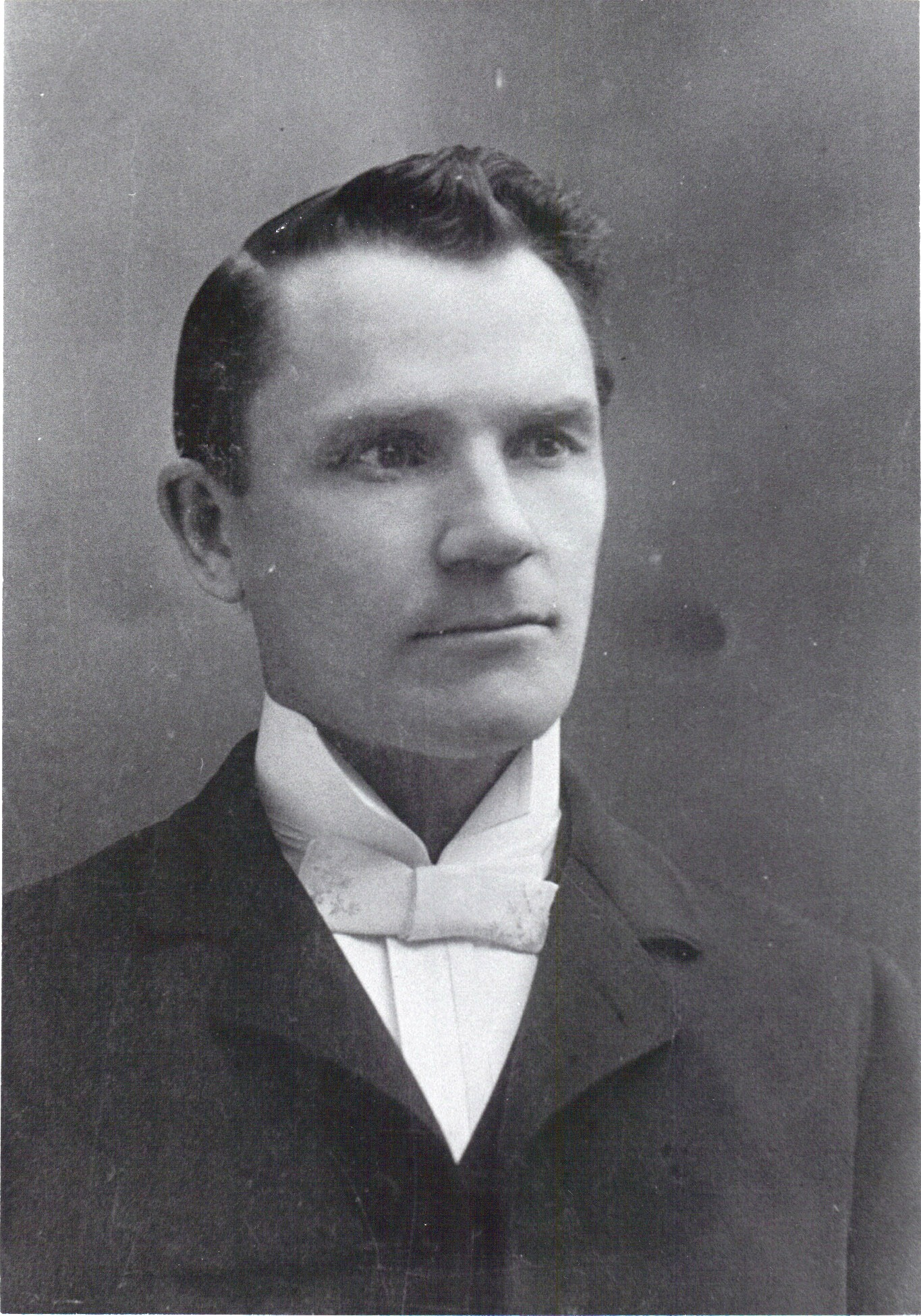
- Founder and first President of Eugene Divinity School, Eugene, Oregon
- Born: March 24, 1859; Greenville, Ohio, USA
- Died: February 16, 1940 (aged 80); Los Angeles, California, USA
- Education: Oskaloosa College; Drake University; University of Chicago
- Occupations: Minister and educator

Eugene C. Sanderson (March 24, 1859 – February 16, 1940) was an American Christian Church (Disciples of Christ) minister and educator who founded Eugene Divinity School (EDS) in Eugene, Oregon in 1895. Today this school is known as Bushnell University. He served as its first president from 1895 to 1930. He also founded four other Christian colleges and one hospital.

== Early life ==
Sanderson was born on March 24, 1859, in Fayette County, Ohio. Sanderson moved to Washington state in 1886 and pastored Christian Churches in Palouse, Colfax, Ellensburg, Sumner, Vancouver, and Olympia. In 1894 he was pastor at First Christian Church in Portland, Oregon.

== Eugene Divinity School ==
Dr. Sanderson saw a need to train ministers for the Christian Church in the Pacific Northwest. To do so, he returned to Chicago and completed his doctorate. In early 1895, he took part in a meeting in Eugene, Oregon to discuss establishing a school to train ministers. He strongly believed that locating ministerial schools near state institutions of higher education provided the best of both worlds. Thus, he deliberately located EDS next to the University of Oregon (UO) near East 11th Avenue and Alder Street to take advantage of the UO liberal arts program while EDS focused primarily on the ministerial courses including Bible, theology, music, and oratory. Eugene Divinity School became Eugene Bible University (EBU) in 1908. In 1908 the Administration Building was constructed. It is three stories tall and was constructed of volcanic stone from southern Oregon. Other buildings were constructed during his tenure, including the Music Building.

== Other institutions ==
During the 1920s Eugene Bible University, under Sanderson's leadership, expanded to include a number of other enterprises by incorporating the International Bible Mission (IBM). These two institutions were closely linked, especially financially. During the Great Depression, both EBU and IBM found themselves overextended and financially in default. Operations were scaled back to just the Eugene campus of EBU.

He founded Pacific Christian Hospital, which is now PeaceHealth Sacred Heart Medical Center University District, across Alder Street from EBU. There was a need for a good medical facility in Eugene at this time. Local citizens looked to Sanderson, because of his reputation, to develop such a facility. Construction began in February 1923. It opened on March 17, 1924. The six-story building cost about $225,000. It included a School for Nurses where a three-year program led to a degree as a Registered Nurse. In 1936 it was sold to the Sisters of St. Joseph of Newark for $50,000 and renamed Sacred Heart General Hospital.

He served as the second president of Minneapolis Bible College (now Crossroads College) in Rochester, Minnesota from 1924 to 1932. It had been founded by David E. Olsen, a 1908 graduate of EDS, in 1913.

He founded several schools across the United States that still exist including Christian Workers University (now Manhattan Christian College) in 1927 in Manhattan, Kansas; and Evangel Bible University (now William Jessup University in Rocklin, California) in 1934 in San Jose, California. This latter institution did not do well and his health was failing, so Sanderson asked one of his former students, William Jessup, a 1930 graduate of EBU, to take over. It was renamed San Jose Bible College in 1939.

He founded several schools that no longer exist. The first was Seattle Bible College in 1919, later renamed Eugene Bible University Extension Hall. The next was Colorado Bible College in 1927 in Fort Collins, Colorado. And finally Missouri Christian College in 1928 in Camden Point, Missouri.

He started a Home and School for Boys in Eugene in 1926 and another in 1927 in El Monte, California. In addition, he also started a Girl's Junior College which operated from 1911 to 1929 in Eugene. Finally, he started a Home for the Aged in Eugene in 1927. All of these are no longer in existence.

A number of his former students, many graduates of EDS and EBU, were involved with him in establishing these enterprises. In addition, many faculty from EBU helped with these various institutions.

== Academic background ==
Sanderson earned Bachelor of Arts and Master of Arts degrees from Oskaloosa College in 1883. He then spent a year at Yale Divinity School. Later he earned Bachelor of Divinity and Doctorate of Laws degrees from Drake University in 1893, followed by a Bachelor of Sacred Theology degree from the University of Chicago in 1894.

== Publications ==
In 1912 Sanderson published a book titled Our English Bible. In order to publicize the evangelical and educational work of EBU and IBM he published the Church and School paper, starting in 1909. It became the Christian Journal in 1915 and the World Evangel in 1925. It ceased publication in 1934.

== Death ==
Sanderson died on February 16, 1940, in Los Angeles, California. Both he and his wife Prudence are buried in Eugene Masonic Cemetery.
