= Bushnell University =

Private university in Eugene, Oregon, US

- Former names: Eugene Divinity School (1895–1908); Eugene Bible University (1908–1930); Eugene Bible College (1930–1934); Northwest Christian College (1934–2008); Northwest Christian University (2008–2020)
- Type: Private university
- Established: 1895; 131 years ago
- Affiliations: Council for Christian Colleges and Universities
- President: Joseph Womack
- Undergraduates: 576
- Postgraduates: 193
- Location: Eugene, Oregon, U.S. 44.047°N 123.0797°W
- Colors: Navy Blue & Gold
- Nickname: Beacons
- Sporting affiliations: NAIA – CCC
- Mascot: Beacon
- Website: bushnell.edu

Bushnell University is a private Christian university in Eugene, Oregon, United States. It is historically affiliated with the Christian churches and churches of Christ.

== History ==
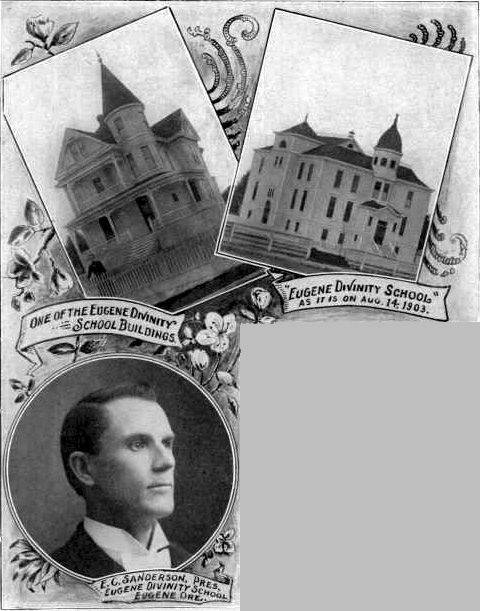
Photo of Bushnell University (then Eugene Divinity School) and its founder, 1903

The school was founded as a divinity school in 1895 by Christian Church preacher and educator Eugene Claremont Sanderson as the "Eugene Divinity School" (EDS). Sanderson envisioned a school at which students would study the Bible and principles of Christian ministry under Eugene Divinity School's faculty, but take other subjects on the neighboring campus, a model he also attempted to set up at Manhattan Christian College, located near Kansas State University. The Eugene Divinity School and its successive institutions maintained this arrangement with the University of Oregon until 1995, when it was discontinued.

In 1908 it became "Eugene Bible University"; in 1930 that name changed to "Eugene Bible College". After a merger with Spokane University in 1934, it became known as "Northwest Christian College" and then "Northwest Christian University" in 2008. In 2020, it formally changed its name to Bushnell University, after James A. Bushnell, the first chairman of the university's board of trustees. On December 8, 2009, Joseph Womack was named as Bushnell University's 10th president, taking office on June 1, 2010. Womack is the son of Bushnell's eighth president, James Womack, who served from 1986 to 2004.

=== Presidents ===
- Eugene C. Sanderson, 1895–1929
- S. Earl Childers, 1929–1934
- Victor P. Morris, Acting, 1934–1936 & 1943–1944
- Kendall E. Burke, 1936–1943
- Ross J. Griffeth, 1944–1965
- Barton A. Dowdy, 1965–1978
- William E. Hays, 1978–1985
- H. Charles Pyron, Interim, 1985–1986
- James E. Womack, 1986–2004
- David W. Wilson, 2004–2010
- Joseph D. Womack, 2010–present

== Academics ==
Bushnell University is organized into three schools: Theology, Arts & Sciences; Health Professions; and Professional Studies.

=== Accreditation and affiliations ===
Bushnell University is accredited by the Northwest Commission on Colleges and Universities. It is a member of the Oregon Alliance of Independent Colleges and Universities (OAICU), the Council for Christian Colleges and Universities (CCCU), and the Council on Undergraduate Research (CUR). The education programs are approved by the Oregon Teacher Standards and Practices Commission (TSPC), the business programs are accredited by the International Assembly of Collegiate Business Education (IACBE), and the Clinical Mental Health Counseling programs is accredited by the Council for Accreditation of Counseling and Related Educational Programs.

== Campus ==
Bushnell University is located in east Eugene, at the corner of Alder Street and E. 11th Avenue, separated from the larger University of Oregon by the width of a single lane street. Today, Bushnell students occasionally take University of Oregon classes, have checkout privileges from Knight Library, and take advantage of free lectures and other events on the neighboring campus.

=== Gallery ===
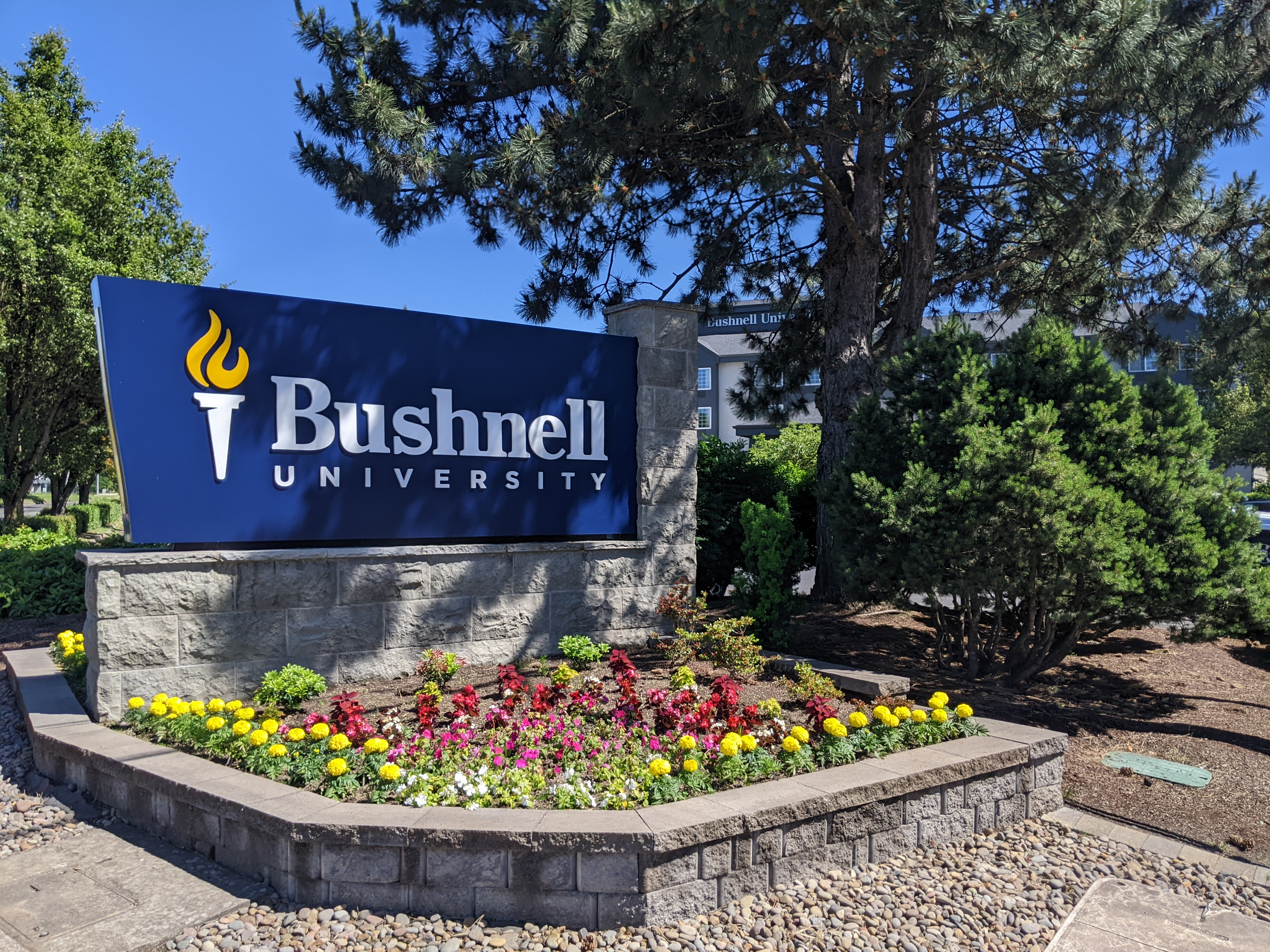
Entrance sign

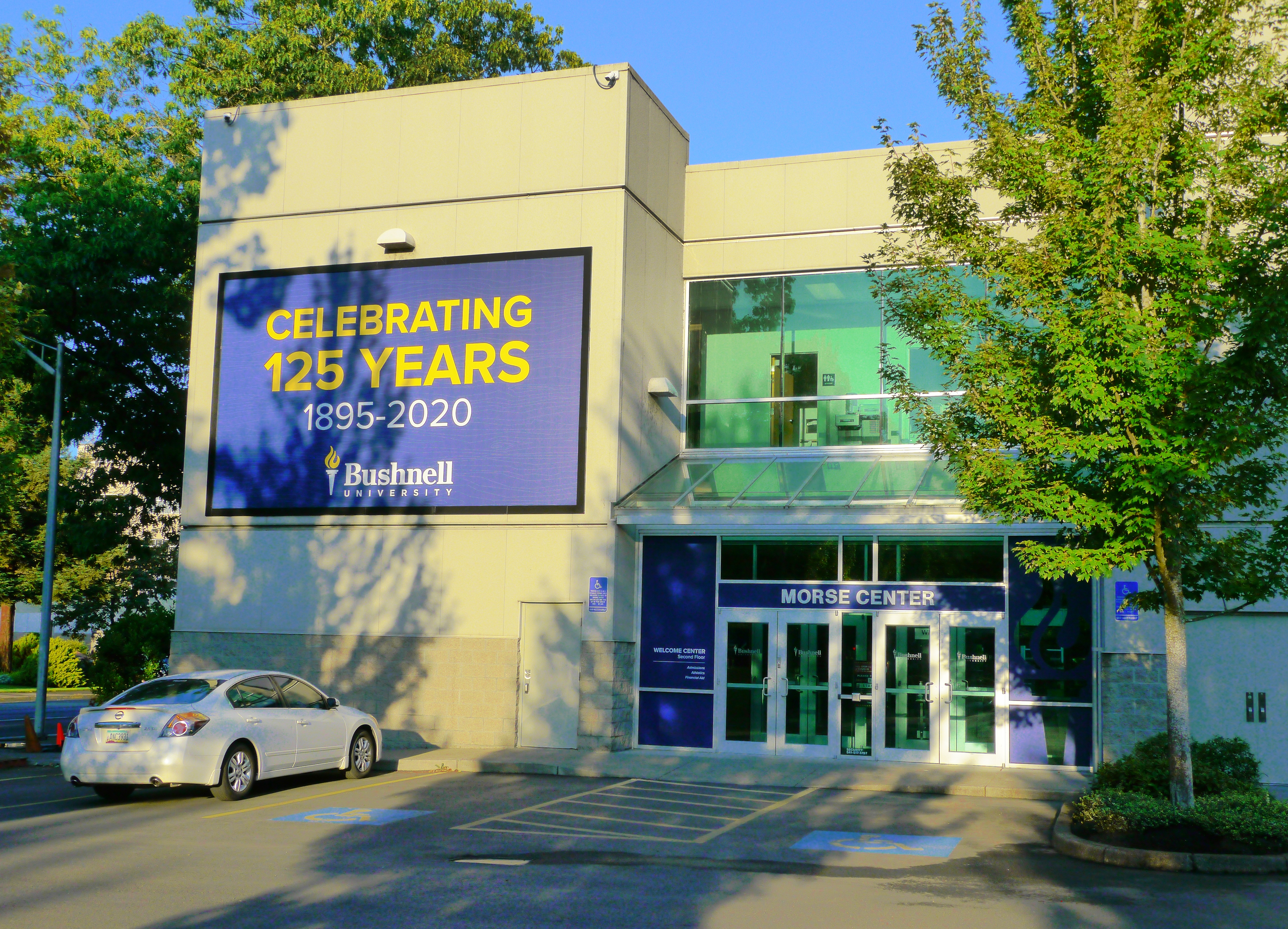
Morse Center

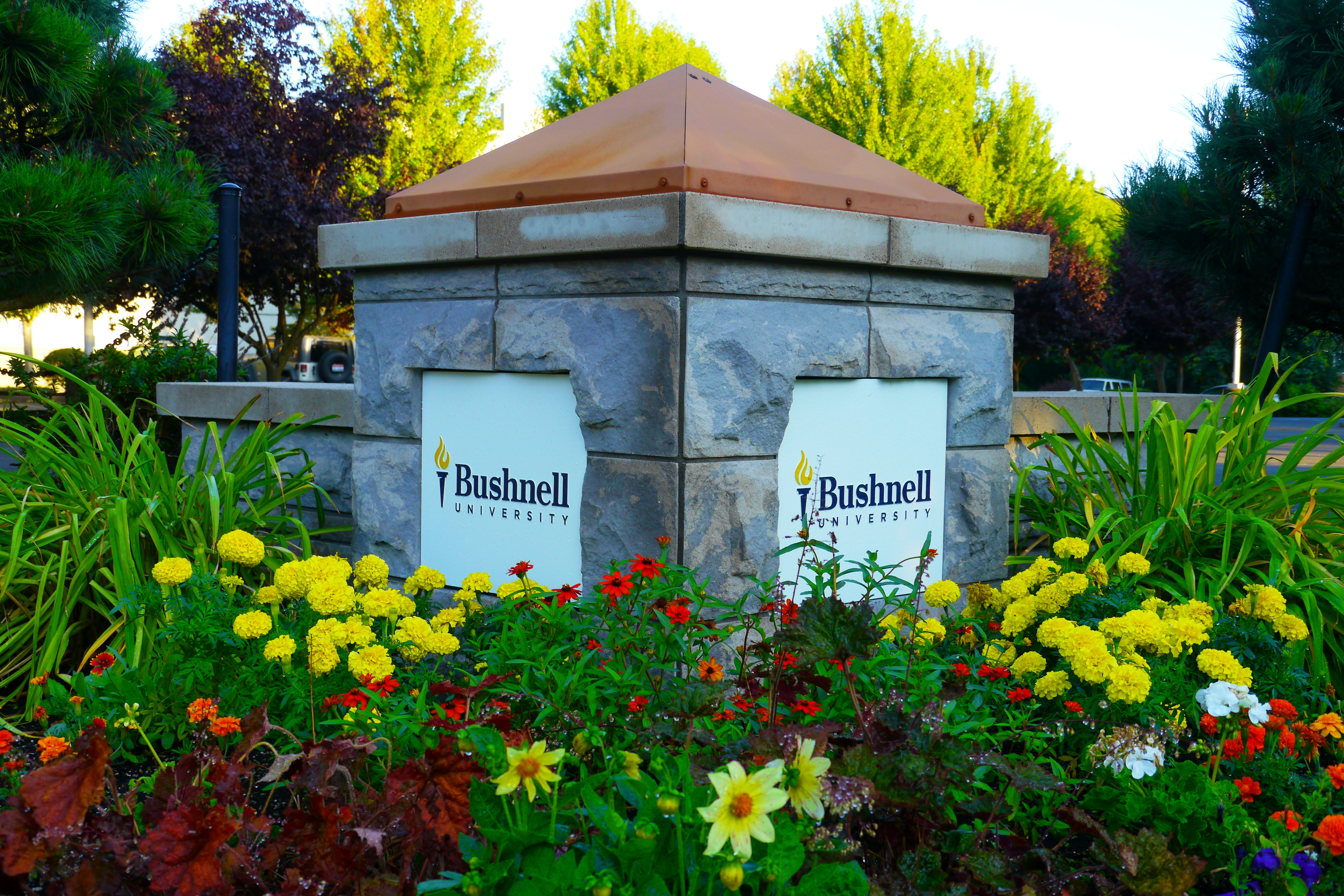
Bushnell sign

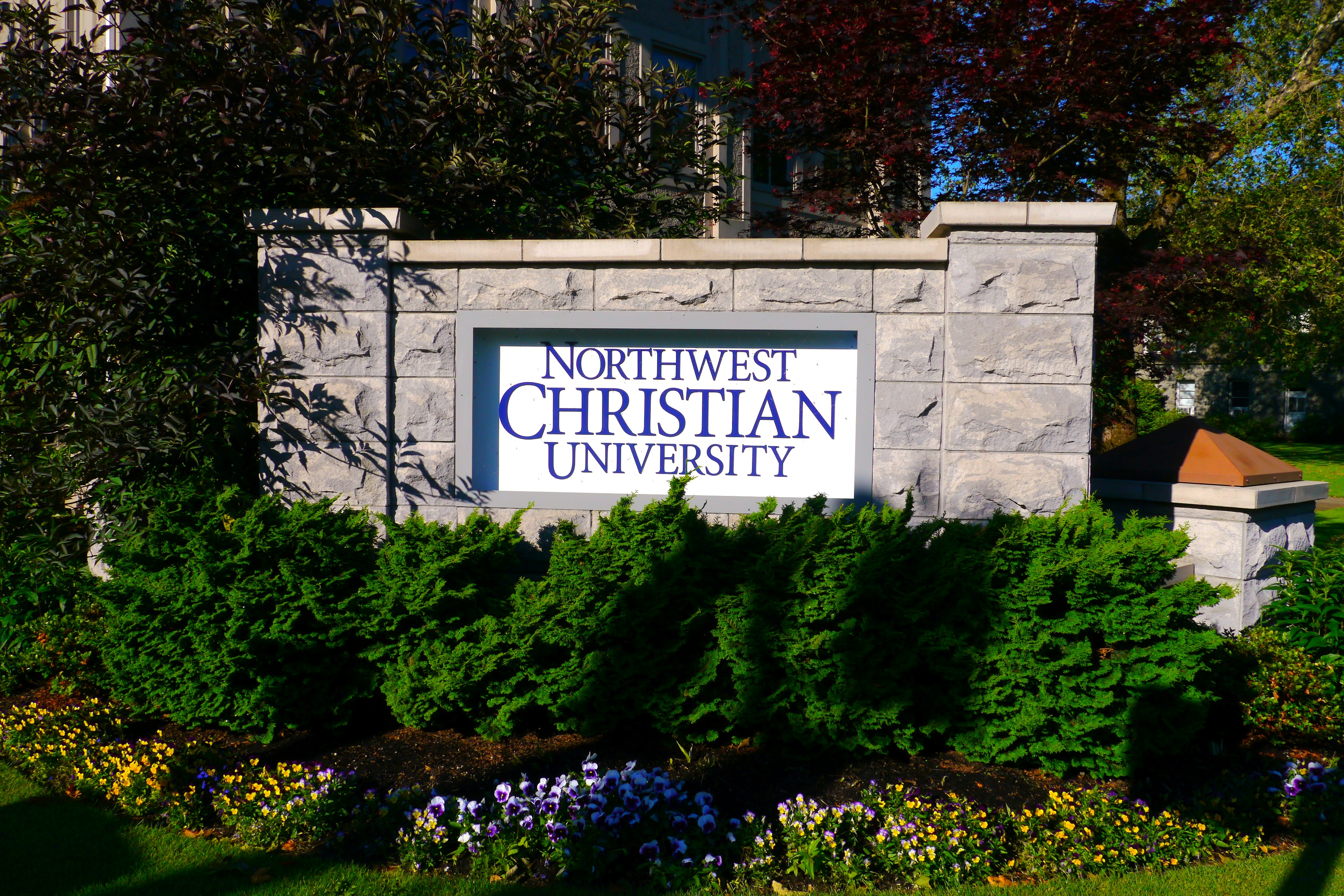
Sign while it was known as Northwest Christian University

== Athletics ==
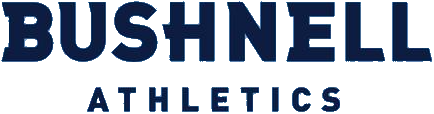
Bushnell athletics wordmark

The Bushnell athletic teams are called the Beacons. The university is a member of the National Association of Intercollegiate Athletics (NAIA), primarily competing in the Cascade Collegiate Conference (CCC) since the 2007–08 academic year; which they were a member on a previous stint during the 2006–07 school year as an associate member for women's volleyball and softball. The Beacons previously competed as an NAIA Independent from 2005–06 to 2006–07.

Bushnell competes in 16 intercollegiate varsity sports: Men's sports include baseball, basketball, cross country, eSports, golf, soccer and track & field; while women's sports include basketball, beach volleyball, cross country, eSports, golf, soccer, softball, track & field and volleyball.

=== Baseball ===
In January 2021, the university announced a plan to revive its baseball program after a more than 50-year hiatus as the school's 17th varsity sport offering, and named Tommy Richards, a former Baltimore Orioles' prospect and Whitman College Assistant, as the program's new head coach.

=== Cross country ===
During the fall of 2015 the woman's cross country team won first place in the NAIA Cross Country National Championship in Charlotte, North Carolina. This was the first time Bushnell University's (then known as Northwest Christian) cross country team won first place in this championship. The seven runners who competed at the meet were, Melissa Rios (Freshman), Rosa Schmidt (Sophomore), Shea Vallaire, (Junior), Michelle Fletcher, (Junior), Macie Gale, (Junior), and Alyssa Harmon (Junior).

=== Other sports ===
In 2018, Bailey Dell won the NAIA national championship in women's javelin. In 2019, Anika Rasubala won the NAIA national championship in women's steeplechase.

== Notable alumni ==
- Mary Burrows, politician
- Bruce Hanna, politician
- Mickey Loomis, professional football manager
- E. R. Moon, Christian missionary
- Frank Morse, politician
- Mike Petersen, professional basketball coach
- Ryan Stevenson, singer
- Paul Wright, singer
