= Monument High School =

Monument High School may refer to:

- Monument School in Monument, Oregon, United States
- Hoërskool Monument in Krugersdorp, South Africa
