= Oregon School Activities Association =

High school athletic association in Oregon, United States

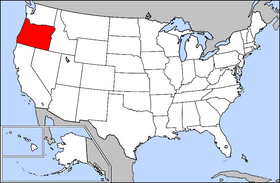
- Abbreviation: OSAA
- Formation: 1918
- Type: Volunteer; NPO
- Legal status: Association
- Purpose: Athletic/Educational
- Headquarters: 25200 SW Parkway Ave. Suite 1 Wilsonville, OR 97070
- Coordinates: 45.3378°N 122.7659°W
- Region served: Oregon
- Executive Director: Peter Weber
- Affiliations: National Federation of State High School Associations
- Staff: 13
- Website: www.osaa.org

The Oregon School Activities Association (OSAA) is a non-profit, board-governed organization that regulates high school athletics and competitive activities via athletic conferences in the U.S. state of Oregon, providing equitable competition among its members, both public and private. The OSAA is based in Wilsonville.

== History ==
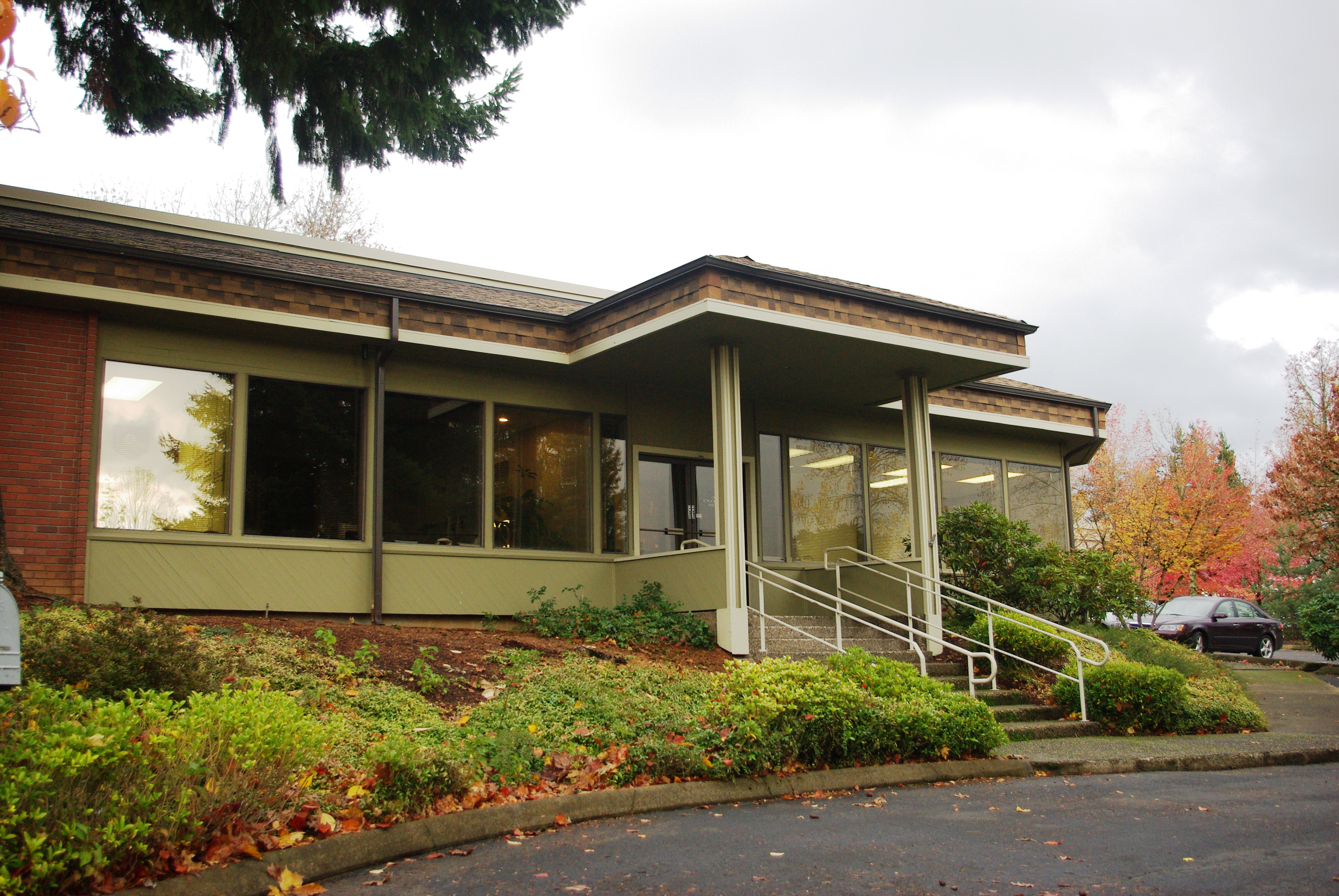
OSAA offices in Wilsonville

Originally created in 1918 as the "Oregon State High School Athletic Association", the name changed to the "Oregon School Activities Association", or OSAA, in 1947.

Currently, the OSAA sponsors seventy-four state championships in nineteen interscholastic activities including athletics, music, and forensics and is a member of the National Federation of State High School Associations.

Starting in the 2006–07 school year, the organization's four school classifications (1A, 2A, 3A, 4A) were divided into six classifications (6A, 5A, 4A, 3A, 2A, 1A). This caused some controversy as some school districts complained about the new classifications and sought legal action. OSAA voted to keep a six classification system in 2017.

== Classifications and leagues ==
The OSAA divides schools up into classifications and leagues (or conferences).

There are six classifications, with the smallest schools in class 1A and the largest schools in class 6A. Within each classification, there are between five and eight leagues and conferences. Each league or conference has between four and 16 schools. Prior to 2006, there were four classifications (4A, 3A, 2A, 1A), prior to 1990, there were four classifications (AAA, AA, A, B), and prior to 1970, there were either three or four classifications (depending on the sport), but they were designated as A, A-2, B, B-8 for football, A-1, A-2 and B in basketball and A, A-2, & B for baseball.

According to OSAA's classification system for 2026–30, a 1A school has fewer than 65 students, 2A between 66 and 140 students, 3A between 141 and 280 students, 4A between 281 and 580 students, 5A between 581 and 1025 students, and the largest schools, 6A, have 1026 or more students.

As of the 2026–30 season, OSAA's classifications comprise the following:

=== 6A/5A classification Hybrid ===
==== 6A/5A: Southwest Hybrid ====
- Ashland Grizzlies
- Crater Comets
- Eagle Point Eagles
- Grants Pass Cavemen
- North Medford Black Tornado
- Roseburg Indians
- South Medford Panthers

==== 6A/5A: Midwestern Hybrid ====
- Churchill Lancers
- North Eugene Highlanders
- Sheldon Irish
- South Eugene Axe
- Springfield Millers
- Thurston Colts
- Willamette Wolverines

=== 6A classification ===
==== 6A-1: Portland Interscholastic League ====
- Benson Astros
- Cleveland Warriors
- Franklin Lightning
- Grant Generals
- Jefferson Democrats
- Lincoln Cardinals
- McDaniel Mountain Lions
- Roosevelt Roughriders
- Wells Guardians

==== 6A-2: Metro League ====
- Beaverton Beavers
- Jesuit Crusaders (private)
- Mountainside Mavericks
- Southridge Skyhawks
- Sunset Apollos
- Westview Wildcats

==== 6A-3: Pacific Conference ====
- Century Jaguars
- Forest Grove Vikings
- Glencoe Crimson Tide
- McMinnville Grizzlies
- Newberg Tigers
- Sherwood Bowmen

==== 6A-4: Mt. Hood Conference ====
- Barlow Bruins
- Central Catholic Rams (private)
- Clackamas Cavaliers
- David Douglas Scots
- Gresham Gophers
- Nelson Hawks
- Reynolds Raiders

==== 6A-5: Three Rivers League ====
- Lake Oswego Lakers
- Lakeridge Pacers
- Oregon City Pioneers
- St. Mary's Academy Blues (private, girls only)
- Tigard Tigers
- Tualatin Timberwolves
- West Linn Lions

==== 6A-6: Central Valley Conference ====
- McKay Scots
- McNary Celtics
- North Salem Vikings
- South Salem Saxons
- Sprague Olympians
- West Salem Titans

=== 5A classification ===
==== 5A-1: East Metro Conference ====
- Centennial Eagles
- Hood River Valley Eagles
- Milwaukie Mustangs
- Parkrose Broncos
- Rex Putnam Kingsmen
- Sandy Pioneers
- St. Helens Lions

==== 5A-2: Northwest Oregon Conference ====
- Aloha Warriors
- Canby Cougars
- Hillsboro Spartans
- La Salle Falcons (private)
- Liberty Falcons
- Wilsonville Wildcats
- Woodburn Bulldogs

==== 5A-3: Mid-Willamette Conference ====
- Corvallis Spartans
- Crescent Valley Raiders
- Dallas Dragons
- Lebanon Warriors
- Silverton Foxes
- South Albany Red Hawks
- West Albany Bulldogs

==== 5A-4: Intermountain Conference ====
- Bend Lava Bears
- Caldera Wolfpack
- Crook County Cowboys
- Mountain View Cougars
- Redmond Panthers
- Ridgeview Ravens
- Summit Storm

=== 4A classification ===
==== 4A-1: Cowapa League ====
- Astoria Fishermen
- Banks Braves
- Scappoose Indians
- Seaside Seagulls
- Tillamook Cheesemakers
- Valley Catholic Valiants (private)

==== 4A-2: Tri-Valley Conference ====
- Estacada Rangers
- Gladstone Gladiators
- Madras White Buffaloes
- Molalla Indians
- North Marion Huskies
- The Dalles Riverhawks

==== 4A-3: Oregon West Conference ====
- Cascade Cougars
- Central Panthers
- Newport Cubs
- Philomath Warriors
- Stayton Eagles
- Taft Tigers

==== 4A-4: Sky-Em League ====
- Cottage Grove Lions
- Elmira Falcons
- Junction City Tigers
- Marist Catholic Spartans (private)
- Marshfield Pirates
- North Bend Bulldogs
- South Umpqua Lancers

==== 4A-5: Skyline Conference ====
- Cascade Christian Challengers (private)
- Henley Hornets
- Hidden Valley Mustangs
- Klamath Union Pelicans
- Mazama Vikings
- North Valley Knights
- Phoenix Pirates

==== 4A-6: Greater Oregon League ====
- Baker Bulldogs
- La Grande Tigers
- Ontario Tigers
- Pendleton Buckaroos

=== 3A classification ===
==== 3A-1: Coastal Range League ====
- Catlin Gabel Eagles (private)
- Corbett Cardinals
- Neah-Kah-Nie Pirates
- Oregon Episcopal Aardvarks (private)
- Rainier Columbians
- Warrenton Warriors

==== 3A-2: Lewis & Clark League ====
- De La Salle North Catholic Knights (private)
- Horizon Christian Hawks (private)
- Portland Adventist Academy Cougars (private)
- Riverdale Mavericks
- Westside Christian Eagles (private)

==== 3A-3: PacWest Conference ====
- Blanchet Catholic Cavaliers (private)
- Gervais Cougars
- Harrisburg Eagles
- Jefferson Lions
- Scio Loggers
- Salem Academy Crusaders (private)

==== 3A-4: West Valley League ====
- Amity Warriors
- Dayton Pirates
- Santiam Christian Eagles (private)
- Willamina Bulldogs
- Yamhill-Carlton Tigers

==== 3A-5: Mountain Valley Conference ====
- Creswell Bulldogs
- La Pine Hawks
- Pleasant Hill Billies
- Sisters Outlaws
- Sweet Home Huskies
- Trinity Lutheran Saints (private)

==== 3A-6: Far West League ====
- Brookings-Harbor Bruins
- Coquille Red Devils
- Douglas Trojans
- Glide Wildcats
- Illinois Valley Cougars
- Siuslaw Vikings
- Sutherlin Bulldogs
- St. Mary's Crusaders (private)

==== 3A-7: Eastern Oregon League ====
- Burns Hilanders
- McLoughlin Pioneers
- Nyssa Bulldogs
- Riverside Pirates
- Umatilla Vikings
- Vale Vikings

=== 2A classification ===
==== 2A-1: Northwest League ====
- Clatskanie Tigers
- Faith Bible Falcons (private)
- Gaston Greyhounds
- Knappa Loggers
- Nestucca Bobcats
- Vernonia Loggers

==== 2A-2: Metro East Conference ====
- Country Christian Cougars (private)
- Mannahouse Christian Academy Lions (private)
- North Clackamas Christian Saints (private)
- Portland Christian Royals (private)
- Riverside High School (public)
- Southwest Christian Wildcats (private)

==== 2A-3: Tri-River Conference ====
- Colton Vikings
- Delphian School Dragons (private)
- Kennedy Trojans
- Regis Rams (private)
- Santiam Wolverines
- Sheridan Spartans
- St. Paul Buckaroos
- Western Christian Pioneers (private)

==== 2A-4: Valley Coast Conference ====
- Central Linn Cobras
- Crosshill Christian Eagles (private)
- East Linn Christian Academy Eagles (private)
- Lowell Devils
- Monroe Dragons
- Oakridge Warriors
- Toledo Boomers
- Waldport Irish

==== 2A-5: Wapiti League ====
- Cove Leopards
- Crane Mustangs
- Elgin Huskies
- Enterprise Outlaws
- Harper Hornets
- Imbler Panthers
- Union Bobcats

==== 2A-6: Blue Mountain Conference ====
- Grant Union Prospectors
- Heppner Mustangs
- Irrigon Knights
- Stanfield Tigers
- Weston-McEwen Tiger Scots

==== 2A-7: Sunset Conference ====
- Bandon Tigers
- Gold Beach Panthers
- Myrtle Point Bobcats
- North Douglas Warriors
- Oakland Oakers
- Reedsport Braves

==== 2A-8: East Cascades Conference ====
- Bonanza Antlers
- Culver Bulldogs
- Lakeview Honkers
- Lost River Raiders
- Rogue River Chieftains

=== 1A classification ===
==== 1A-1: The Valley 10 League ====
- Columbia Christian Knights (private)
- Damascus Christian Eagles (private)
- Grand View Christian Huskies (private)
- Life Christian Lions (private)
- Open Door Christian Huskies (private)
- Portland Waldorf Wolfpack (private)
- St. Stephen's Archers (private)
- Trinity Academy Thunder (private)
- Tualatin Valley Academy Eagles (private)
- Valor Christian Knights (private)
- Paideia Classical Christian School (private)

==== 1A-2: Casco League ====
- C. S. Lewis Watchmen (private)
- Chemawa Braves
- Falls City Mountaineers
- Jewell Bluejays
- Livingstone Lions (private)
- Oregon School for the Deaf Panthers
- Perrydale Pirates
- Veritas Vanguard (private)
- Willamette Valley Christian Warriors (private)

==== 1A-3: Mountain West League ====
- Alsea Wolverines
- Crow Cougars
- Eddyville Charter Eagles
- Eugene Christian Lions (private)
- Kings Valley Eagles
- Mapleton Sailors
- McKenzie Eagles
- Mohawk Mustangs
- Northwest Christian Academy Warriors (private)
- Siletz Valley Warriors
- Triangle Lake Lakers

==== 1A-4: Skyline League ====
- Camas Valley Hornets
- Days Creek Wolves
- Elkton Elks
- Glendale Pirates
- Milo Adventist Mustangs
- New Hope Christian Warriors (private)
- Pacific Pirates
- Powers Cruisers
- Riddle Irish
- Rogue Christian Academy Eagles (private)
- Umpqua Valley Christian Monarchs (private)
- Yoncalla Eagles

==== 1A-5: Mountain Valley League ====
- Butte Falls Loggers
- Cascades Academy Steelhead (private)
- Central Christian Tigers (private)
- Chiloquin Panthers
- Crosspoint Christian Warriors (private)
- Gilchrist Grizzlies
- Harvest Christian Nighthawks (private)
- North Lake Cowboys
- Paisley Broncos
- Prospect Cougars
- Rogue Valley Adventist Red Tail Hawks (private)

==== 1A-6: Big Sky League ====
- Arlington Honkers
- Bickleton Pirates
- Condon Blue Devils
- Dufur Rangers
- Glenwood Eagles
- Horizon Christian Hawks (private)
- Ione Cardinals
- Klickitat Vandals
- Lyle Cougars
- Mitchell Loggers
- Sherman Huskies
- South Wasco County Redsides
- Spray Eagles
- Trout Lake Mustangs
- Wheeler Falcons
- Wishram Indians

==== 1A-7: Old Oregon League ====
- Echo Cougars
- Griswold Grizzles
- Joseph Eagles
- Nixyaawii Golden Eagles
- Pilot Rock Rockets
- Pine Eagle Spartans
- Powder Valley Badgers
- Wallowa Cougars

==== 1A-8: High Desert League ====
- Adrian Antelopes
- Burnt River Bulls
- Dayville Tigers
- Four Rivers Falcons
- Huntington Locomotives
- Jordan Valley Mustangs
- Long Creek Mountaineers
- Monument Tigers
- Prairie City Panthers
- Ukiah Cougars

=== Former members ===
- Hermiston High School - moved to the Washington Interscholastic Activities Association to compete in the Columbia Basin Conference, which consists of schools in Tri-Cities, Washington

== Football Classifications ==
The Football AD Hoc Committee Will have there 2026 Released by January 22, 2026,

Schools often compete in different divisions for football; in other sports, conferences are constructed to aim to preserve historic rivalries, regardless of current enrollment. As of the 2022–23 season, OSAA's classifications comprise the following:

=== 6A classification ===
==== 6A-1: Portland Interscholastic League ====
- Benson Tech Astros
- Cleveland Warriors
- Franklin Lightning
- Grant Generals
- Jefferson Democrats
- Lincoln Cardinals
- McDaniel Mountain Lions
- Roosevelt Roughriders
- Wells Guardians

==== 6A-2: Metro League ====
- Beaverton Beavers
- Jesuit Crusaders (private)
- Mountainside Mavericks
- Southridge Skyhawks
- Sunset Apollos
- Westview Wildcats

==== 6A-3: Pacific Conference ====
- Century Jaguars
- Liberty Falcons
- McMinnville Grizzlies
- Newberg Tigers
- Sherwood Bowmen

==== 6A-4: Mt. Hood Conference ====
- Barlow Bruins
- Central Catholic Rams (private)
- Clackamas Cavaliers
- David Douglas Scots
- Gresham Gophers
- Nelson Hawks
- Reynolds Raiders
- Sandy Pioneers

==== 6A-5: Three Rivers League ====
- Lake Oswego Lakers
- Lakeridge Pacers
- Oregon City Pioneers
- Tigard Tigers
- Tualatin Timberwolves
- West Linn Lions

==== 6A-6: Central/Southwest Valley Conference ====
- Grants Pass Cavemen
- McNary Celtics
- North Medford Black Tornado
- North Salem Vikings
- Sheldon Irish
- South Medford Panthers
- South Salem Saxons
- Sprague Olympians
- West Salem Titans

=== 5A classification ===
==== 5A-SD1: Special District 1 ====
- Aloha Warriors
- Centennial Eagles
- Forest Grove Vikings (6A)
- Glencoe Crimson Tide
- Hillsboro Spartans
- Hood River Valley Eagles
- Rex Putnam Kingsmen
- La Salle Falcons (private)

==== 5A-SD2: Special District 2 ====
- Canby Cougars
- Central Panthers
- McKay Scots
- Silverton Foxes
- Wilsonville Wildcats
- Woodburn Bulldogs

==== 5A-SD3: Special District 3 ====
- Corvallis Spartans
- Crescent Valley Raiders
- Dallas Dragons
- Lebanon Warriors
- South Albany Red Hawks
- West Albany Bulldogs

==== 5A-SD4: Special District 4 ====
- Churchill Lancers
- Crater Comets
- Eagle Point Eagles
- North Eugene Highlanders
- Roseburg Indians (6A)
- South Eugene Axe (6A)
- Springfield Millers
- Thurston Colts
- Willamette Wolverines (6A)

==== 5A-SD5: Special District 5 ====
- Bend Lava Bears
- Caldera Wolfpack
- Mountain View Cougars
- Redmond Panthers
- Ridgeview Ravens
- Summit Storm

=== 4A classification ===
==== 4A-SD1: Special District 1 ====
- Astoria Fishermen
- Milwaukie Mustangs (5A)
- Scappoose Indians
- Seaside Seagulls
- St. Helens Lions
- Tillamook Cheesemakers

==== 4A-SD2: Special District 2 ====
- Estacada Rangers
- Gladstone Gladiators
- Molalla Indians
- Parkrose Broncos
- The Dalles Riverhawks

==== 4A-SD3: Special District 3 ====
- Cascade Cougars
- Junction City Tigers
- Marist Catholic Spartans (private)
- Philomath Warriors
- Stayton Eagles
- Sweet Home Huskies

==== 4A-SD4: Special District ====
- Ashland Grizzlies (5A)
- Henley Hornets
- Hidden Valley Mustangs
- Marshfield Pirates
- Mazama Vikings
- North Bend Bulldogs

==== 4A-SD5: Special District 5 ====
- Baker Bulldogs
- Crook County Cowboys
- La Grande Tigers
- Ontario Tigers
- Pendleton Buckaroos

=== 3A classification ===
==== 3A-SD1: Special District 1 ====
- Banks Braves
- Kennedy Trojans (2A)
- North Marion Huskies (4A)
- Rainier Columbians
- Valley Catholic Valiants (private)
- Warrenton Warriors
- Yamhill-Carlton Tigers

==== 3A-SD2: Special District 2 ====
- Amity Warriors
- Blanchet Catholic Cavaliers (private)
- Dayton Pirates
- Newport Cubs (4A)
- Santiam Christian Eagles (private)
- Scio Loggers
- Taft Tigers
- Willamina Bulldogs

==== 3A-SD3: Special District 3 ====
- Cottage Grove Lions
- Creswell Bulldogs
- Elmira Falcons
- Harrisburg Eagles
- La Pine Hawks
- Madras White Buffaloes
- Pleasant Hill Billies
- Sisters Outlaws

==== 3A-SD4: Special District 4 ====
- Brookings-Harbor Bruins
- Coquille Red Devils
- Douglas Trojans
- Siuslaw Vikings
- South Umpqua Lancers
- Sutherlin Bulldogs

==== 3A-SD5: Special District 5 ====
- Cascade Christian Challengers (Private)
- Klamath Union Pelicans
- Lakeview Honkers
- North Valley Knights
- Phoenix Pirates (4A)
- St. Mary's Crusaders (Private)

==== 3A-SD6: Special District 6 ====
- Burns Hillanders
- McLoughlin Pioneers
- Nyssa Bulldogs
- Ontario Tigers (4A)
- Vale Vikings

=== 2A classification ===
==== 2A-SD1: Special District 1 ====
- Clatskanie Tigers
- Corbett Cardinals
- Gaston Greyhounds
- Knappa Loggers
- Neah-Kah-Nie Pirates (3A)
- Nestucca Bobcats
- Vernonia Loggers / *Jewell Bluejays (Combined)

==== 2A-SD2: Special District 2 ====
- Chemawa Braves
- Colton Vikings
- Gervais Cougars
- Regis Rams (private)
- Sheridan Spartans (3A)
- Salem Academy Crusaders (private)
- Santiam Wolverines

==== 2A-SD3: Special District 3 ====
- Central Linn Cobras
- Jefferson Lions
- Monroe Dragons
- St. Paul Buckaroos
- Toledo Boomers
- Waldport Irish

==== 2A-SD4: Special District 4 ====
- Bandon Tigers
- Gold Beach Panthers
- Illinois Valley Cougars
- Myrtle Point Bobcats
- Oakland Oakers
- Reedsport Braves

==== 2A-SD5: Special District 5 ====
- Bonanza Antlers
- Culver Bulldogs
- Glide Wildcats (3A)
- Lost River Raiders
- Lowell Devils
- Oakridge Warriors
- Rogue River Chieftains (3A)

==== 2A-SD6: Special District 6 ====
- Enterprise Outlaws (2A)
- Grant Union Prospectors
- Heppner Mustangs
- Irrigon Knights
- Riverside Pirates (3A)
- Stanfield Tigers
- Weston-McEwen Tiger Scots

=== 1A classification, 8-man football ===
No League Yet

- Portland Christian Royals (private)
- North Douglas Warriors (1A)
- Yoncalla Eagles (1A)
- Umatilla Vikings (3A)

==== 1A[8]-SD1: Special District 1 ====
- Alsea Wolverines
- Butte Falls Loggers
- Camas Valley Hornets
- Chiloquin Panthers
- Crosspoint Christian Warriors (private)
- Falls City Mountaineers
- Kings Valley Eagles
- Mohawk Mustangs
- Perrydale Pirates
- Prospect Cougars

==== 1A[8]-SD2-E: Special District 2, East ====
- Adrian Antelopes
- Cove Leopards
- Elgin Huskies
- Imbler Panthers
- Pilot Rock Rockets
- Powder Valley Badgers
- Union Bobcats
- Wallowa Cougars

==== 1A[8]-SD2-W: Special District 2, West ====
- Arlington Honkers
- Condon Blue Devils
- Crane Mustangs
- Dufur Rangers
- Ione Cardinals
- Klickitat Vandals
- Lyle Cougars
- Sherman Huskies
- Wishram Indians

=== 1A classification, 6-man football ===
==== 1A[6]-SD1: Special District 1 ====
- Burnt River Bulls
- Dayville Tigers
- Echo Cougars
- Harper Hornets
- Huntington Locomotives
- Joseph Eagles
- Mitchell Loggers
- Monument Tigers
- Pine Eagle Spartans
- Prairie City Panthers
- South Wasco County Redsides
- Spray Eagles
- Wheeler Falcons

==== 1A[6]-SD2-N: Special District 2, North ====
- Crow Cougars
- Eddyville Charter Eagles
- Mapleton Sailors
- McKenzie Eagles
- Siletz Valley Warriors
- Triangle Lake Lakers

==== 1A[6]-SD2-S: Special District 2, South ====
- Days Creek Wolves
- Elkton Elks
- Gilchrist Grizzlies
- Glendale Pirates
- North Lake Cowboys
- Powers Cruisers
- Riddle Irish

== Historic conferences made defunct by 2006 reclassification ==
4A Southern Oregon Conference : The final year of the Southern Oregon Conference consisted of South Medford, North Medford, Klamath Union, Eagle Point, Ashland, Crater, Grants Pass and Roseburg. This league was for 4A schools located near the Oregon-California border.

3A Tri-Valley Conference: The final year of the Tri-Valley Conference consisted of La Salle High School (Milwaukie, Oregon), Madras High School, Valley Catholic High School (Beaverton, Oregon), Estacada High School, Molalla Highschool, Sherwood High School, and Wilsonville High School. This league was for 3A sized schools located in or near the Portland-Metro area. The Tri-Valley conference is currently active once again as of the 2009 season. It is a 4A Conference for schools located in the Portland-Metro Area.

2A Columbia Basin Conference: The final year of the Columbia Basin Conference consisted of Culver High School, Heppner Junior/Senior High School, Pilot Rock High School, Sherman High School, Stanfield High School, Umatilla High School, and Weston-McEwen High School. This league was for 2A sized schools located in central-eastern Oregon.

2A Trico League: The final year of the Trico League consisted of East Linn Christian Academy (Lebanon, Oregon), Harrisburg High School, Jefferson High School, Waldport High School, Monroe High School, Central Linn High School, and Oakridge High School. This league was for 2A sized schools located in the central Willamette Valley.

2A Wapiti League: The final year of the Wapiti League consisted of Grant Union High School, Vale High School, Nyssa High School, Elgin High School, Enterprise High School, and Union High School. This League was for 2A sized schools located in far-eastern Oregon.

== OSAA-sanctioned activities ==
The OSAA oversees the following activities:

Two-gender sports	Boys only sports	Girls only sports	Other activities
Basketball; Cross Country; Golf; Soccer; Swimming; Tennis; Track & Field; Wrestling; Volleyball	Baseball; Football	Softball	Band/Orchestra; Cheerleading; Choir; Dance/Drill; Solo Music; Speech and Debate

== See also ==
- List of high schools in Oregon
