= Condon High School =

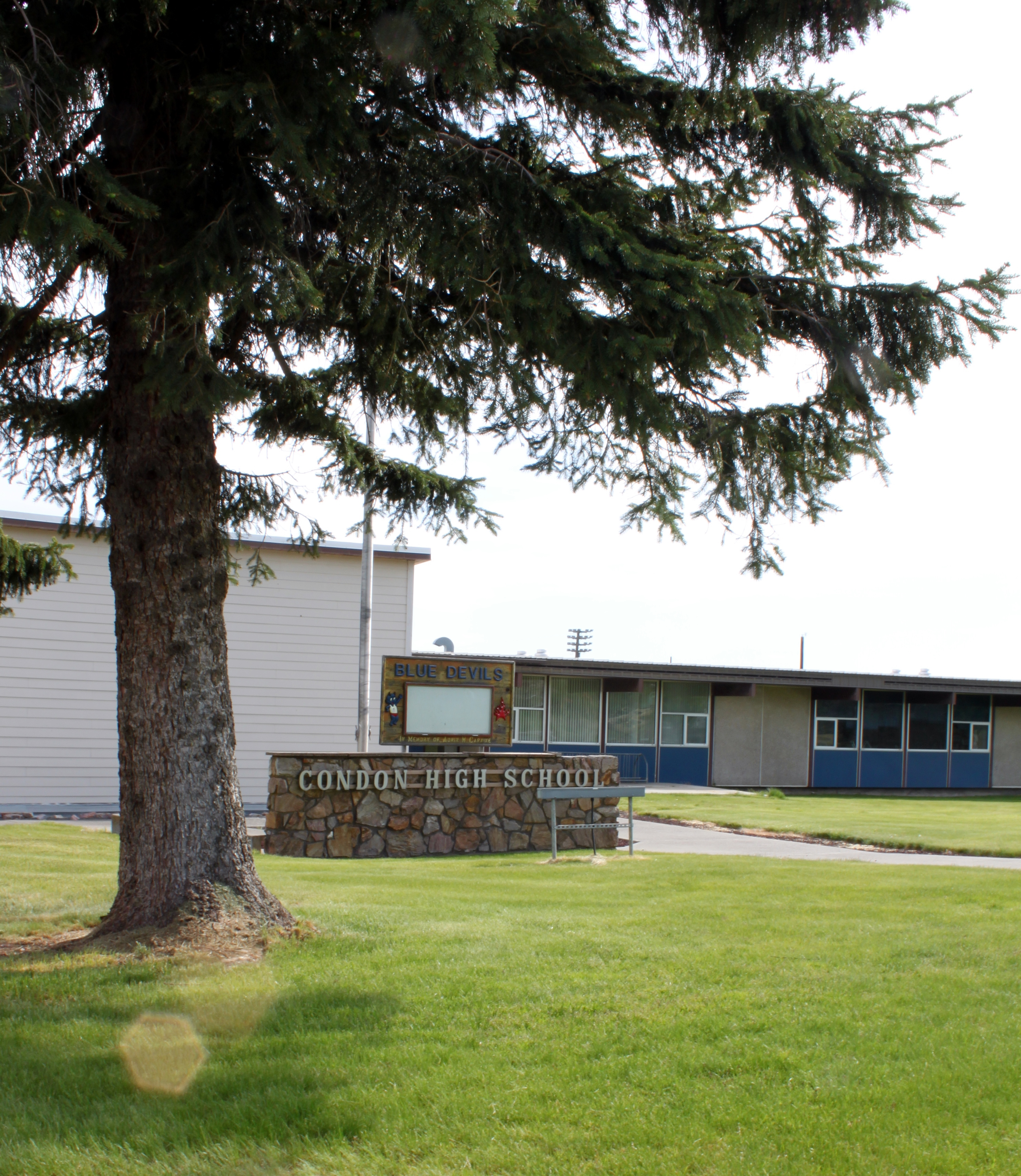

Location
- 210 E Bayard Street; Condon, Gilliam County, Oregon 97823; United States; 45.231828°N 120.182608°W

Information
- Type: Public
- School district: Condon School District
- Principal: Michelle Geer
- Grades: 9-12
- Enrollment: 46 (2024-2025)
- Colors: Royal blue, cardinal and white
- Athletics conference: OSAA Big Sky League 1A-6
- Mascot: Blue Devils
- Rival: Arlington High School
- Website: www.condon.k12.or.us/page/high-school

Condon High School is a high school located in Condon, Oregon, United States.

== Academics ==
In 2008, 93% of the school's seniors received their high school diploma. Of 14 students, 13 graduated and 1 dropped out.

== Athletics ==
=== State championships ===
- Girls basketball, 1997, 1998, 1999, 2000, 2002, 2014
- Boys basketball, 1987, 1990
