= Elkton High School =

Elkton High School may refer to:

- Elkton High School (Maryland), Elkton, Maryland
- Elkton High School (Oregon), Elkton, Oregon
- Elkton High School (South Dakota), Elkton, South Dakota
