= Umatilla High School =

Umatilla High School may refer to:

== United States ==
- Umatilla High School (Florida), Umatilla, Florida
- Umatilla High School (Oregon), Umatilla, Oregon
