= Prairie City High School =

Prairie City High School may refer to:

- Bushnell-Prairie City High School, Bushnell, Illinois
- Prairie City High School (Iowa), Prairie City, Iowa
- Prairie City School, Prairie City, Oregon
