= Long Creek School (Long Creek, Oregon) =

Location
- 375 E Main Street; Long Creek, (Grant County), Oregon 97856; United States; 44.713564°N 119.09935°W

Information
- Type: Public
- School district: Long Creek School District
- Principal: Brian Gander
- Staff: 4.50 (FTE)
- Grades: Pre K-12
- Enrollment: 28 (2024–2025)
- Student to teacher ratio: 6.22
- Colors: Red, white, and black
- Athletics conference: OSAA High Desert League 1A-8
- Mascot: Mountaineer
- Website: www.grantesd.k12.or.us/long-creek

Long Creek School is a public school in Long Creek, Oregon, United States. It is the only school in the Long Creek School District.

== Academics ==
In 2008, 100% of the school's seniors received a high school diploma. Of two students, two graduated and none dropped out.
