= Days Creek Charter School =

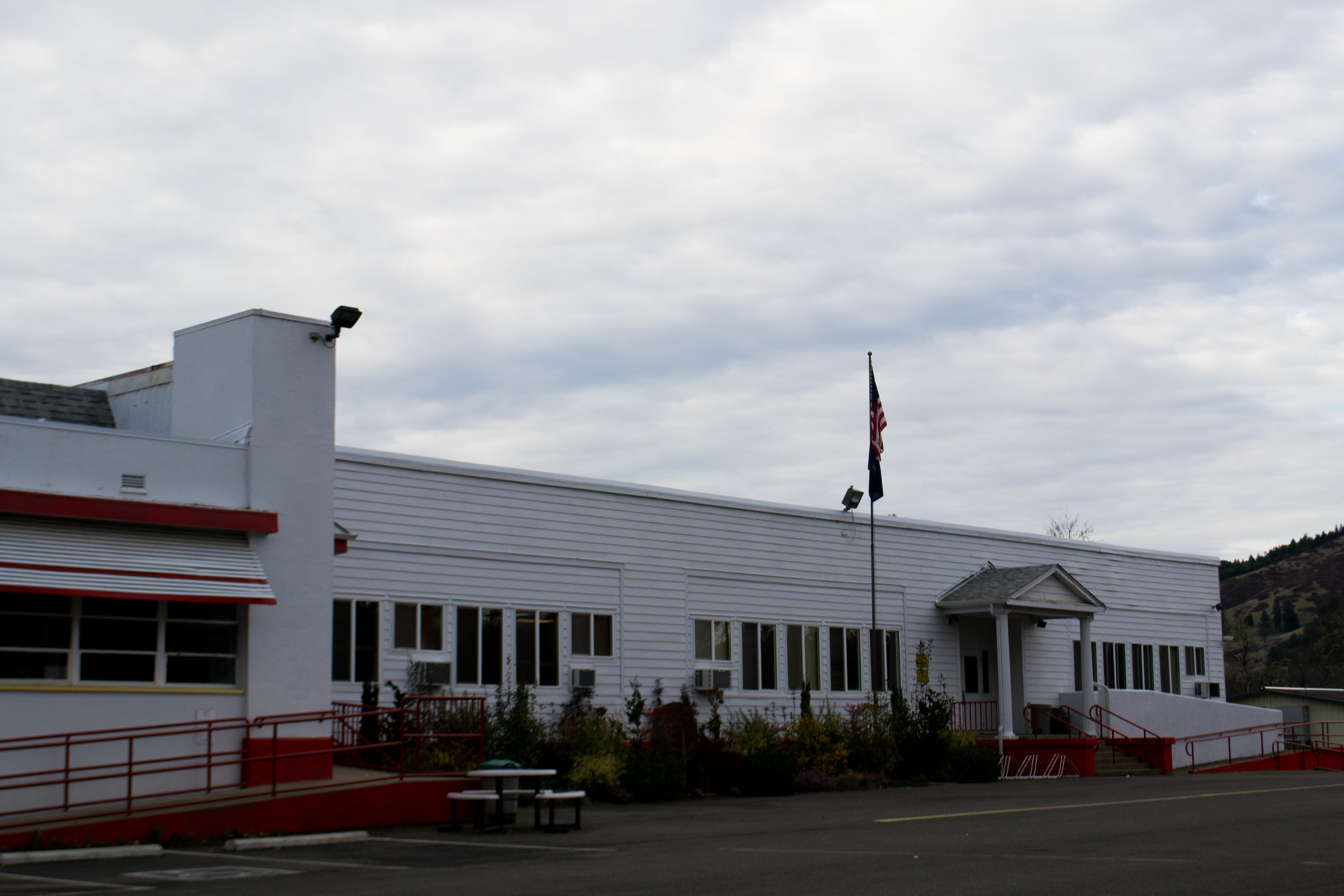

Location
- 11381 Tiller Trail Highway; Days Creek, Douglas County, Oregon 97429; United States; 42.971118°N 123.162687°W

Information
- Type: Public charter
- School district: Days Creek School District
- Superintendent: Steve Woods
- Staff: 19.83 (FTE)
- Grades: K-12
- Enrollment: 229 (2023-2024)
- Student to teacher ratio: 11.55
- Colors: Red, white, and gold
- Athletics conference: OSAA Skyline League 1A-4
- Mascot: Wolves

Days Creek Charter School is a public charter school in Days Creek, Oregon, United States.

== Academics ==
In 2008, 71% of the school's seniors received their high school diploma. Of 21 students, 15 graduated, 3 dropped out, and 3 are still in high school.
