= Nestucca High School =

Nestucca Valley Jr./Sr. High School

Location
- 34660 Parkway Drive; Cloverdale, (Tillamook County), Oregon 97112; United States; 45.204088°N 123.888788°W

Information
- Type: Public
- School district: Nestucca Valley School District
- Principal: Peter Deam
- Staff: 13.55 (FTE)
- Grades: 7-12
- Enrollment: 162 (2024–2025)
- Student to teacher ratio: 11.96
- Colors: Orange, black, and white
- Athletics conference: OSAA Northwest League 2A-1
- Mascot: Bobcat

Nestucca High School is a public high school in Cloverdale, Oregon, United States. The Nestucca Valley School District #101 (NVSD) is located in south Tillamook County and includes the following communities: Beaver, Hebo, Cloverdale, Pacific City/Woods, Sandlake and Neskowin. It is the only high school in the Nestucca Valley SD 101. In 2009, the Nestucca Valley Middle School was closed down and the 7th and 8th grade students were moved into the high school building, renaming it the Nestucca Valley Jr./Sr. High School. The middle school was restored shortly after, in early 2021, thus separating the two schools. As of the 2026 school year, roughly 162 students attend Nestucca High School, employing 14 full time teachers with a student to teacher ratio of 12 to 1.

== Academics ==
Nestucca High School is ranked 112th within Oregon. Advanced Placement coursework and exams are offered and the AP participation rate at Nestucca High School is 8%. In 2019, minority enrollment was listed at 30% and 61% of students are identified as economically disadvantaged. Twenty to 24% of students are achieving proficiency in Math (which is lower than the Oregon state average of 43%) for the 2015–16 school year. Sixty to 64% of students are achieving proficiency in Reading/Language Arts (which is higher than the Oregon state average of 57%) for the 2015–16 school year. Nestucca Valley Jr./Sr. High School placed in the bottom 50% of all schools in Oregon for overall test scores (math proficiency is bottom 50%, and reading proficiency is top 50%) for the 2015–16 school year.

In 2008, 85% of the school's seniors received a high school diploma. Of 59 students, 50 graduated, four dropped out, four received a modified diploma, and one was still in high school the following year.
