= Southwest Christian School (Beaverton, Oregon) =

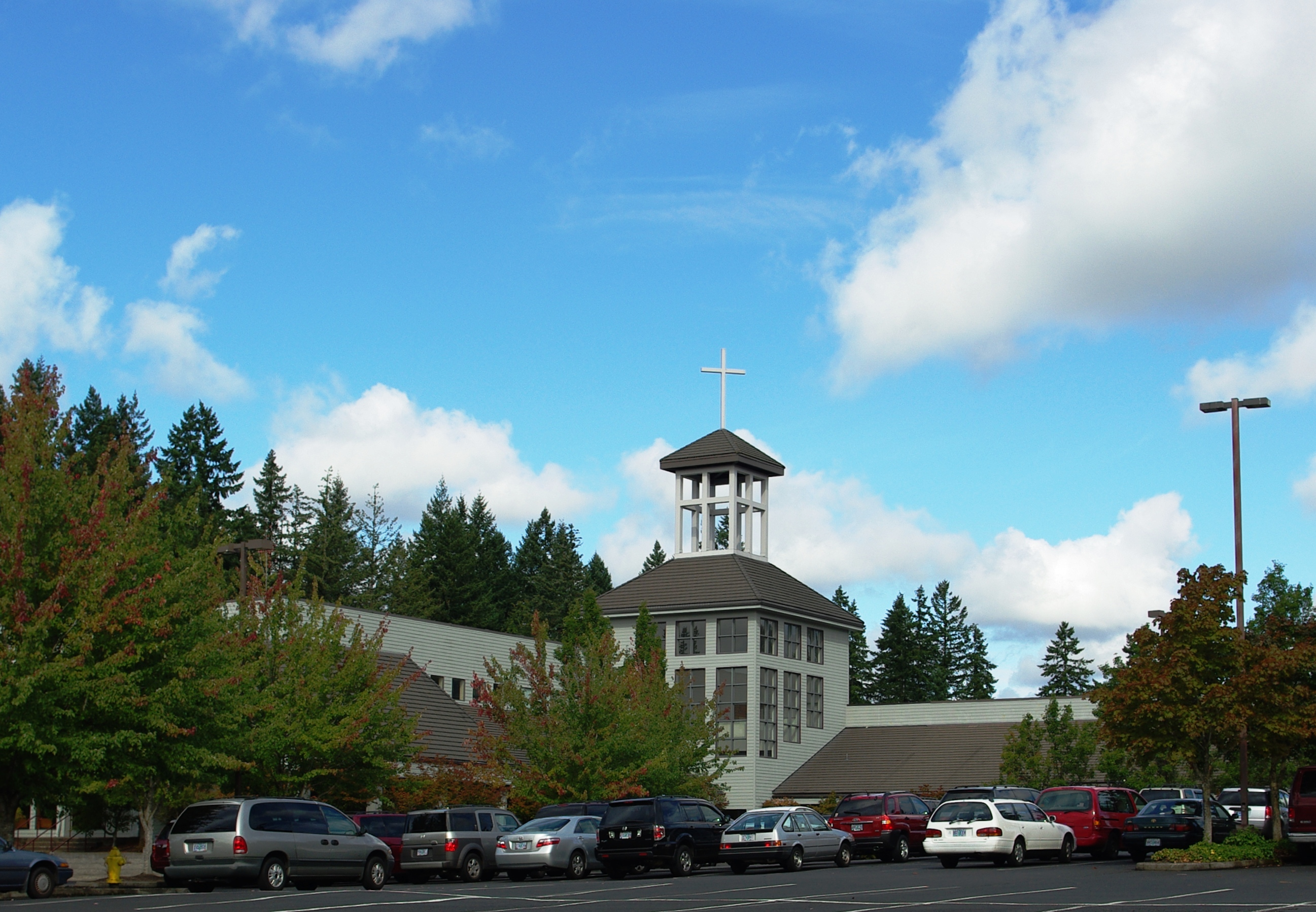

Location
- 14605 SW Weir Road; Beaverton, Washington County, Oregon 97007; United States; 45.448704°N 122.827079°W

Information
- Type: Private
- Opened: 1973
- Principal: Mark Sherman
- Grades: K-12
- Enrollment: 241
- Colors: Royal blue, Columbia blue, and white
- Athletics conference: OSAA The Valley 10 League 1A-1
- Mascot: Wildcats
- Newspaper: The Pen and Prowl
- Affiliation: Christian
- Website: scswildcats.org

Southwest Christian School is a private Christian K-12 grade school, middle school & high school in Beaverton, Oregon, United States.
