= Umpqua Valley Christian School =

Location
- 18585 Dixonville Rd. Winston, (Douglas County), Oregon 97470; United States; 43.114908°N 123.414933°W

Information
- Type: Private Christian
- Religious affiliation: Christian
- Opened: 1974
- CEEB code: 380999
- NCES School ID: 01931833
- Principal: Julie Cherry
- Grades: K-12
- Enrollment: 275
- Colors: Purple, gold, and white
- Athletics conference: OSAA Skyline League 1A-4
- Mascot: Monarch
- Accreditation: ACSI, AdvancED
- Affiliation: ACE
- Website: www.uvcs.org
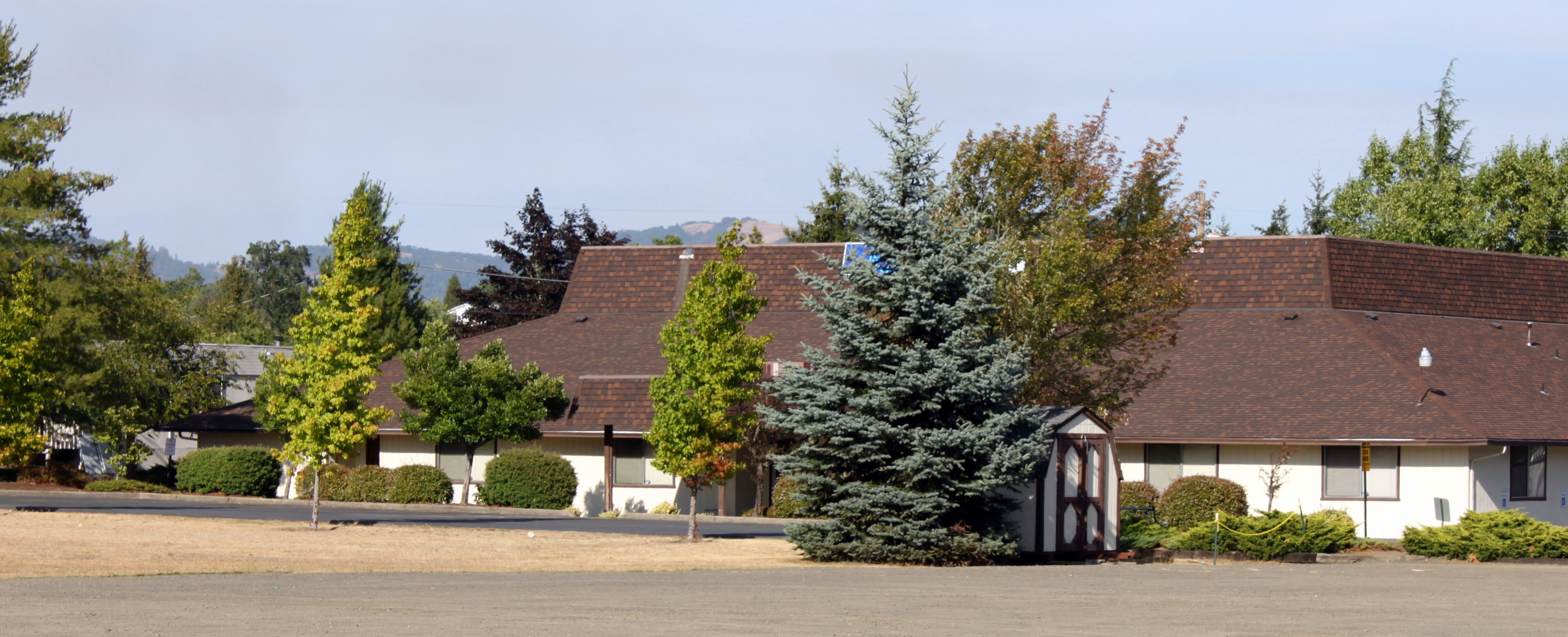

Umpqua Valley Christian School is a private Christian school located in Winston, Oregon, United States supporting the education of grades K-12 on a single campus. The school has been a member of the Association of Christian Schools International since 2003, and was accredited by Northwest Accreditation Commission in 2004 and again by AdvancED after merging with NWAC in 2012.
