= Myrtle Point High School =

Location
- 717 4th Street; Myrtle Point, Coos County, Oregon 97458; United States
- Coordinates: 43.061189°N 124.142976°W

Information
- Type: Public
- School district: Myrtle Point School District
- Principal: Kayli Fandel
- Teaching staff: 9.96 (FTE)
- Grades: 7–12
- Enrollment: 154 (2024–2025)
- Student to teacher ratio: 15.46
- Colors: Red, blue, and white
- Athletics conference: OSAA Sunset Conference 2A-4
- Mascot: Bobcat
- Team name: Bobcats
- Website: www.mpsd.k12.or.us/mphs
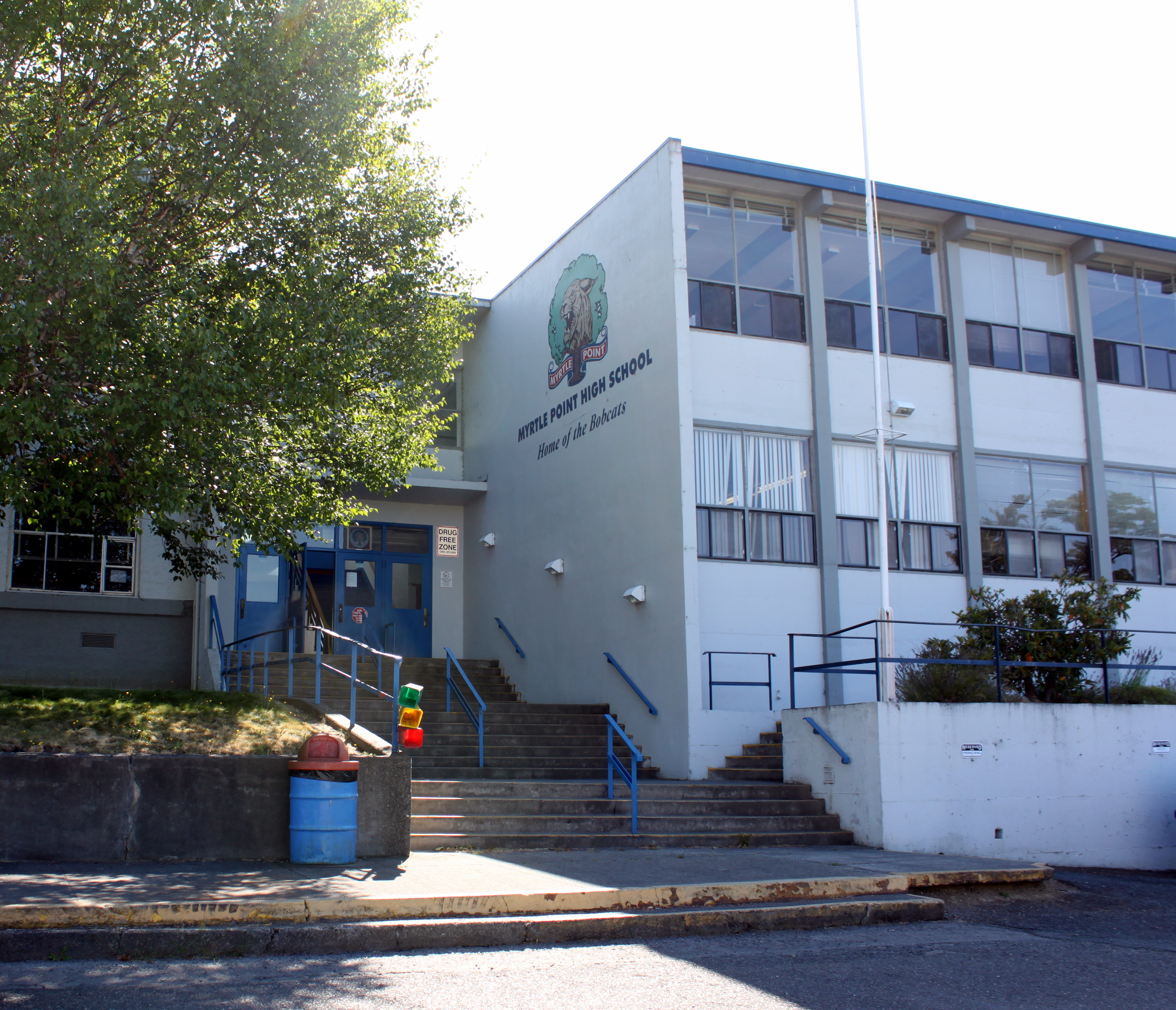

Myrtle Point High School is a public high school and junior high in Myrtle Point, Oregon, United States.

== Students ==
According to the National Center for Education Statistics, Myrtle Point High School enrolled 191 students across grades 7–12 in the 2021–2022 school year.

== Academics ==
In 2018, 66% of the school's seniors received their high school diploma on time.
