= Butte Falls Secondary School =

School in Oregon

Location
- 625 Fir Street; Butte Falls, Jackson County, Oregon 97522; United States; 42.541768°N 122.566904°W

Information
- Type: Public
- School district: Butte Falls School District
- Superintendent: Rich Sullivan
- Principal: Deidre Pearson
- Grades: 8-12
- Enrollment: 40
- Colors: Green and white
- Athletics conference: OSAA Mountain Valley League 1A-5
- Mascot: Logger

Butte Falls Secondary School is a public high school in Butte Falls, Oregon, United States.

== Academics ==
In 2025, 100% of the school's seniors received their high school diploma. Of 10 students, 7 graduated, 0 dropped out, and three received a modified diploma.

== Natural Resource Center ==
All students who attend Butte Falls Charter School are able to actively participate in programs that are offered at the Natural Resource Center (or NRC). This center was once a state-run fish hatchery, that has since been converted into a plethora of outdoor learning opportunities for students of all ages. Annually, the NRC hosts a Fall Festival of Learning around the end of September and an annual Earth Day Celebration in the middle of April. Both events feature secondary school students teaching and leading primary students. The facility is overseen by high school science and social science teacher, Ben DeCarlow.
