= Lowell Junior/Senior High School =

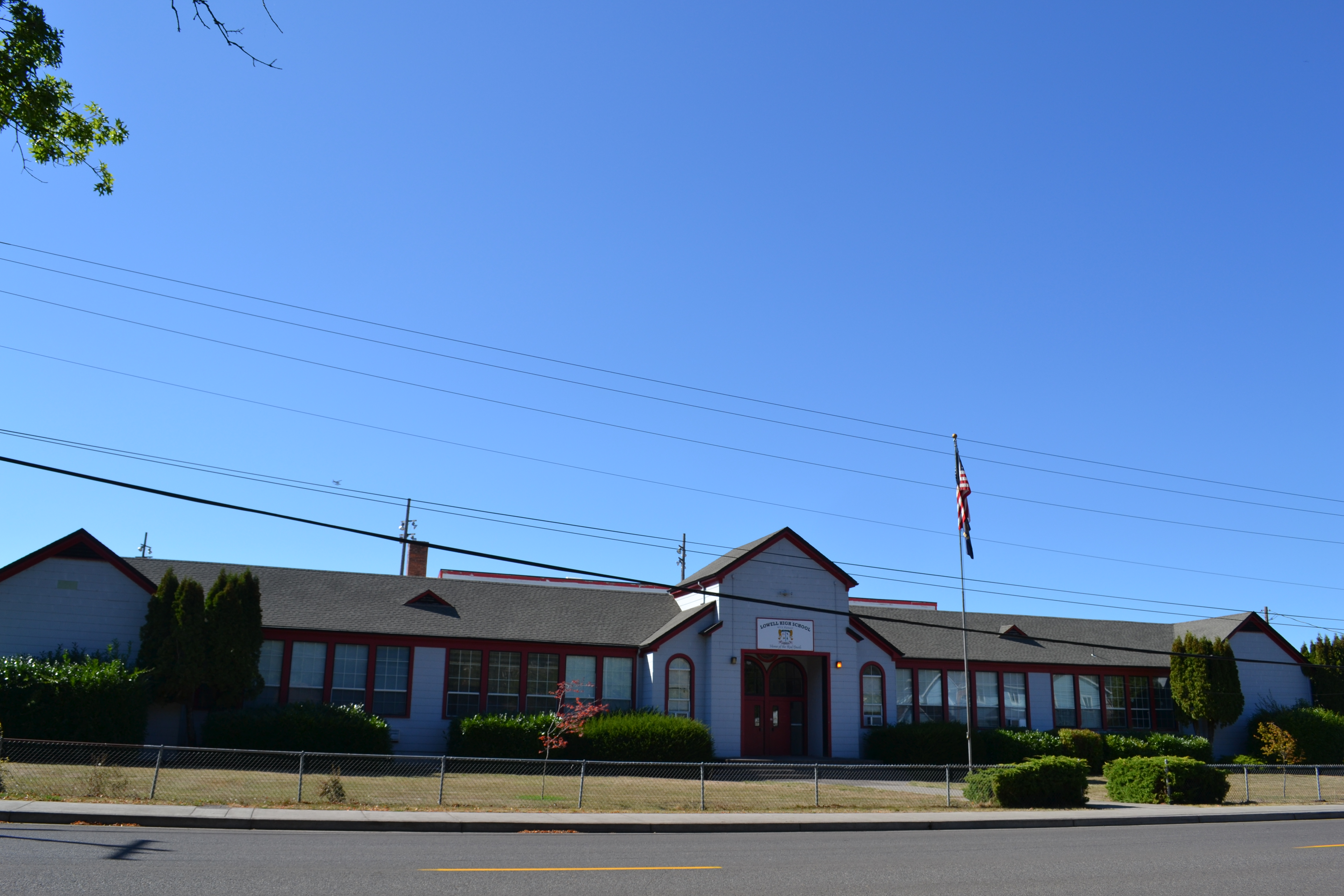

Location
- 65 S Pioneer Street; Lowell, (Lane County), Oregon 97452; United States; 43.917219°N 122.781084°W

Information
- Type: Public
- School district: Lowell School District
- Principal: Joshua Metzger
- Teaching staff: 11.67 (FTE)
- Grades: 7–12
- Enrollment: 178 (2024-2025)
- Student to teacher ratio: 15.25
- Colors: Red, white, and black
- Athletics conference: OSAA Central Valley League 2A-3
- Mascot: Devil
- Team name: Lowell Red Devils
- Website: Lowell Junior/Senior High School

Lowell Junior/Senior High School is a public junior/senior high school in Lowell, Oregon, United States. It serves grades 7-12.

== Academics ==
In 2017, 88% of the school's seniors received a high school diploma.
