= Salem Academy Christian Schools =

Location
- 942 Lancaster Drive NE; Salem, Marion County, Oregon 97301; United States
- Coordinates: 44.943059°N 122.98026°W

Information
- Type: Private Christian
- Opened: 1945
- Superintendent: Tim Peterson
- Principal: Lindsy Brownell
- Grades: PreK-12
- Enrollment: 724
- Colors: Dark green and white
- Athletics conference: OSAA Pac-West Conference 3A
- Mascot: Crusaders
- Accreditation: ACSI, NAAS
- Affiliation: Christian
- Website: salemacademy.org

Salem Academy Christian Schools is a private Christian school in Salem, Oregon, United States.

The school has been accredited by the Association of Christian Schools International since 2003, and by the Northwest Association of Accredited Schools since 1959.

== Notable alumni ==
Grayson Boucher, Street Basketball Player "The Professor" And1 Mix Tape Tour
