= Stanfield Secondary School =

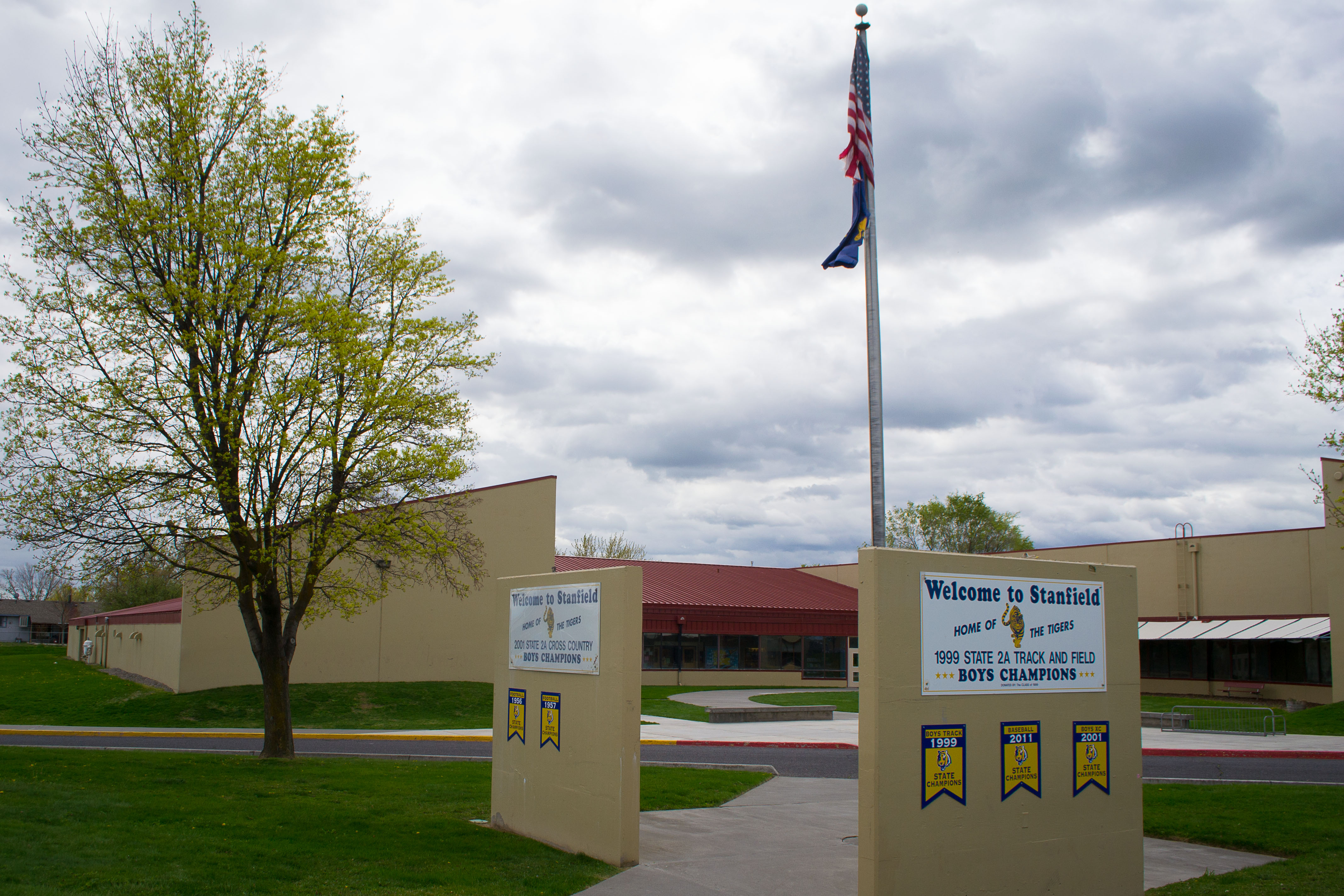

Location
- 1120 N Main Street; Stanfield, Umatilla County, Oregon 97875; United States; 45.790175°N 119.223676°W

Information
- Type: Public
- School district: Stanfield School District
- Principal: Beth Burton
- Grades: 6-12
- Enrollment: 249
- Colors: Royal blue and athletic gold
- Athletics conference: OSAA Columbia Basin Conference 2A-5
- Mascot: Tigers
- Rival: Heppner Mustangs
- Website: Stanfield Secondary School website

Stanfield Secondary School is a public high school in Stanfield, Oregon, United States.

== Academics ==
Stanfield Secondary School and Stanfield Elementary are both classified as being Outstanding according to the 2011-2012 state report card. In 2008, 64% of the school's seniors received their high school diploma. Of 33 students, 21 graduated, 7 dropped out and 5 remained in high school. Stanfield offers its students dual-credit classes through Eastern Oregon University, and BMCC. They can also take a various amount of classes through expanded options. They offer their students Acellus for independent study.

== Athletics ==
Stanfield is very well known for its baseball program, coached under Bryan Johnson. Under the 10 years Johnson was coach, the Tigers went 201–81. They captured five league titles, five district titles, four state final four appearances, and two state championships. In 2011, Stanfield captured the OSAA 2A state championship. In 2016, they defeated the #1 ranked seed Santiam Christian 5-4 and garnered the OSAA 3A state title.

Stanfield's football program won the state title in 1956 and 1957, respectively. Under head coach Davy Salas, the Tigers have been a very competitive opponent across the state. In 2015, Stanfield made a cinderella run to the state semi-finals as the #9 seed. They ultimately fell to the Kennedy Trojans 20–34. In 2016, the Stanfield Tigers made the state championship game as the #2 seed. In the game, they were pitted against the Regis Rams, who they had beaten earlier in the season 20–14. However, ultimately in the championship game Regis defeated Stanfield by the score of 53–14. The 59 year championship drought continues.

The Tigers have a very well respected basketball program. Under the tutelage of head coach Daniel Sharp, the Tigers made 6 state tournament appearances out of the 8 years he was coach, including a 2013 3rd place state finish, the best in program history. Sharp ended his tenure as boys head coach in 2015. The boys have yet to reach the state tournament since.

The Stanfield lady Tigers were 1–23 in the 2013–2014 season. However, in the 2014–2015 season Daniel Sharp began his tenure as head coach and turned the lady Tigers around. He coached them to a 10–15 record, which garnered him 2014-2015 the Columbia Basin Conference coach of the year. The lady Tigers were 10–13 in the 2015–2016 season.

The Stanfield boys cross country team won its only state title in 2001.

The Stanfield boys track team won its only state title in 1999.
