= Joseph High School =

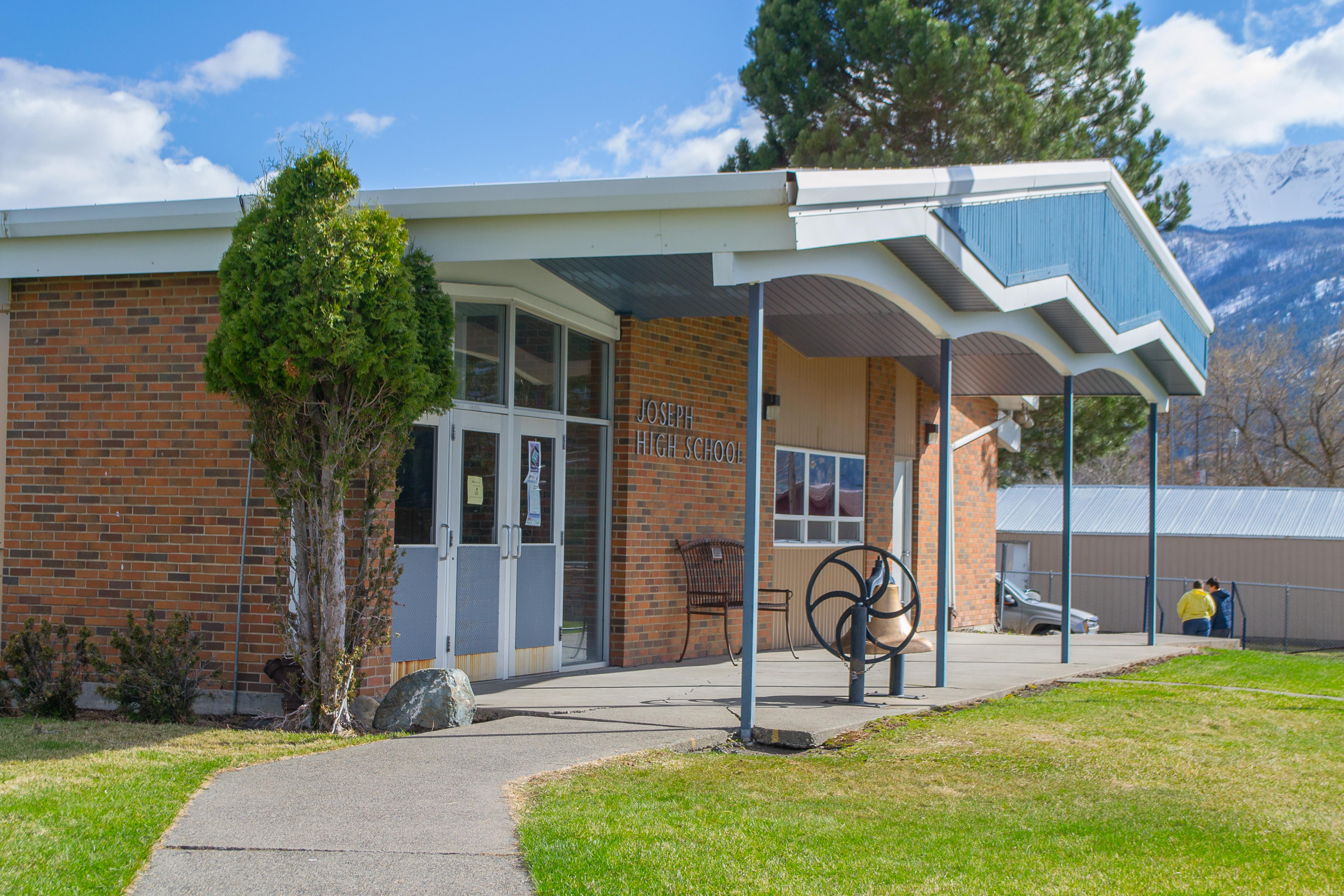

Location
- 400 E Williams Avenue; Joseph, (Wallowa County), Oregon 97846; United States
- Coordinates: 45.352507°N 117.222611°W

Information
- Type: Public
- School district: Joseph School District
- Principal: Sherri Kilgore
- Grades: K-12
- Enrollment: 273 (2023-2024)
- Colors: Blue and gold
- Athletics conference: OSAA Old Oregon League 1A-7
- Mascot: Eagle
- Rival: North Powder
- Website: www.joseph.k12.or.us/JHS

Joseph High School is a public high school in Joseph, Oregon, United States.

== Academics ==
In 2008, 100% of the school's seniors received a high school diploma. Of 21 students, 21 graduated and none dropped out.
