= Alsea High School =

Public school in Oregon, United States

Alsea School
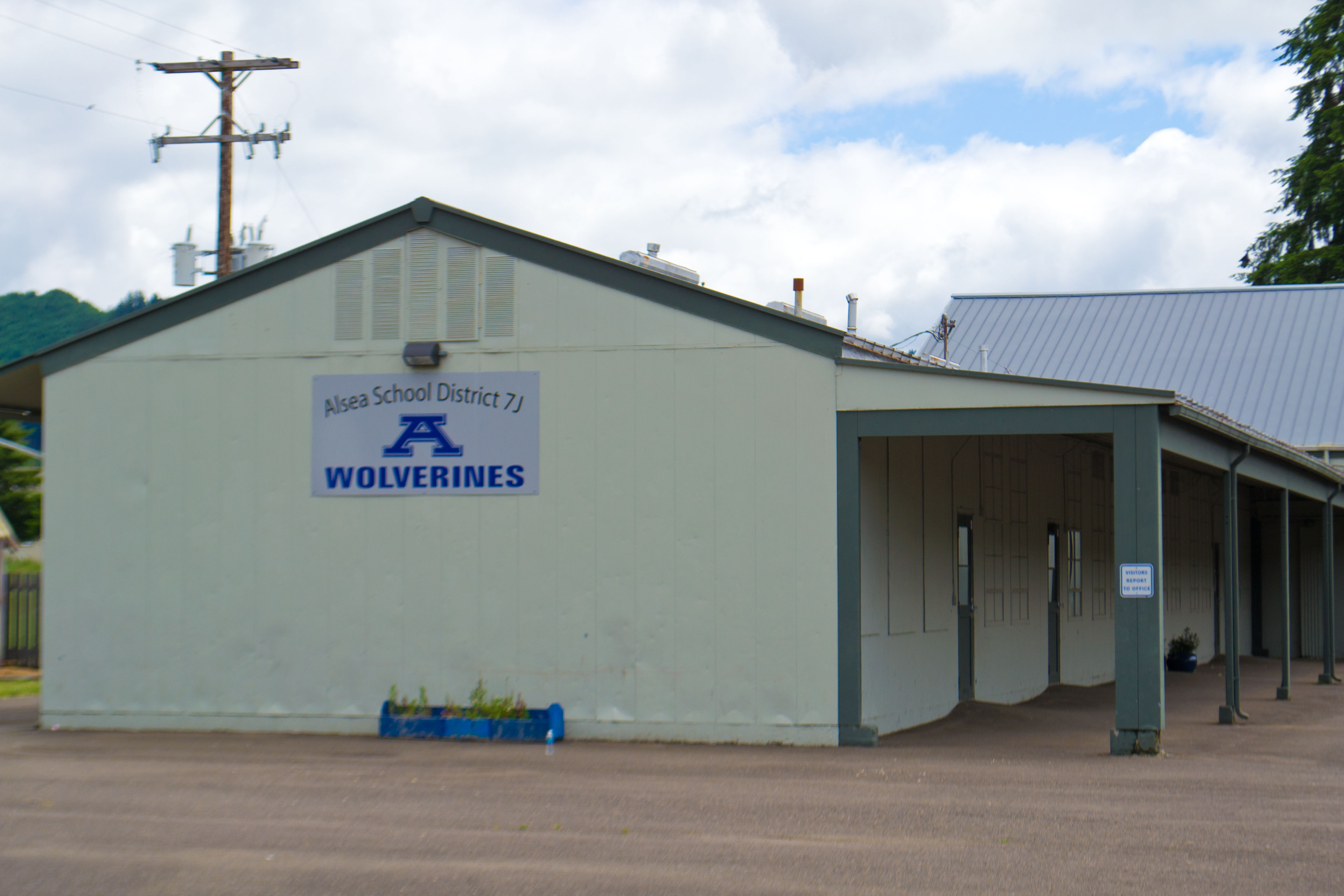

Location
- 301 S 3rd Street; Alsea, (Benton County), Oregon 97324; United States; 44.380816°N 123.594679°W

Information
- Type: Public
- School district: Alsea School District
- Principal: Sean Gallagher
- Teaching staff: 19.00 (FTE)
- Grades: K-12
- Enrollment: 281 (2023–2024)
- Student to teacher ratio: 14.79
- Campus: Rural
- Colors: Royal blue and white
- Athletics conference: OSAA Mountain West League 1A-3
- Mascot: Wolverine
- Team name: Wolverines
- Rival: Eddyville Charter

Alsea High School is a public high school in Alsea, Oregon, United States.

== Recent achievements ==
In 2008, 100% of the school's seniors received their high school diploma. Of 12 students, 12 graduated and none dropped out.

== Athletics ==
Eddyville Charter School is the local athletic rival, linked by their timber industry heritage to the Mary's Peak region.

=== State Championships ===
- Boys Basketball: 1962
- Football: 1958, 1972
- Girls Track and Field: 1996
