= North Douglas High School =

Location
- 305 S. Main Street; Drain, (Douglas County), Oregon 97435; United States; 43.660058°N 123.312886°W

Information
- Type: Public
- School district: North Douglas School District
- Principal: Terry Duncan
- Teaching staff: 7.80 (FTE)
- Grades: 9-12
- Enrollment: 82 (2017–18)
- Student to teacher ratio: 10.51
- Colors: Cardinal and white
- Athletics conference: OSAA Mountain View Conference 2A-2
- Mascot: Warrior
- Website: North Douglas HS website

North Douglas High School is a public high school in Drain, Oregon, United States.

The elementary school scenes in the 1992 sci-fi disaster movie Disaster in Time (also known as Timescape or The Grand Tour) were filmed at North Douglas High School.

== Academics ==
In 2008, 83% of the school's seniors received their high school diploma. Of 23 students, 19 graduated, two dropped out, one received a modified diploma, and one was still in high school the following year.

== Mascot ==
In compliance with state law, the "Warriors" name will be retained, but the mascot "Willie the Warrior" will be retired at the end of the 2016 school year and other Native American imagery will be removed.
