= Pine Eagle Charter School =

Location
- Halfway, Baker, Oregon 97834; United States
- Coordinates: 44.8827°N 117.116°W

Information
- School type: Charter School
- Motto: Be Safe, Be Respectful, Be Responsible.
- School district: Pine Eagle School District
- Superintendent: Cammie DeCastro
- NCES School ID: 410972000016
- Principal: Morgan Gover
- Grades: 9-12
- Enrollment: 188 (2014)
- Colors: Red, white and blue
- Athletics conference: OSAA
- Mascot: Spartans
- Website: official site

Pine Eagle Charter School is a public charter school located in Halfway, Baker County, Oregon. It is a K–12 public school and only school in the Pine Eagle School District.

== Academics ==
In 2008, 86% of the school's seniors received their high school diploma. Of 22 students, 19 graduated, 2 dropped out, and 1 are still in high school.

Pine Eagle Charter School offers multiple dual credit courses in Career and Technical Education, Biology, Writing, Composition, Calculus, Speech, Chemistry, Early Childhood Development and Spanish, also provide students with access to online college courses. With these available courses, students can earn the equivalent to an Associate degree. The school also provides students with hands on experience in the building trades, electronic control systems, Early Childhood Education, and computer programing.

== Shooting drill ==
On April 26, 2013, two masked men wearing hoodies burst into the school conference room and pretended to open fire. It was a surprise drill designed to test the school's preparation for an assault by active shooters. On April 20, 2015, a teacher at the school filed a federal lawsuit, alleging that the drill caused her to have posttraumatic stress disorder.
