= Prospect Charter School =

Location
- 160 Mill Creek Drive; Prospect, (Jackson County), Oregon 97536; United States; 42.709929°N 122.579283°W

Information
- Type: Public
- School district: Prospect School District
- Principal: Tim Dexter
- Teaching staff: 17.97 (FTE)
- Grades: K-12
- Enrollment: 220 (2023-2024)
- Student to teacher ratio: 12.24
- Colors: Blue and white
- Athletics conference: OSAA Mountain Valley League 1A-5
- Mascot: Cougar
- Website: Prospect Charter School

Prospect Charter School is a public charter school in Prospect, Oregon, United States.

== Charter status ==
Prospect applied for charter status, and received a $455,000 Charter Incentive Grant from the Oregon Department of Education in December 2008. It began the 2009–2010 school year as a charter school.

== Academics ==
In 2008, 56% of the school's seniors received a high school diploma. Of 16 students, nine graduated, five dropped out, and two were still in high school the following year.
