= St. Paul High School (Oregon) =

Public school in St. Paul, Oregon, United States

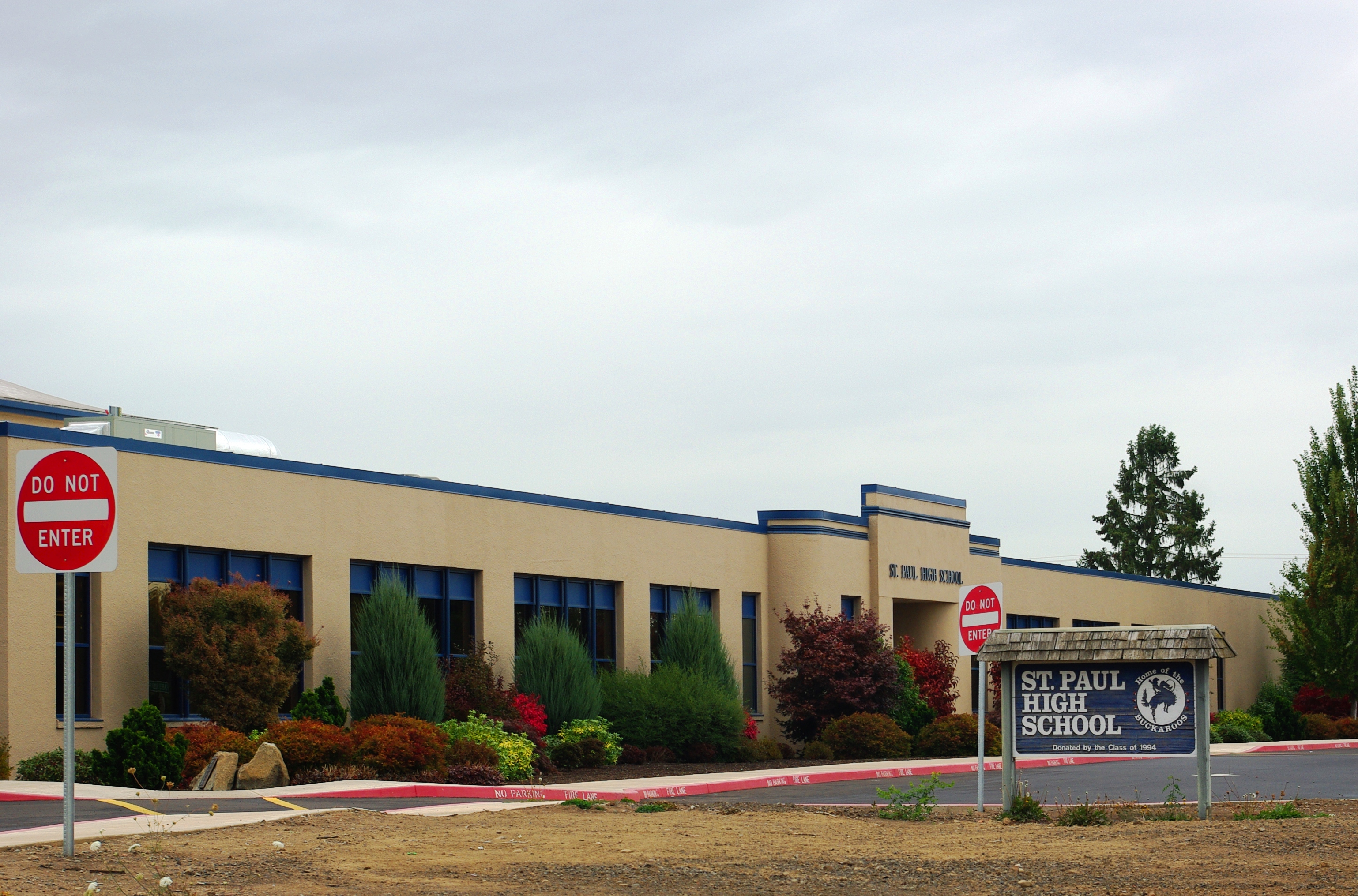

Location
- 20449 Main Street NE; St. Paul, Oregon, (Marion County) 97137; United States; 45.2139°N 122.9755°W

Information
- Type: Public
- School district: St. Paul School District
- Principal: Tiffany Fotre
- Grades: 7-12
- Enrollment: 103
- Colors: Blue and white
- Athletics conference: OSAA Casco League 1A-2
- Mascot: Buckaroo
- Website: www.stpaul.k12.or.us

St. Paul High School is a public high school in St. Paul, Oregon, United States.

== Academics ==
In 2008, 83% of the school's seniors received a high school diploma. Of 18 students, 15 graduated and three dropped out.
