= Burnt River School =

Location
- 201 S First Avenue; Unity, (Baker County), Oregon 97884; United States; 44.439799°N 118.192323°W

Information
- Type: Public
- School district: Burnt River School District
- Principal: Louise Lyon
- Grades: K-12
- Enrollment: 47
- Colors: Blue and gold
- Athletics conference: OSAA High Desert League 1A-8
- Mascot: Bull

Burnt River School is a public K–12 school in Unity, Oregon, United States. It is the only school in the Burnt River School District.

== Academics ==
In 2008, 100% of the school's seniors received a high school diploma. Of seven students, all seven graduated and none dropped out.
