= Echo School (Oregon) =

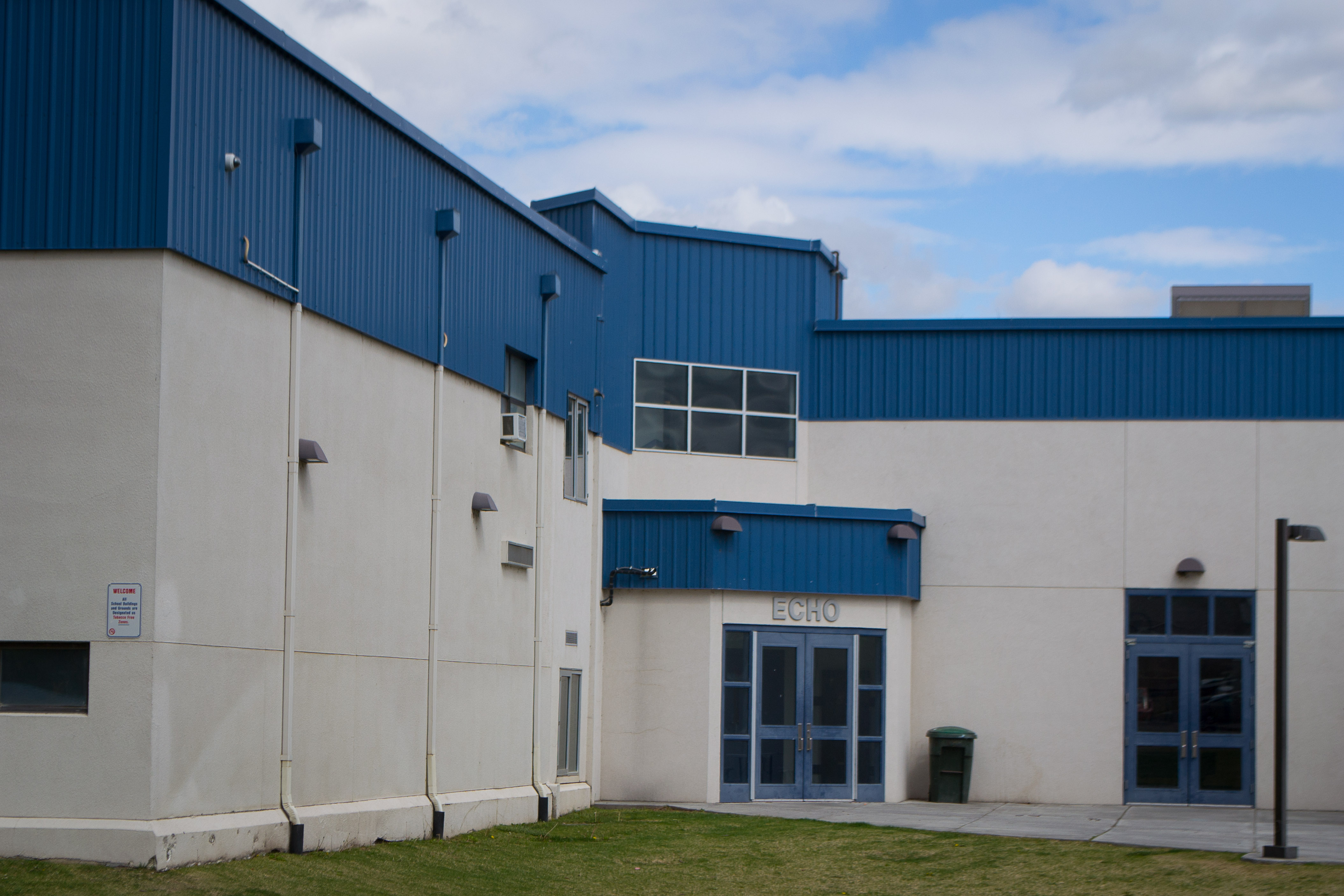

Location
- 600 Gerone Street; Echo, Umatilla County, Oregon 97826; United States; 45.74004°N 119.189708°W

Information
- Type: Public
- School district: Echo School District
- Principal: Keith Holman
- Grades: K-12
- Enrollment: 271
- Colors: Navy blue and vegas gold
- Athletics conference: OSAA Old Oregon League 1A-7
- Mascot: Cougars
- Website: www.echo.k12.or.us

Echo School is a public high school in Echo, Oregon, United States.

== Academics ==
In 2008, 91% of the school's seniors received their high school diploma. Of 22 students, 20 graduated, 1 dropped out, and 1 received a modified diploma.
