= Damascus Christian School =

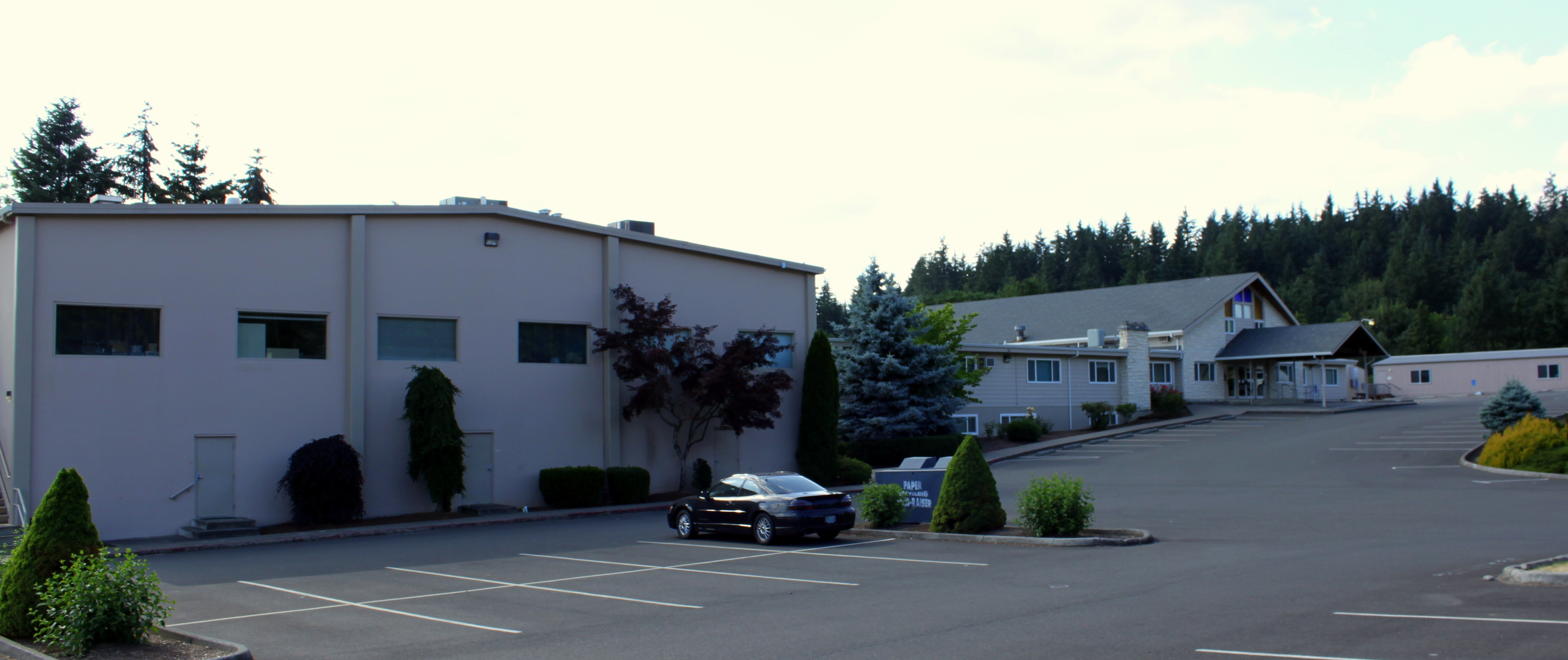

Location
- 14251 SE Rust Way; Damascus, Clackamas County, Oregon 97089; United States
- Coordinates: 45.419127°N 122.449681°W

Information
- Type: Private
- Principal: Zachary Davidson
- Grades: K-12
- Enrollment: 259
- Colors: Maroon and gold
- Athletics conference: OSAA The Valley 10 League 1A-1
- Mascot: Eagles
- Accreditation: ACSI, NAAS
- Affiliation: Christian
- Website: www.dcs4you.org/

Damascus Christian School is a private Christian school in Damascus, Oregon, United States.

Damascus Christian has been around since 1975, when it was founded by its first principal Tim Oakley. The school has also been accredited through the Association of Christian Schools International since 1978, and through the Northwest Association of Accredited Schools since 2005.

Damascus Christian is known for being one of the top Christian schools in the Clackamas/Sandy area. They hold weekly chapel services, have sports teams that frequently win 1A championships, and maintain a student body that is for the most part academically ahead of their public school peers.
