= Powder Valley School =

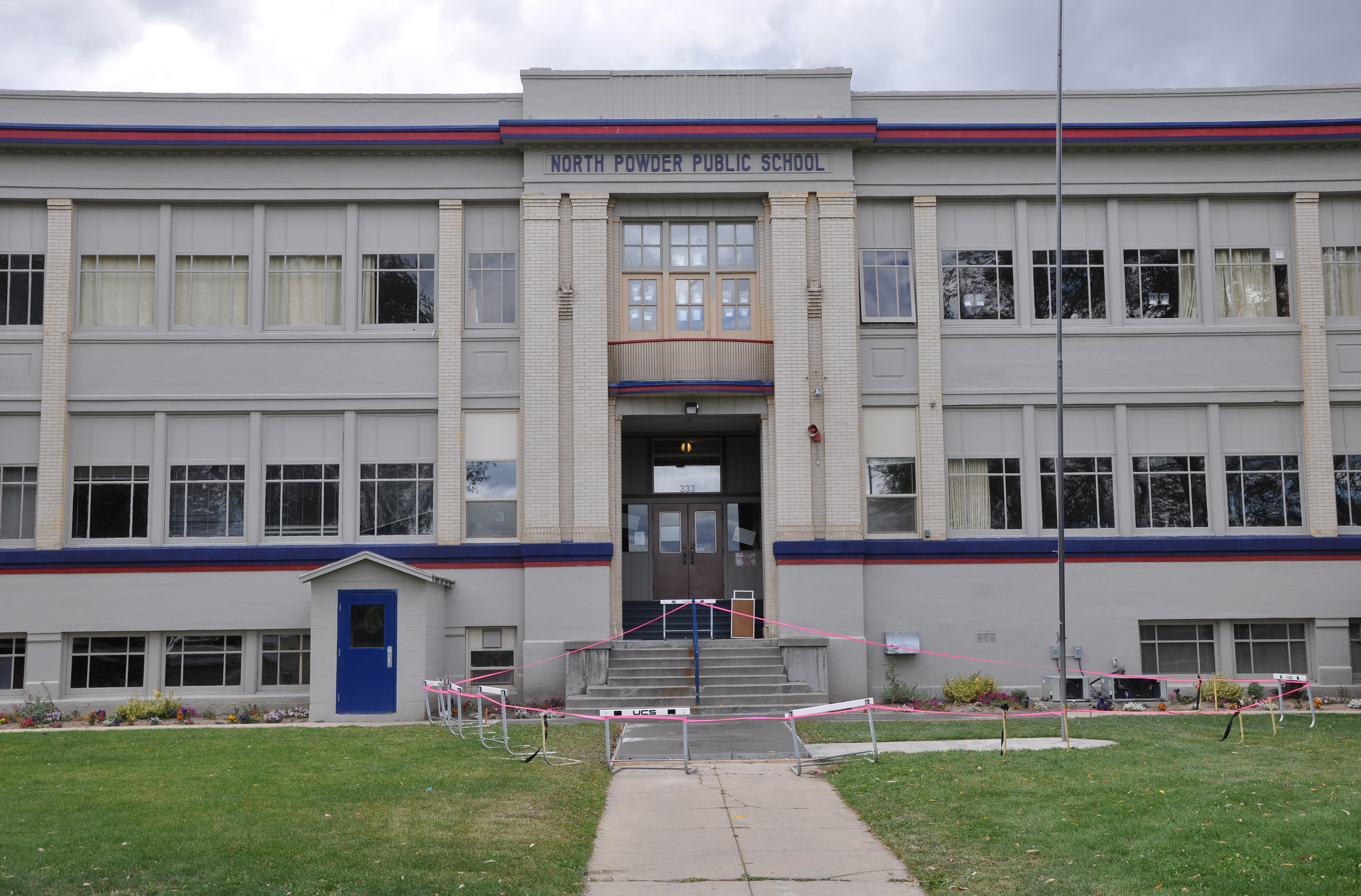

Location
- 333 G Street; North Powder, Oregon 97867; United States
- Coordinates: 45.027997°N 117.924768°W

Information
- Type: Public high school
- School district: North Powder School District
- NCES School ID: 410894001135
- Principal: Lance Dixon
- Teaching staff: 20.70 (on an FTE basis)
- Grades: KG–12
- Enrollment: 269 (2016-2017)
- Student to teacher ratio: 13.00
- Colors: Red, white, blue
- Athletics conference: OSAA Old Oregon League 1A-7
- Mascot: Badgers
- Website: www.npowder.k12.or.us

Powder Valley School is a K-12 public school in North Powder, Oregon, United States.

== Academics ==
In 2008, 89% of the school's seniors received their high school diploma. Of 18 students, 16 graduated and 2 dropped out.
