= Glide High School =

Public school in Glide, Oregon, United States

Location
- 18990 N Umpqua Hwy; Glide, (Douglas County), Oregon 97443; United States; 43.299654°N 123.096394°W

Information
- Type: Public
- Opened: 1952
- School district: Glide School District
- Principal: Kerry Dwight
- Teaching staff: 13.40 (FTE)
- Grades: 9-12
- Enrollment: 203 (2023–2024)
- Student to teacher ratio: 15.15
- Colors: Royal blue and gold
- Athletics conference: OSAA Sunset Conference 2A-4
- Mascot: Wildcat
- Team name: Wildcats
- Yearbook: Atoka
- Website: www.glide.k12.or.us

Glide High School (GHS) is a public high school in Glide, Oregon, United States. Glide offers numerous hands-on, career and college entry classes.

== July 2008 fire ==
On July 11–12, 2008, a fire destroyed one of the school's main buildings, which held the science lab, classrooms, the home economics area, and the library. Many classrooms, offices, the gymnasium, and a weight room were saved by firefighters from the Glide Volunteer Fire department and other nearby companies. The school district was already replacing or rehabilitating some of the areas to have classrooms ready for the fall 2008 term, which began in September. The fire was believed to be caused by a plumber's torch in a classroom of the main building.

== Academics ==
In 2020, 99% of the school's seniors received a high school diploma.

== Notable alumni ==
- Jerry Rust
