= Ione Community Charter School =

Location
- 445 Spring Street; Ione, (Morrow County), Oregon 97843; United States
- Coordinates: 45.498946°N 119.828476°W

Information
- School district: Ione School District
- Principal: Tracey Johnson
- Grades: K-12
- Enrollment: 127 (2023-2024)
- Colors: Cardinal and white
- Athletics conference: OSAA Big Sky League 1A-6
- Mascot: Cardinal
- Website: www.ione.k12.or.us

Ione Community Charter School is a public charter school in Ione, Oregon, United States.

== Academics ==
The Ione School District’s Class of 2025 achieved a 100% graduation rate.
