= Monroe High School (Monroe, Oregon) =

High school in Monroe, Oregon

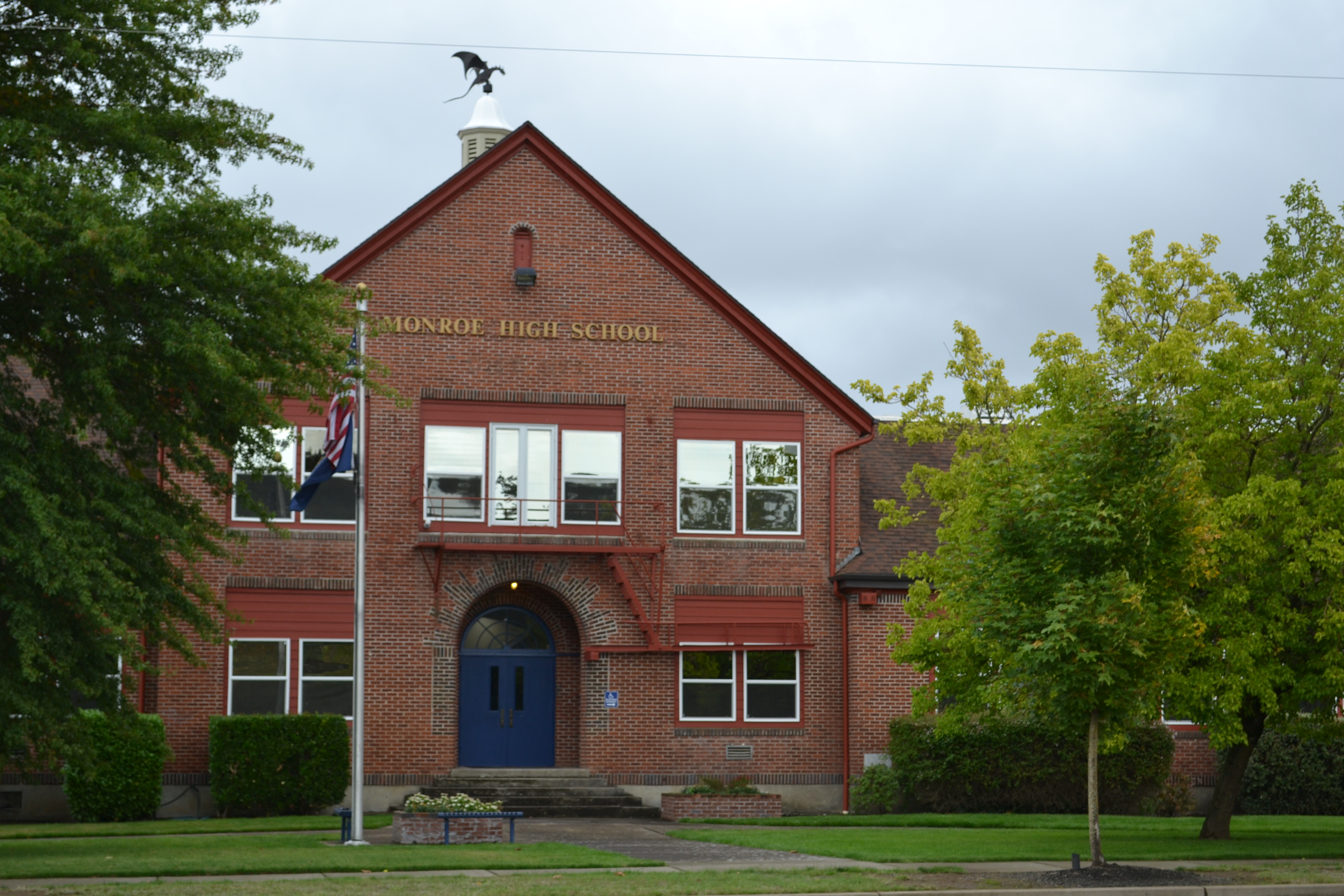

Location
- 365 N 5th Street; Monroe, (Benton County), Oregon 97456; United States
- Coordinates: 44.317872°N 123.297409°W

Information
- Type: Public
- School district: Monroe School District
- Principal: Beau Sisneros
- Teaching staff: 8.87 (FTE)
- Grades: 9-12
- Enrollment: 126 (2023–2024)
- Student to teacher ratio: 14.21
- Colors: Navy blue and burnt orange
- Athletics conference: OSAA Mountain View Conference 2A-2
- Mascot: Dragon

Monroe High School is a public high school in Monroe, Oregon, United States.

== Academics ==
In 2008, 75% of the school's seniors received a high school diploma. Of 28 students, 21 graduated, three dropped out, and four were still in high school the following year.

== Athletics ==
Monroe High School athletic teams compete in the OSAA 2A-3 Valley Coast Conference.

=== State championships ===
- Boy's Basketball: 1940
- Football: 1954, 1956, 2017 (Combine team with Triangle Lake)

== Notable alumni ==
- Dave Wolverton

== See also ==
- Washington-Monroe High School
