= Perrydale School =

Location
- 7445 Perrydale Road; Amity, Polk County, Oregon 97101; United States; 45°02′30″N 123°15′27″W

Information
- Type: Public
- School district: Perrydale School District
- Principal: Dan Dugan
- Grades: K-12
- Enrollment: 330
- Colors: Cardinal and black
- Athletics conference: OSAA Casco League 1A-2
- Mascot: Pirates
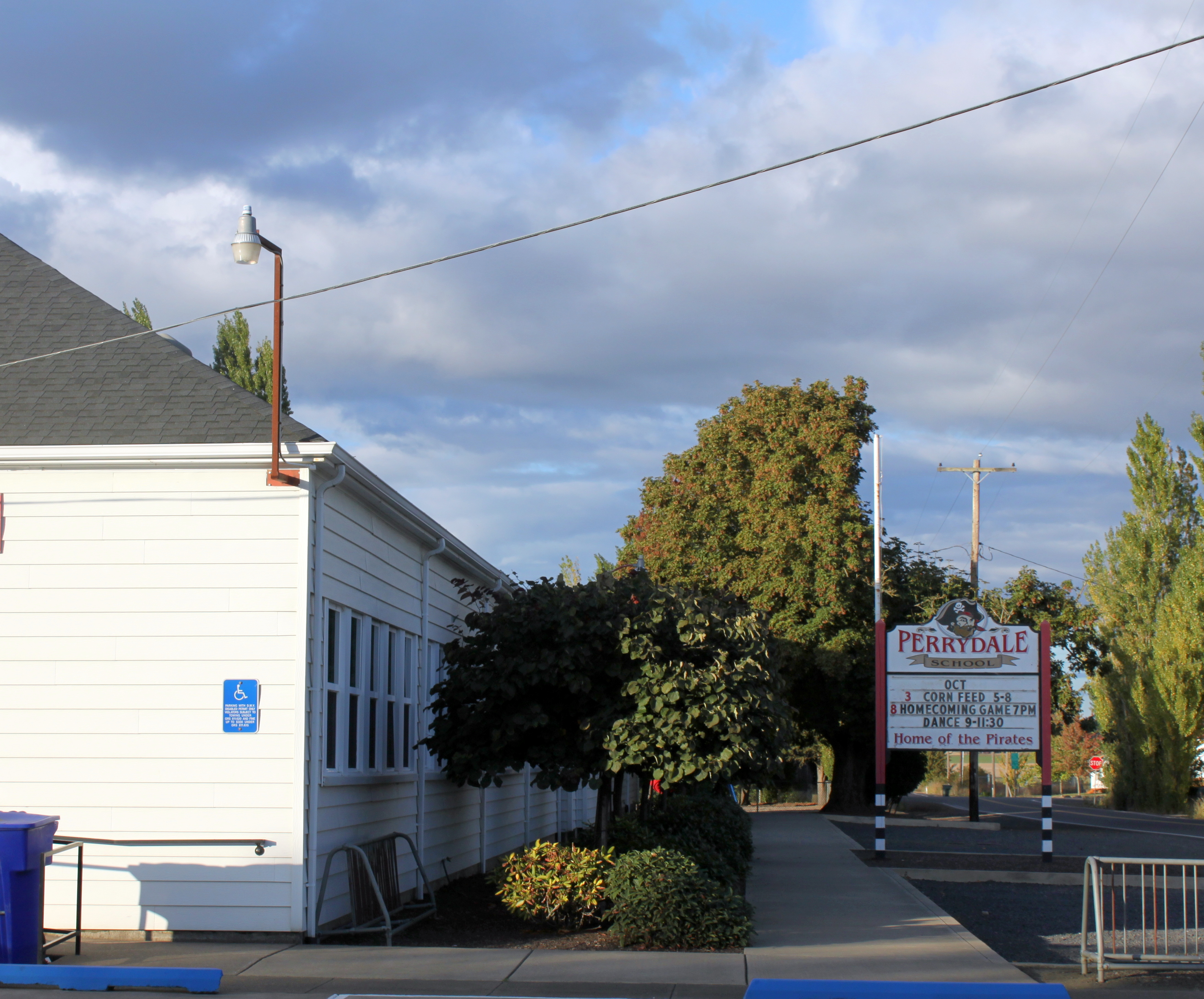

Perrydale School is a K-12 public school near Amity, Oregon, United States. It is the only school in the Perrydale School District.

== Academics ==
In 2013, 95% of the school's seniors received a diploma within 4 years. In 2008, 90% of the school's seniors received their high school diploma. Of 20 students, 18 graduated and 2 dropped out.

== Sports ==
In 2004, the Perrydale football team won the Oregon State 1A football championship. In 2005, the softball team won the State Softball title. In 2018, the girls basketball team took 5th place at the state tournament.

They play girls and boys basketball, boys football, and girls softball.
