= Western Christian School =

Location
- 9045 Wallace Road NW; Salem, Polk County, Oregon 97304; United States
- Coordinates: 45.065968°N 123.07654°W

Information
- Type: Private
- Opened: 1945
- School district: 2A
- Principal: Al Stefan
- Grades: K-12
- Enrollment: 175
- Colors: Royal blue and White
- Athletics conference: OSAA Tri-River Conference 2A-3
- Mascot: Pioneers
- Team name: Pioneers
- Accreditation: NAAS
- Affiliation: Christian
- Website: https://westernchristianschool.org/

Western Christian School is a private Christian school for grades K-12 located near Salem, Oregon, United States. The school was founded in 1945 and has been accredited by the Northwest Association of Accredited Schools since 1975. The school is located on a 45-acre campus just 9 miles north of West Salem and about 15 miles from McMinnville.

The school was known as Western Mennonite School until 2018.

Competing under the Oregon Schools Athletic Association (OSAA), the athletic teams consistently play in post-season games and move on to the State tournament. The boys' basketball team won the State 2A-3 Championship for the 2010–11 season, and the girls' basketball team won the State 2A Championship for the 2014–15 season.
