= Central Christian Schools =

Central Christian School
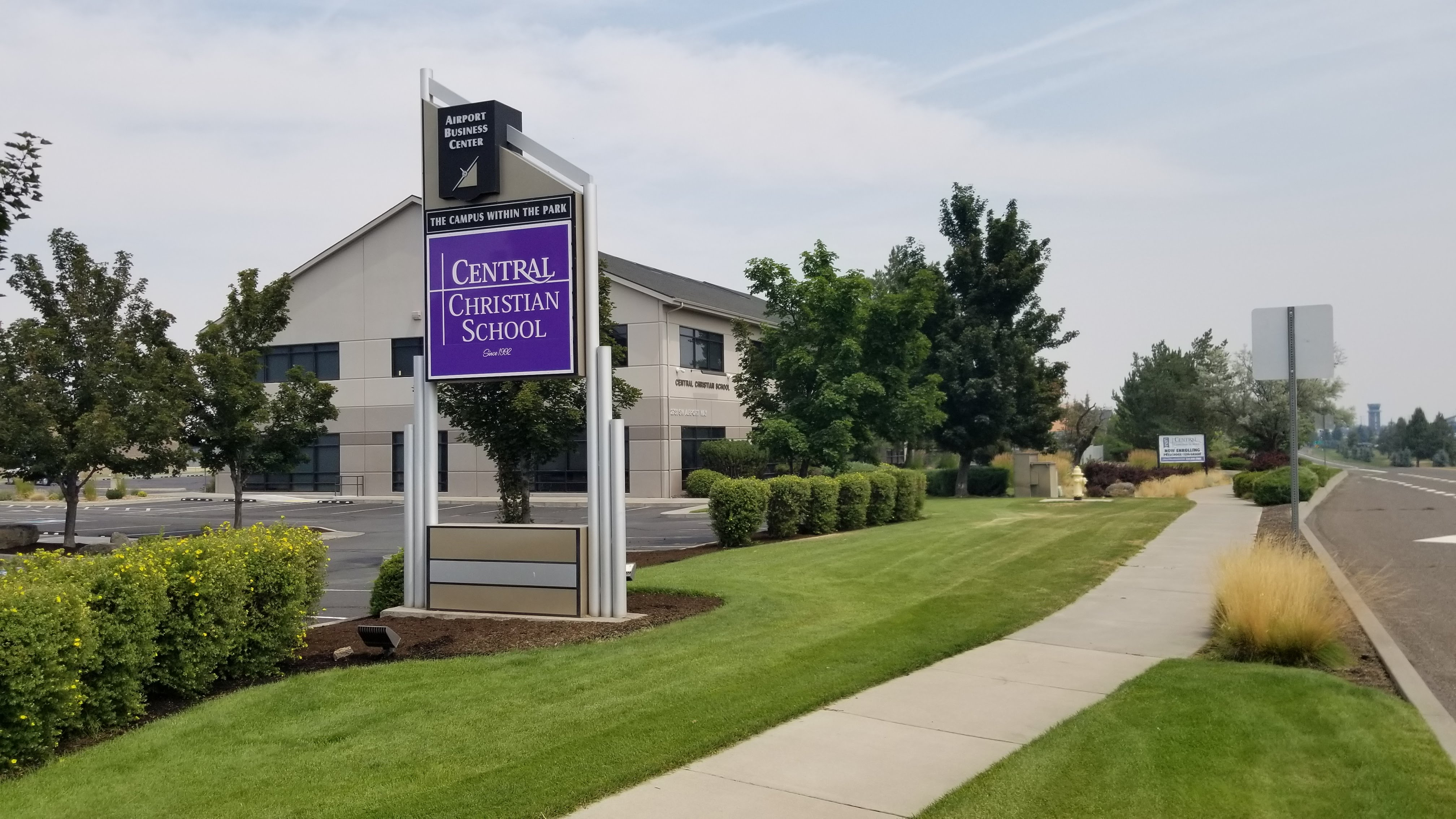
- Central Christian School in July, 2024.

Location
- 2731 SW Airport Way; Redmond, Deschutes County, Oregon 97756; United States; 44.255806°N 121.163082°W

Information
- Type: Private
- Opened: 1992
- Administrator: Elisa Carlson
- Grades: Pre K-12
- Enrollment: 277
- Colors: Purple, Black, and white
- Athletics conference: OSAA Mountain Valley 1A
- Team name: Tigers
- Accreditation: ACSI, NAAS
- Affiliation: Christian
- Website: www.centralchristianschools.com

Central Christian Schools is a private Christian school in Redmond, Oregon, United States. The school has been accredited through the Association of Christian Schools International since 1992, and through the Northwest Accreditation Commission since 2002. The Central Christian Tigers compete in the OSAA Mountain Valley 1A league. Central Christian opened in 1992.
