= Heppner Junior/Senior High School =

Location
- 710 NW Morgan Street; Heppner, (Morrow County), Oregon 97836; United States
- Coordinates: 45.361618°N 119.564885°W

Information
- Type: Public
- School district: Morrow County School District
- Principal: Matt Combe
- Grades: 7-12
- Enrollment: 155 (2023-2024)
- Colors: Royal blue and gold
- Athletics conference: OSAA Blue Mountain Conference 2A-5
- Mascot: Mustang
- Website: www.hhs.morrow.k12.or.us

Heppner Junior/Senior High School is a public high school in Heppner, Oregon, United States.

== Academics ==
In 2008, 93% of the school's seniors received a high school diploma. Of 46 students, 43 graduated, one dropped out, and two were still in high school the following year.

== Athletics ==
The Heppner High School football team entered the 2011 season having won 84 consecutive league games, an Oregon state record for all divisions. Their last loss was in 1998.
