= South Umpqua High School =

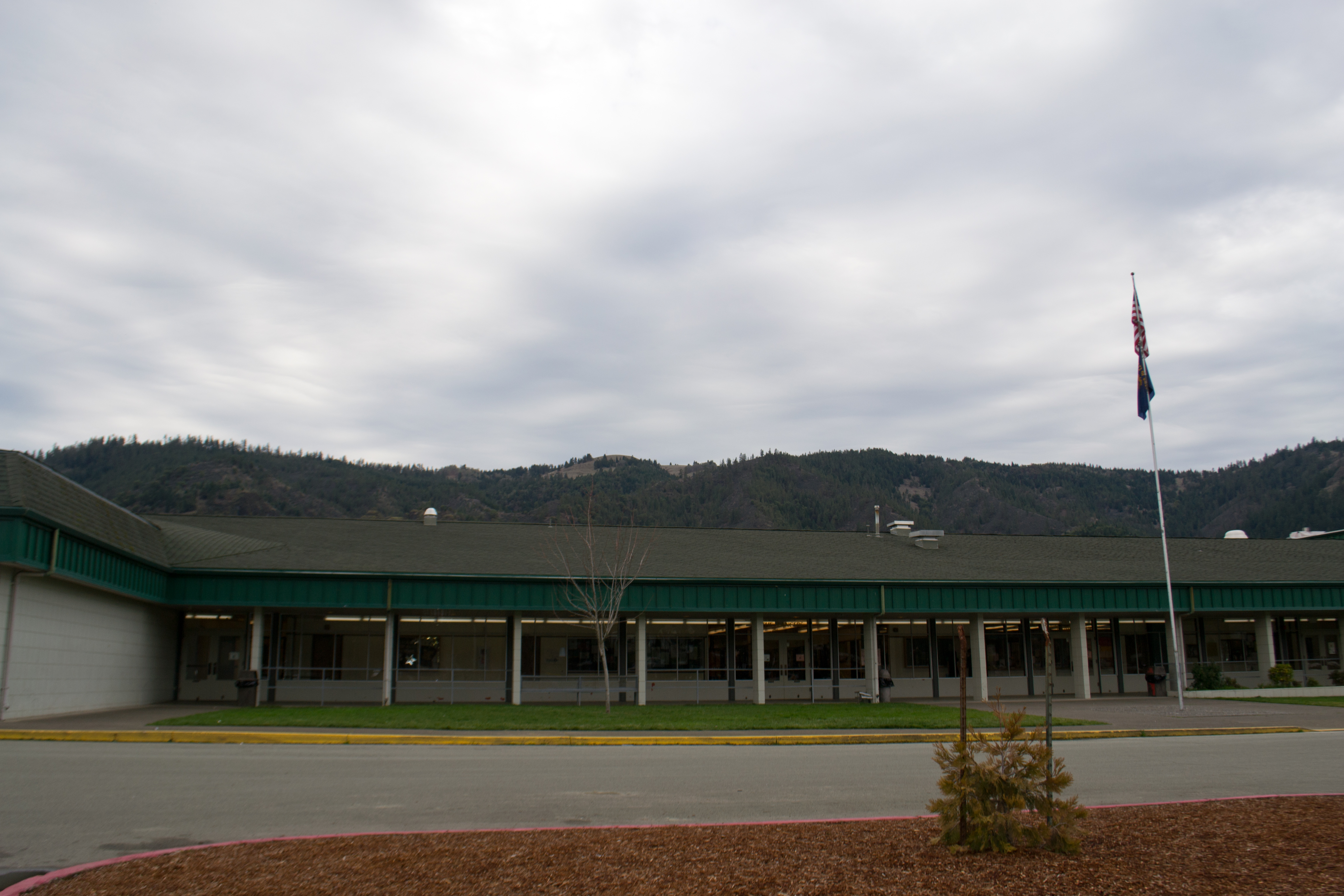

Location
- 501 NW Chadwick Lane; Myrtle Creek, Douglas County, Oregon 97457; United States; 42.986654°N 123.327751°W

Information
- Type: Public
- Opened: 196
- School district: South Umpqua School District
- Principal: Carl Simpson
- Teaching staff: 19.52 (FTE)
- Grades: 9-12
- Enrollment: 380 (2017–18)
- Student to teacher ratio: 19.47
- Colors: Black and gold
- Athletics conference: OSAA Far West League 4A-3
- Mascot: Lancers
- Website: https://www.susd.k12.or.us/suhs/

South Umpqua High School is a public high school in Myrtle Creek, Oregon, United States.

== Academics ==
In 2008, 68% of the school's seniors received their high school diploma. Of 129 students, 88 graduated, 31 withdrew, 6 received a modified diploma, and 4 continued to attend high school.
