= Crow Middle/High School =

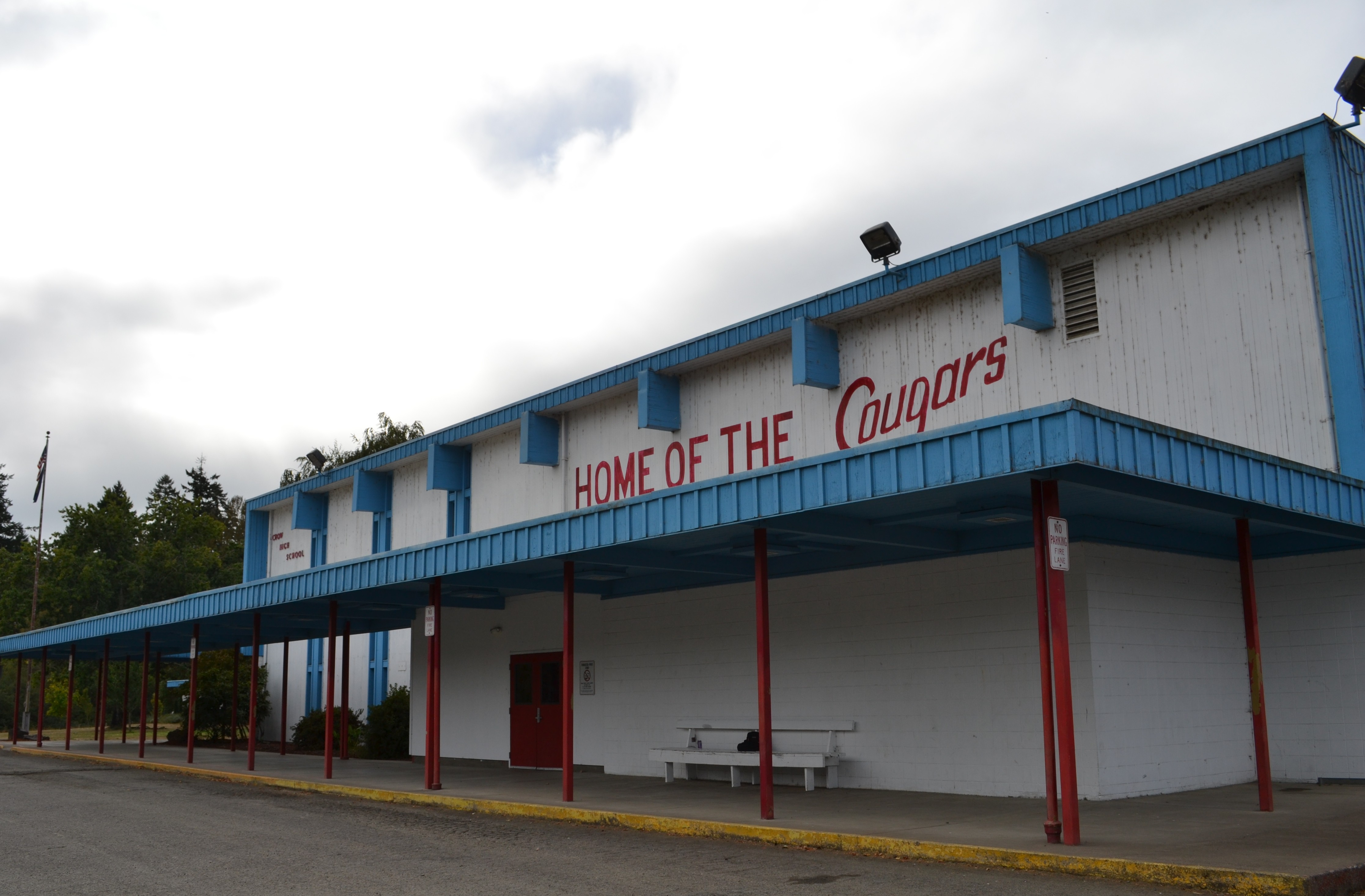

Location
- 25863 Crow Road; Eugene, (Lane County), Oregon 97402; United States; 43.980463°N 123.279648°W

Information
- Type: Public
- School district: Crow-Applegate-Lorane School District
- Principal: Heidi Brown (interim)
- Grades: 7-12
- Enrollment: 74 (2023-2024)
- Colors: Blue and scarlet
- Athletics conference: OSAA Mountain West League 1A-3
- Mascot: Cougar
- Website: https://www.cal.k12.or.us/page/cmhs-home

Crow Middle/High School is a public middle/high school in Crow, Oregon, near Eugene, Oregon, United States.

== Academics ==
In 2008, 85% of the school's seniors received a high school diploma. Of 26 students, 22 graduated, two dropped out, and two were still in high school the following year.
