= Rogue Valley Adventist School =

Rogue Valley Adventist Academy

Location
- 3675 S Stage Road; Medford, Jackson County, Oregon 97501; United States; 42.301992°N 122.92808°W

Information
- Type: Private
- Opened: 1908
- Principal: Anne Campbell
- Grades: Pre K-12
- Enrollment: 122
- Colors: Maroon and White
- Athletics conference: OSAA Mountain Valley League 1A-5
- Team name: Red Tail Hawks (Hawks)
- Affiliation: Adventist
- Website: www.rvaa.us

Rogue Valley Adventist Academy is a private Adventist kindergarten through 12th grade school in Medford, Oregon, United States. Rogue Valley Adventist Academy opened in 1908 as a one-room school house. Since then it has undergone a number of renovations as well as name changes. Rogue Valley enrolls about 132 students. The Rogue Valley Red Tail Hawks compete in the OSAA Mountain Valley League 1A-5. The school's colors are maroon and white.

== Curriculum ==
The schools curriculum consists primarily of the standard courses taught at college preparatory schools across the world. All students are required to take classes in the core areas of English, Basic Sciences, Mathematics, a Foreign Language, and Social Sciences.

== Spiritual aspects ==
All students take religion classes each year that they are enrolled. These classes cover topics in biblical history and Christian and denominational doctrines. Instructors in other disciplines also begin each class period with prayer or a short devotional thought, many which encourage student input. Weekly, the entire student body gathers together in the auditorium for an hour-long chapel service. Outside the classrooms there is year-round spiritually oriented programming that relies on student involvement.

== See also ==
- List of Seventh-day Adventist secondary schools
- Seventh-day Adventist education
