= Illinois Valley High School =

Location
- 625 E River Street; Cave Junction, (Josephine County), Oregon 97523; United States; 42°10′02″N 123°37′55″W

Information
- Type: Public
- School district: Three Rivers/Josephine County School District
- Principal: Erik Lathen
- Teaching staff: 16.00 (on an FTE basis)
- Grades: 9-12
- Enrollment: 320 (2022-2023)
- Student to teacher ratio: 20.00
- Colors: Red and white
- Athletics conference: OSAA 2A
- Mascot: Cougar

Illinois Valley High School is a public high school in Cave Junction, Oregon, United States.

== Academics ==
In 2008, 72% of the school's seniors received a high school diploma. Of 118 students, 85 graduated, 25 dropped out, one received a modified diploma, and seven were still in high school the following year.

In October 2006 the school was placed on the No Child Left Behind safety watch list. In October 2009 the school was removed from the No Child Left Behind safety watch list, due to the following not occurring: "more than 1 percent of their students brought a weapon to school, were expelled for violence, or committed a violent crime on campus."

== Athletics ==
Illinois Valley's high school athletic program began around the time the school did. The mascot is the Cougar and the team colors are red and white. The school's logo is taken from a University of Houston athletic image.

The school is a member in good standing of the Oregon School Activities Association, and participates in the Valley Coast Conference. Teams currently play in Class 2A, based on school enrollment.
