= Yoncalla High School =

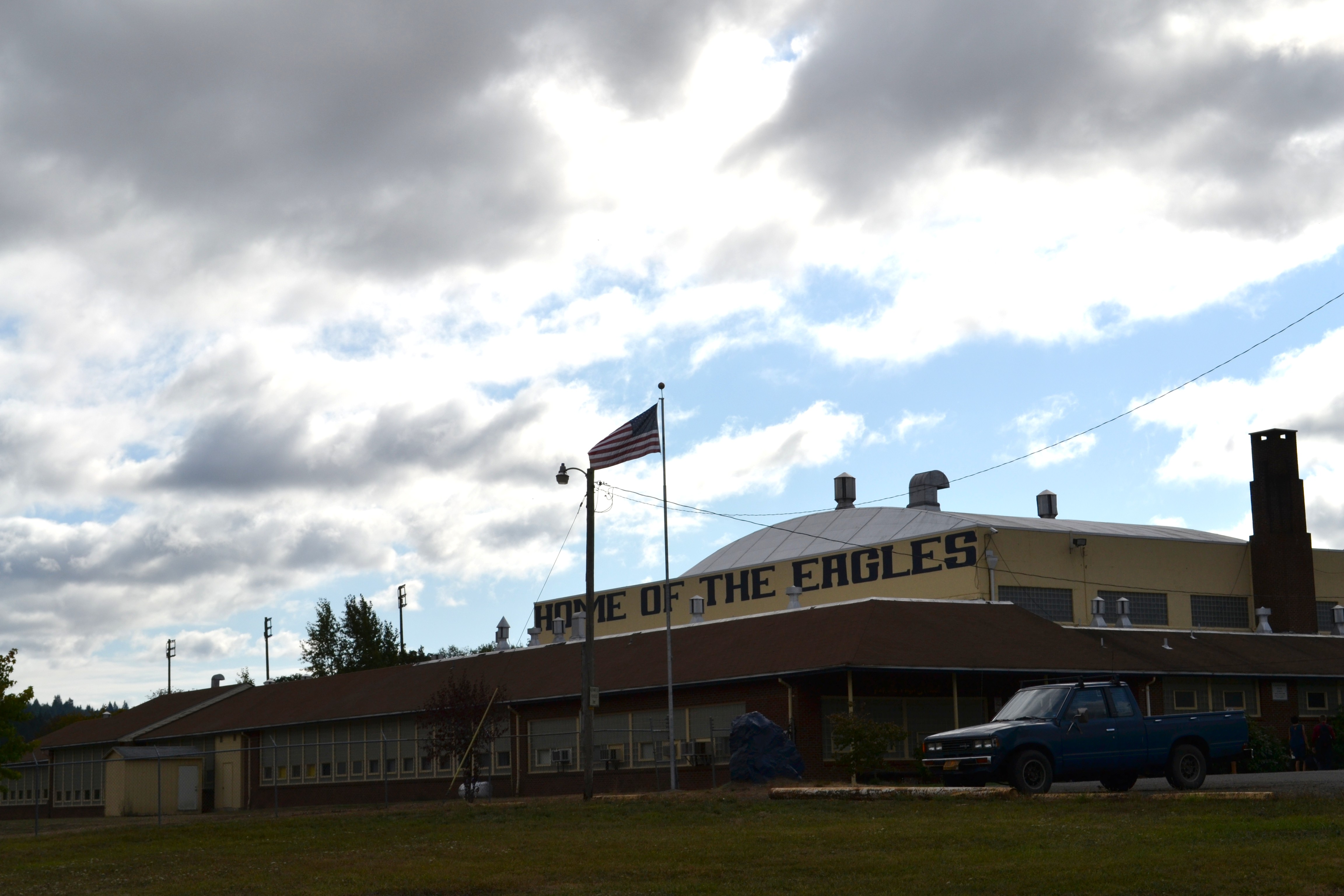

Location
- 292 Fifth Street; Yoncalla, (Douglas County), Oregon 97499; United States
- Coordinates: 43°35′43″N 123°17′02″W

Information
- School type: Public, high school
- School district: Yoncalla School District
- Principal: Berlin Beary
- Staff: 5.00 (FTE)
- Grades: 6–12
- Enrollment: 90 (2023–2024)
- Student to teacher ratio: 18.00
- Colors: Blue and gold
- Athletics conference: OSAA Mountain View Conference 2A-2
- Mascot: Eagle
- Website: www.yoncalla.k12.or.us/domain/9

Yoncalla High School is a public high school in Yoncalla, Oregon, United States.

== Academics ==
In 2008, 79% of the school's seniors received a high school diploma. Of 33 students, 26 graduated, four dropped out, one received a modified diploma, and two were still in high school the following year.
