= Dayville School =

Location
- 285 School House Road; Dayville, (Grant County), Oregon 97825; United States; 44.467335°N 119.537929°W

Information
- Type: Public
- School district: Dayville School District
- Principal: Tiffnie Schmadeka
- Grades: K-12
- Enrollment: 56
- Colors: Orange and black
- Athletics conference: OSAA High Desert League 1A-8
- Mascot: Tiger

Dayville School is a public school in Dayville, Oregon, United States. It is the only school in the Dayville School District.

== Academics ==
In 2008, 100% of the school's seniors received a high school diploma. Of seven students, seven graduated and none dropped out.

There are 18 people on staff at the school: the principal, six teachers, three aides, five support staff, a bus driver and a cook.
