= Imbler High School =

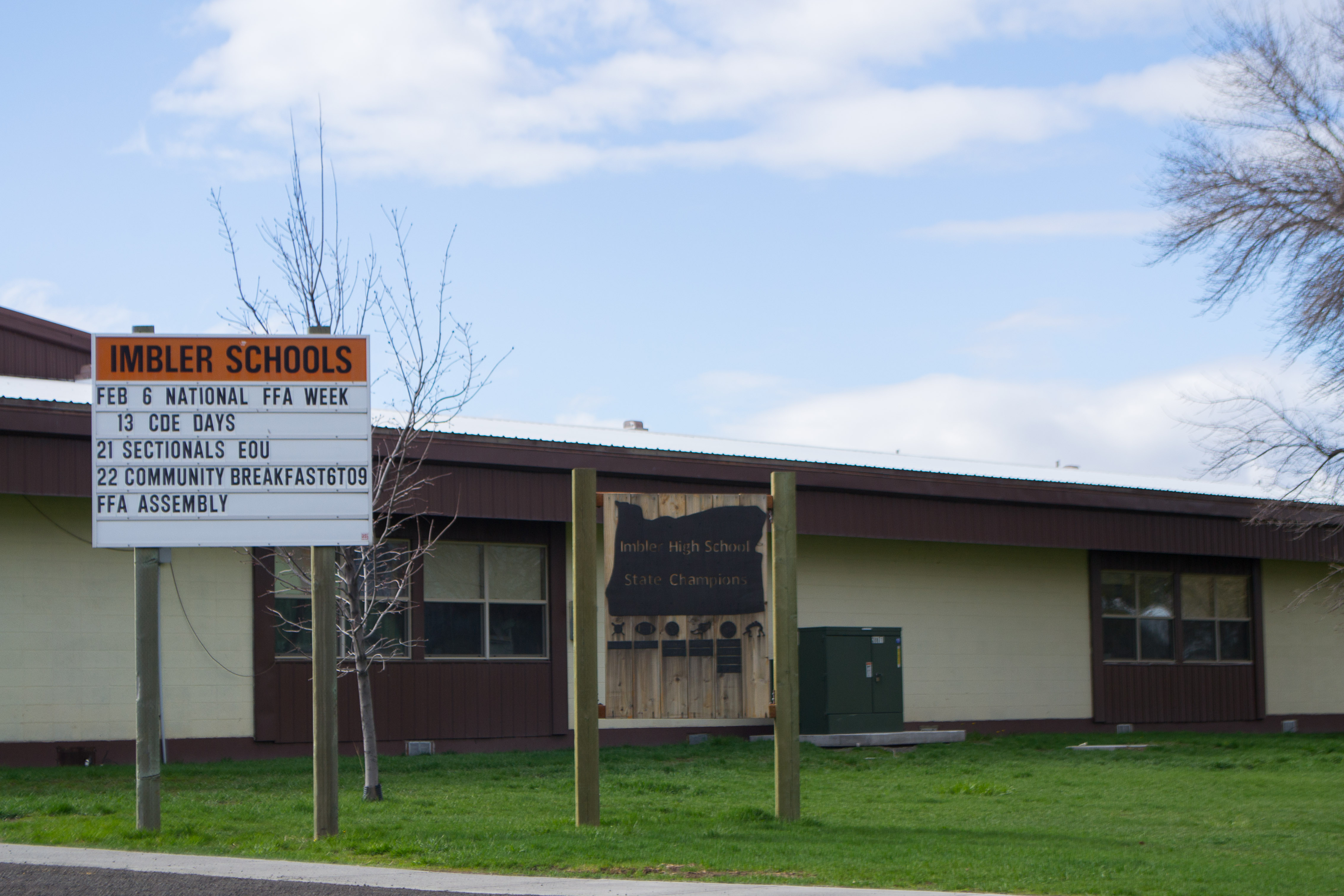

Location
- 6th and Esther Avenue; Imbler, (Union County), Oregon 97841; United States
- Coordinates: 45.462198°N 117.965205°W

Information
- Type: Public
- School district: Imbler School District
- Principal: Michael Mills
- Grades: K-12
- Enrollment: 313 (2016-17)
- Colors: Black and orange
- Athletics conference: OSAA Wapiti League 2A-6
- Mascot: Panther
- Rival: Elgin Huskies
- Website: Imbler HS website

Imbler High School is a public high school in Imbler, Oregon, United States.

== Academics ==
In 2008, 97% of the school's seniors received a high school diploma. Of 38 students, 37 graduated and one dropped out.
