= Klickitat Elementary and High School =

School in Washington state

Location
- 98 School Drive, Klickitat Washington
- Coordinates: 45°49′00″N 121°09′12″W

Information
- Website: Klickitat School District #402

Klickitat Elementary and High School is a public school in Klickitat, Washington, serving 111 students in grades kindergarten through 12. Unlike most school districts, where elementary, middle school/junior high, and high school levels are distinct, Klickitat Elementary and High School combines them. The student body is 88% White, 5% American Indian, 4% Hispanic, 3% Black, and 1% two or more races.
