= Elkton High School (Oregon) =

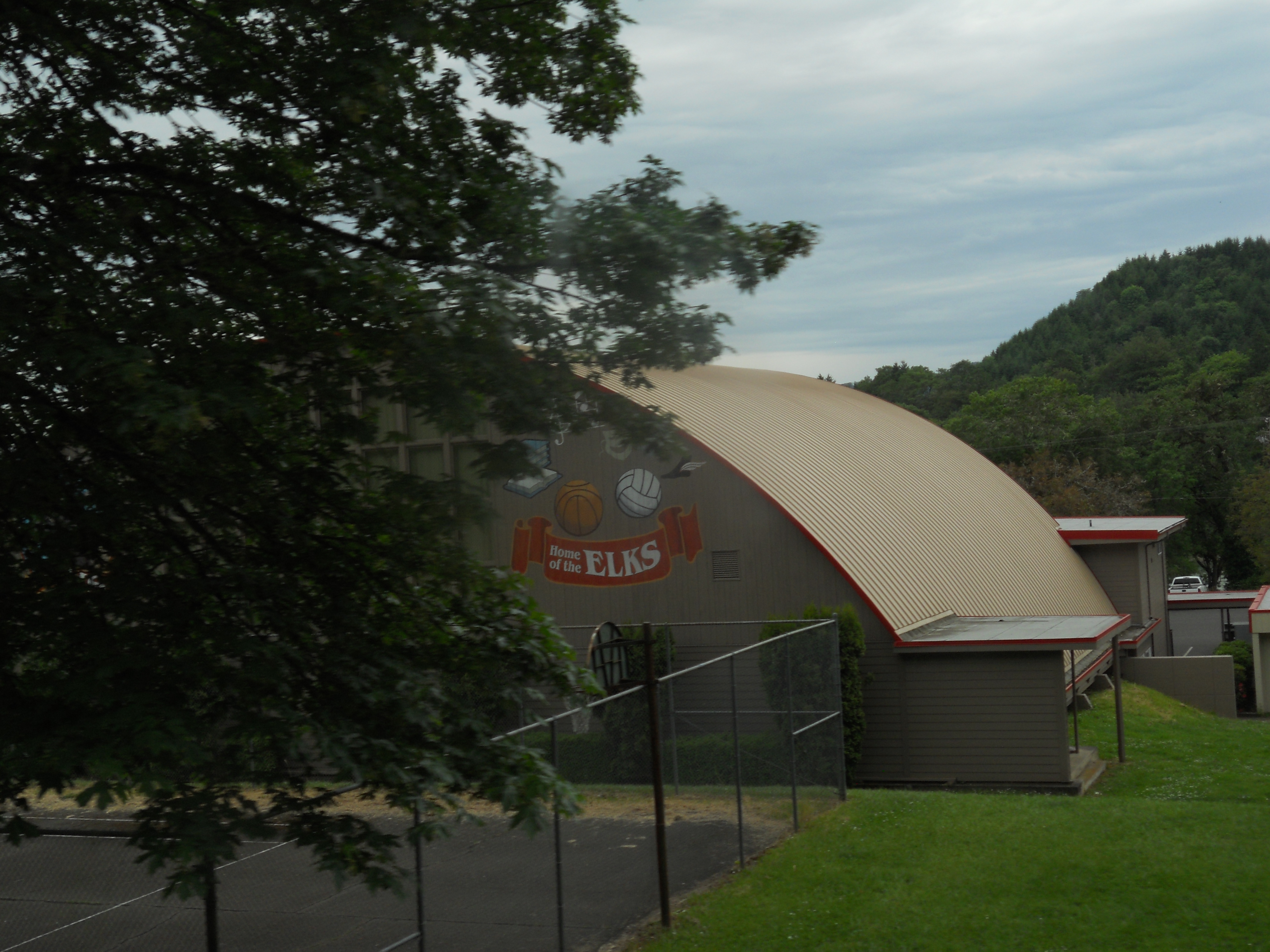

Location
- 739 River Road; Elkton, (Douglas County), Oregon 97436; United States; 43.638187°N 123.570759°W

Information
- Type: Public
- School district: Elkton School District
- Principal: Andy Boe
- Teaching staff: 16.87 (FTE)
- Grades: K-12
- Enrollment: 235 (2024–2025)
- Student to teacher ratio: 13.93
- Colors: Scarlet, white and black
- Athletics conference: OSAA Skyline League 1A-4
- Mascot: Elks
- Newspaper: The Bugle
- Website: Elkton HS website

Elkton High School (EHS) is a public high school in Elkton, Oregon, United States. It is part of the Elkton School District and is the only high school in Elkton.

== Academics ==
In 2008, 59% of the school's seniors received a high school diploma. Of 22 students, 13 graduated, six dropped out, one received a modified diploma, and two were still in high school in 2009.`
