= Prairie City School =

Public school in Prairie City, Oregon, United States

Location
- 740 Overholt Street; Prairie City, (Grant County), Oregon 97869; United States; 44.456136°N 118.70896°W

Information
- Type: Public
- School district: Prairie City School District
- Principal: David Kerr
- Teaching staff: 21.50 (FTE)
- Grades: K-12
- Enrollment: 245 (2023-2024)
- Student to teacher ratio: 11.40
- Colors: Black and orange
- Athletics conference: OSAA High Desert League 1A-8
- Mascot: Panther
- Team name: Prairie City Panthers
- Website: Prairie City School

Prairie City School is a public school in Prairie City, Oregon, United States that serves students from kindergarten through twelfth grade. It is the only school in the Prairie City School District.

== Academics ==
In 2008, 73% of the school's seniors received a high school diploma. Of 11 students, eight graduated, none dropped out, one received a modified diploma, and two were still in high school the following year.
