= Arlington High School (Oregon) =

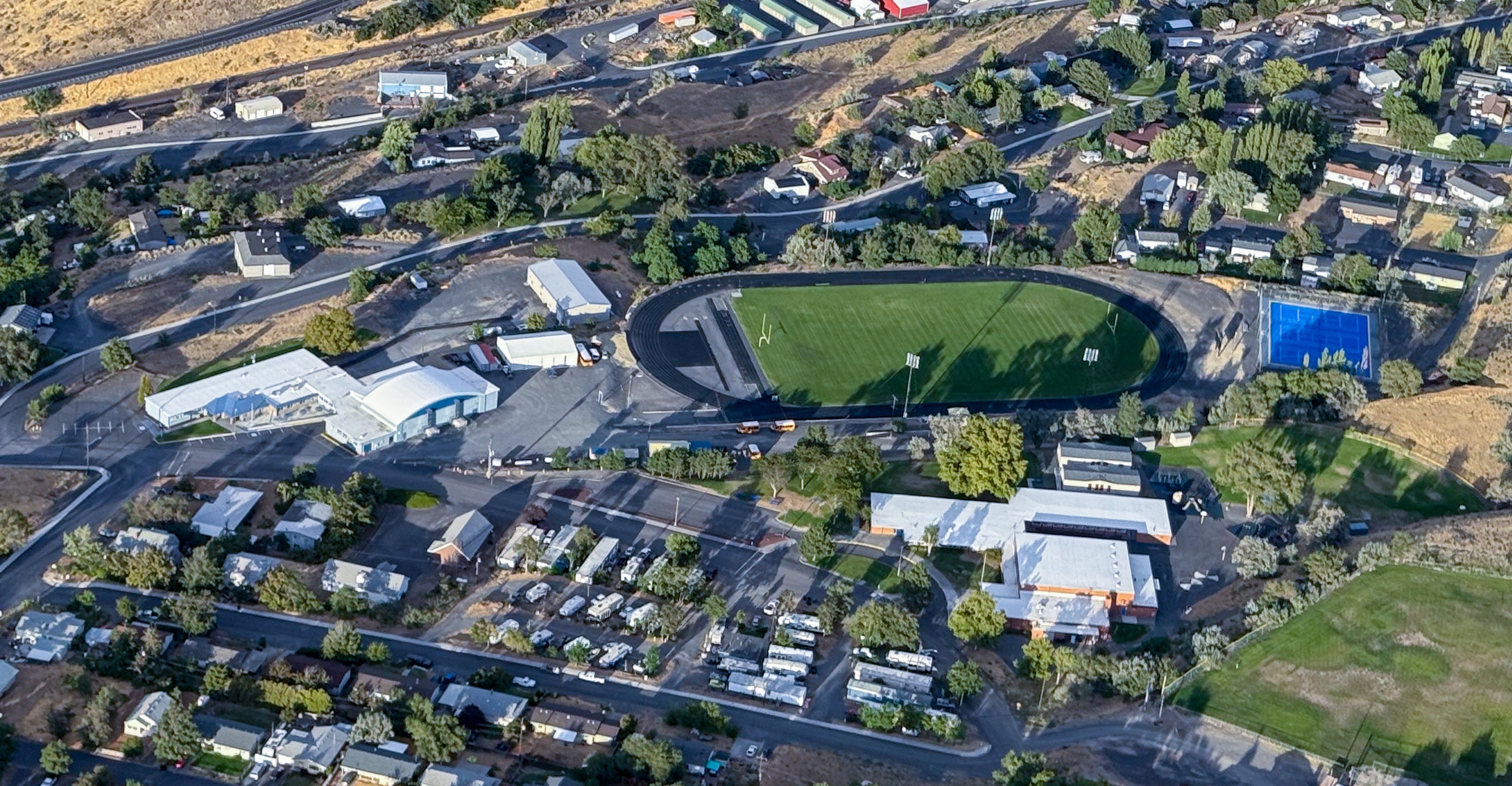
- Aerial photo of high school

Location
- 1200 Main Street; Arlington, Oregon 97812; United States
- Coordinates: 45.71236°N 120.19993°W

Information
- Type: Public charter high school
- School district: Arlington School District #3
- NCES School ID: 410147000343
- Teaching staff: 12.00 (on an FTE basis)
- Grades: KG–12
- Enrollment: 136 (2023-2024)
- Student to teacher ratio: 11.33
- Colors: Royal Blue and Gold
- Athletics conference: OSAA Big Sky League 1A-6
- Mascot: Honker
- Website: www.honkernet.net

Arlington High School is a public charter high school in Arlington, Oregon. It is part of the Arlington School District #3.

== Academics ==
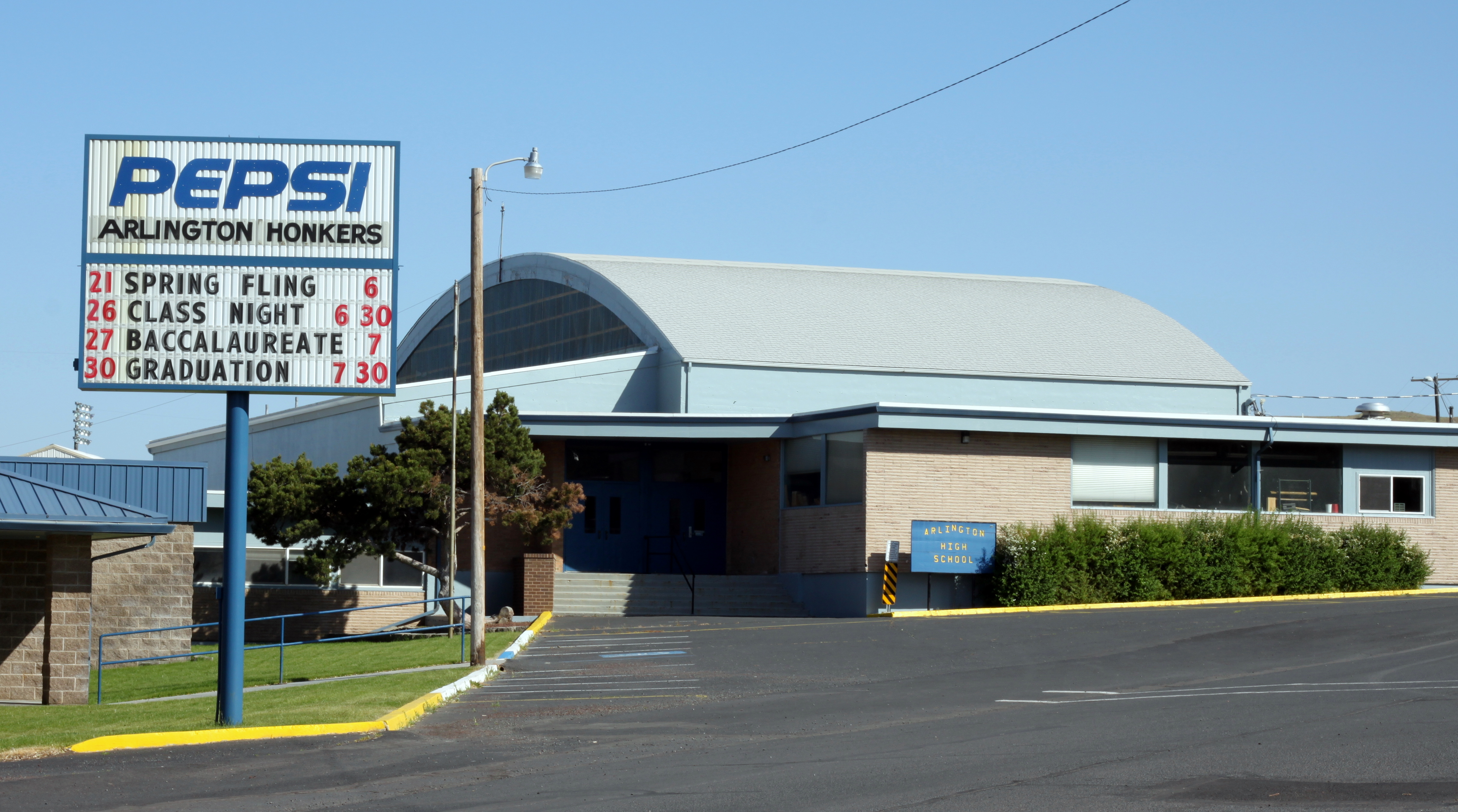
Arlington High School

In 2008, 100% of the school's seniors received a high school diploma. Of four students, four graduated and none dropped out.

== Notable alumni ==
- Doc Severinsen, musician
