= Monument School =

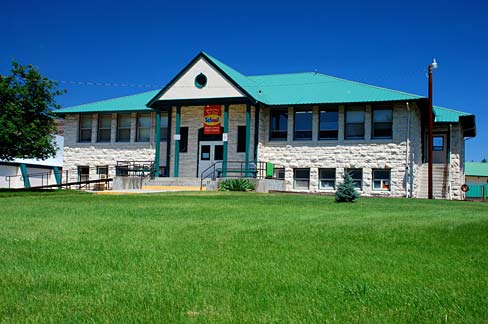

Location
- 127 North Street; Monument, Grant County, Oregon 97864; United States
- Coordinates: 44.820555°N 119.419981°W

Information
- Type: Public
- School district: Monument School District
- Principal: Laura Thomas
- Grades: K-12
- Enrollment: 66
- Colors: Green, orange, black, and white
- Athletics conference: OSAA High Desert League 1A-8
- Mascot: Tiger

Monument School is a public school in Monument, Oregon, United States. It is the only school in the Monument School District.

== Academics ==
In 2008, 100% of the school's seniors received a high school diploma. Of five students, five graduated and none dropped out.
