= Umatilla High School (Oregon) =

Public school in Umatilla, Oregon, United States

Location
- 1400 7th Street; Umatilla, (Umatilla County), Oregon 97882; United States; 45.916409°N 119.336554°W

Information
- Type: Public
- School district: Umatilla School District
- Principal: Bob Lorence
- Teaching staff: 24.95 (FTE)
- Grades: 9-12
- Enrollment: 435 (2022–2023)
- Student to teacher ratio: 17.43
- Colors: Blue and orange
- Athletics conference: OSAA Eastern Oregon League 3A-5
- Mascot: Viking
- Yearbook: The Viking
- Website: uhs.umatilla.k12.or.us

Umatilla High School is a public high school in Umatilla, Oregon, United States.

In 2008, 83% of the school's seniors received a high school diploma. Of 94 students, 78 graduated, 10 dropped out, two received a modified diploma, and four were still in high school the following year.

Umatilla High School educates about 400 students each year and is one of the few Title IA high schools in Oregon due to its 86% student poverty level. 100% of students receive free lunch and breakfast through a state-funded program. 66% of students are Hispanic, 31% are White, and the remaining 3% fall under an "other" category. The high school had a 67% graduation rate in 2015, a slight improvement from previous years. The average freshmen class size is 100 students. According to the Umatilla High School Annual Report Card, only 43% of graduating students continue education beyond high school. Most of the students who do, attend community college.

The school has made dramatic improvements in recent years. From new STEM programming to the offering of free college courses to its students, UHS is on the rise. Recent UHS alumni have been very successful. A student from the class of 2000 was the first UHS graduate to attend an Ivy league institution, completing a master's degree from Columbia University in 2013.
