= KCMD =

Radio Station based in Grants Pass, Oregon

KBXG
- Grants Pass, Oregon; United States
- Broadcast area: Grants Pass, Oregon
- Frequency: 99.3 MHz
- Branding: 99.3 The Jukebox

Programming
- Format: Oldies
- Affiliations: Townhall News

Ownership
- Owner: Bicoastal Media Licenses VI, LLC
- Sister stations: KMED, KRWQ, KLDZ, KIFS

History
- First air date: 2012 (as KCMD)
- Former call signs: KCMD (2012-2024)
- Call sign meaning: JukeBoX Grants Pass

Technical information
- Licensing authority: FCC
- Facility ID: 185438
- Class: A
- ERP: 250 watts
- HAAT: 468 meters

Links
- Public license information: Public file; LMS
- Webcast: Listen live
- Website: 993thejukebox.com

KBXG (99.3 FM) is a radio station based in Grants Pass, Oregon, United States. It is owned by Bicoastal Media Licenses VI, LLC. KBXG currently airs an oldies format. KCMD was acquired from Three Rivers Broadcasting, LLC on March 31, 2017 for US$325,000.

On June 1, 2024, KCMD dropped its simulcast with talk-formatted KMED and changed its format to oldies, branded as "99.3 The Jukebox" under new KBXG call letters.
