= KYVL =

KYVL may refer to:

- KYVL (AM), a radio station (1440 AM) licensed to serve Medford, Oregon, United States
- KMED (FM), a radio station (106.3 FM) licensed to serve Eagle Point, Oregon, which held the call sign KYVL from 2015 to 2023
