= KMED =

KMED may refer to:

- KMED (FM), a radio station (106.3 FM) licensed to serve Eagle Point, Oregon, United States
- KYVL (AM), a radio station (1440 AM) licensed to serve Medford, Oregon, which held the call sign KMED from 1927 to 2023
- KTMT-FM, a radio station (93.7 FM) licensed to serve Medford, Oregon, which held the call sign KMED-FM from 1970 to 1972
- KTVL, a television station (channel 10) licensed to serve Medford, Oregon, which held the call sign KMED-TV from 1961 to 1977
