= KMED (AM) =

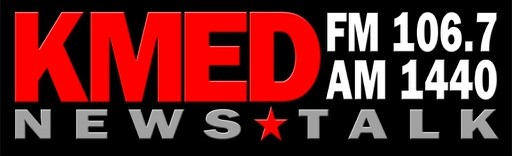
- Medford, Oregon; United States
- Broadcast area: Medford-Ashland
- Frequency: 1440 kHz

Ownership
- Owner: Bicoastal Media; (Bicoastal Media Licenses VI, LLC)
- Sister stations: KCMD, KRWQ, KLDZ, KMED, KIFS

History
- First air date: December 28, 1926
- Last air date: October 2023
- Former call signs: KMED (1926–2023); KYVL (2023–2024)
- Call sign meaning: Medford

Technical information
- Licensing authority: FCC
- Facility ID: 14352
- Class: B
- Power: 5,000 watts day; 1,000 watts night
- Transmitter coordinates: 42°18′36″N 122°48′41″W

Links
- Public license information: Public file; LMS

KMED (1440 AM) was a radio station licensed to Medford, Oregon, United States, and serving the Medford-Ashland area. The station was owned by Bicoastal Media. It was established in 1926, and operated until 2023, when its news/talk programming and the KMED call sign moved to 106.3 FM. The license remained active until 2024 as KYVL.

== History ==
According to Federal Communications Commission (FCC) records, KMED's first license was granted on December 29, 1926. However, the station's founder, William J. Virgin, had been involved in radio dating back to at least the fall of 1921, when he and three others constructed a five-watt transmitter in Elmer Morrison's garage in Ashland. It is not clear if this transmitter was licensed at this time, or if the endeavor ever expanded beyond experimental transmissions.

Beginning in May 1922, a series of announcements appeared stating that Virgin was planning to establish a broadcasting station at the family mill in Central Point. This station received its first license in August 1922, licensed to the E. J. Virgin Milling Co. in Central Point, for operation on the 360 meter (833 kHz) "entertainment" wavelength. It was assigned the call letters KFAY, and apparently never made any broadcasts from Central Point, as a short time later station ownership was changed to Virgin's Radio Service, and it was announced that construction had started to locate the station at the Jackson County fairgrounds in Medford. KFAY's debut broadcast was made from the fairgrounds on September 23.

During its two-year life, KFAY faced significant financial pressures, especially since at this time it did not carry advertising. In 1924, the American Telephone & Telegraph Company (AT&T), which held a number of important radio patents, announced that existing stations would have to pay for the right to use its patents. Virgin reported that AT&T wanted a $500 licensing fee if KFAY was to continue operating. Around this time, KFAY ended its broadcasts, and its license was formally deleted in December 1924.

Two years later, W. J. Virgin established KMED. There have been conflicting interpretations whether KMED should be considered a continuation of KFAY or a separate station. FCC records, inherited from the Department of Commerce, regulators of radio at the time, considered the two to be distinct stations. Moreover, a newspaper review of KMED that appeared on December 31, 1929, describes KFAY as W. J. Virgin's "first station", and the "History of KMED" section in a May 20, 1931 station advertisement also refers to KFAY and KMED as separate operations. In contrast, the "History of KMED" section in a 1949 station advertisement does trace the current station's origin to KFAY's establishment in 1922, and in 1957, KMED celebrated its 35th anniversary, again placing its start with KFAY in 1922.

Later, a 1994 detailed review of the history of Oregon radio by Ronald Kramer concluded that KFAY and KMED should be considered two different stations, and in 2012, KMED Program Director Bill Meyer was quoted as saying that since the late 1990s, the radio station had stopped claiming that it was the oldest in Oregon.

=== KMED ===
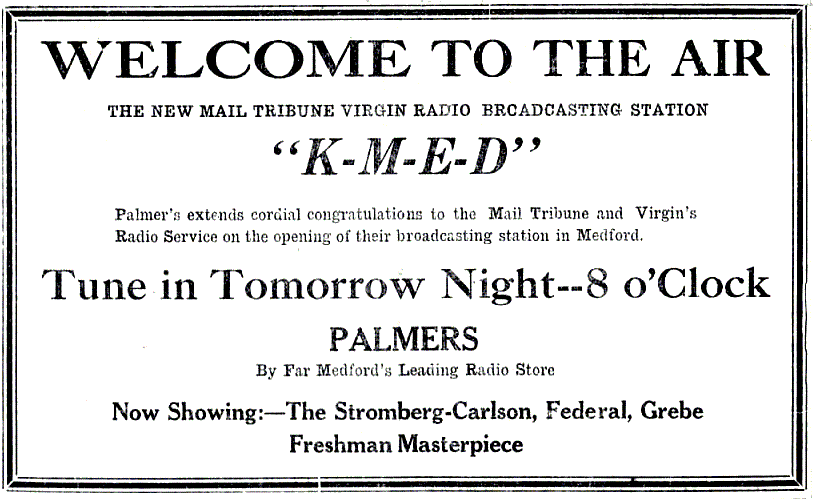
KMED made its debut broadcast on December 28, 1926.

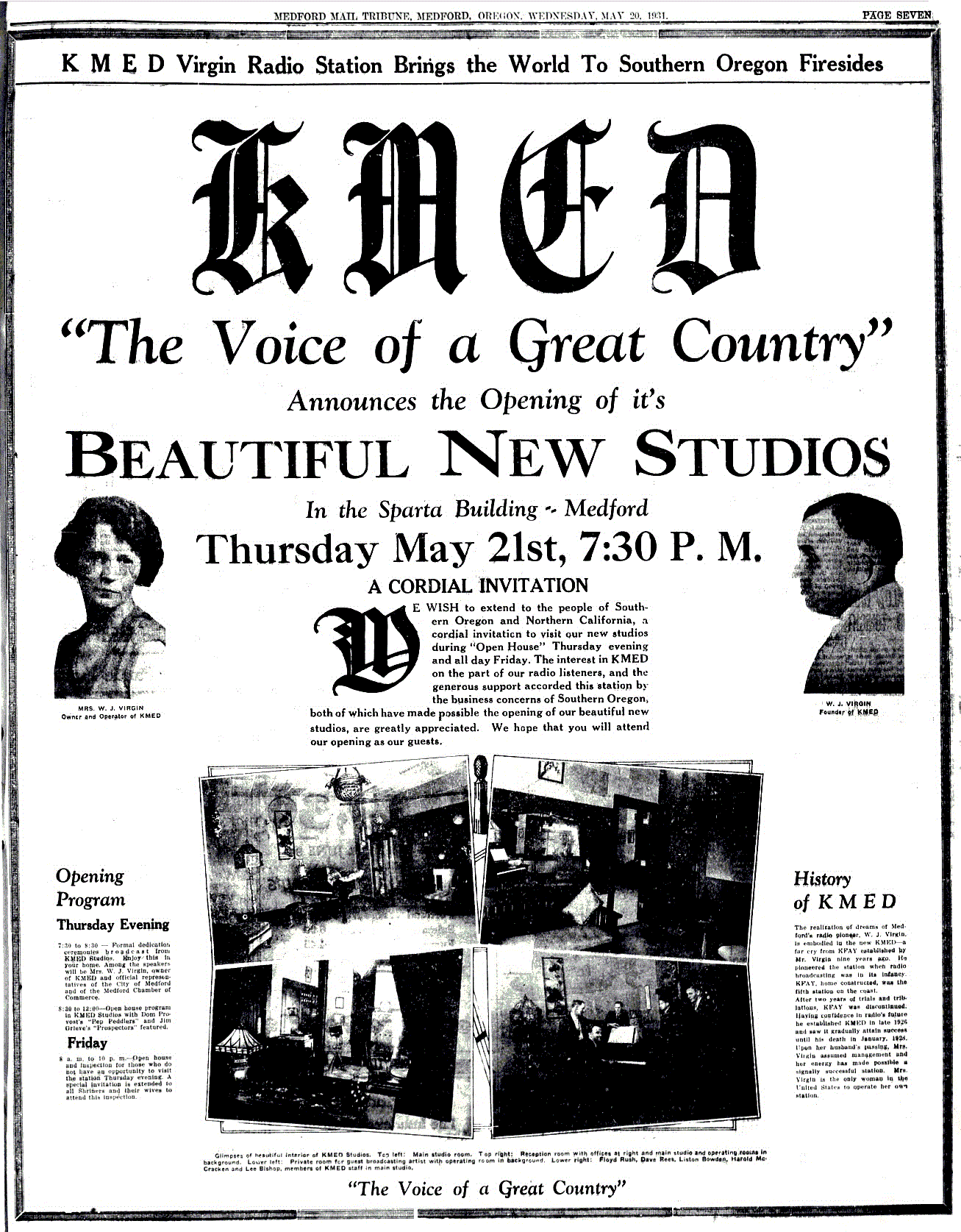
KMED moved into new studios in May 1931.

By 1926, it was becoming acceptable for radio stations to sell airtime, thus they could be self-financing. A full-page advertisement in the October 6, 1926 Medford Mail Tribune proclaimed that "NOW! A Radio Broadcasting Station for Medford. A New Western Electric Station of the Latest Type Will Be Established Here in the Near Future by Virgins Radio Service and the Medford Mail Tribune", and that this new station would be "'on the air' soon". In early December, Virgin sold his radio shop to H. C. Witham, in order to "devote his entire time to the new Virgin-Mail-Tribune broadcasting station which will start operation this month".

KMED was first licensed in December 1926 to W. J. Virgin, transmitting on 1200 kHz, and located at the Sparta Building. The station was closely affiliated with the local newspaper, which commonly referred to KMED as the "Mail Tribune-Virgin station". KMED made its debut broadcast on the evening of the 28th, featuring members of the local Craters Club. The next day's broadcast was announced to be 7:45 to 9:00 p.m., beginning with 15 minutes of news and weather provided by the newspaper.

W. J. Virgin died of kidney failure in January 1928, and his wife, Blanche, assumed station ownership, becoming one of the earliest women to own and manage a radio station. In 1950, she sold KMED to Radio Medford. In late 1957, the station's Program Director wrote to the local paper reporting that as of that January the station had "banned from its library of usable records any records that would offend what might be called a reasonable majority of the public" after "realizing the folly of the 'Rock and Roll' era".

In December 2022, the station owners announced that KMED would cease broadcasting on January 8, 2023, and move its news/talk programming to 106.3 KYVL in Eagle Point. On January 11, the stations swapped call signs, with 1440 picking up KYVL.

The 1440 facility, as KYVL, finally fell silent in October 2023, as the station's towers were demolished following the end of the station's lease. After Bicoastal Media surrendered the KYVL license, the FCC cancelled it on September 19, 2024.
