= Pear Blossom Park =

Park in Medford, Oregon, U.S.

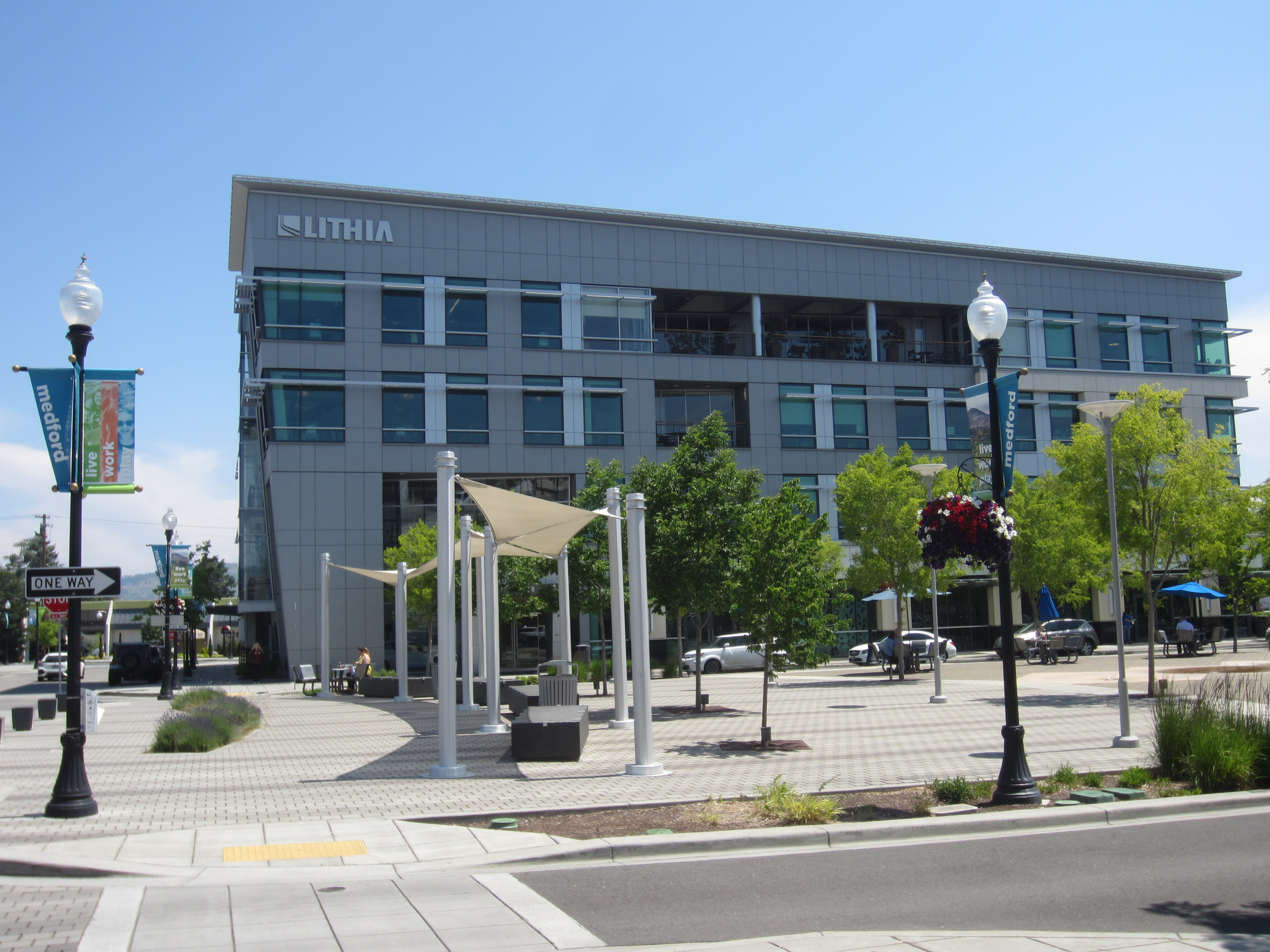
- Part of the park in 2019
- Interactive map of Pear Blossom Park
- Nearest city: Medford, Oregon, United States
- Coordinates: 42°19′44″N 122°52′23″W

Pear Blossom Park is a park in Medford, Oregon, United States. The Commons at Pear Blossom Park was a collaboration project by the Medford Urban Renewal Agency (MURA) and Lithia Motors.

The park has hosted the Art in Bloom Festival, Easter egg hunts, the Pear Blossom Festival and Parade's Street Fair, as well as demonstrations and protests, such as the clean air rally in 2019. The city's Christmas tree has been placed in the park.
