= KROG =

- Grants Pass, Oregon; United States
- Broadcast area: Medford-Ashland, Oregon
- Frequency: 96.9 MHz
- Branding: Rock 96.9 The Rogue

Programming
- Format: Active rock
- Affiliations: Compass Media Networks

Ownership
- Owner: Opus Broadcasting Systems
- Sister stations: KCNA; KRTA; KRVC

History
- First air date: 1981
- Former call signs: KFMJ (1981–1992); KYJC-FM (1992–1996)
- Call sign meaning: Rogue, as in the Rogue Valley

Technical information
- Licensing authority: FCC
- Facility ID: 19553
- Class: C
- ERP: 25,000 watts
- HAAT: 679 meters (2,228 ft)
- Transmitter coordinates: 42°22′56″N 123°16′29″W
- Translators: 94.3 K232DB (Myrtle Creek); 103.7 K279AJ (Roseburg)
- Repeater: 96.9 KROG-FM1 (Medford)

Links
- Public license information: Public file; LMS
- Webcast: Listen live
- Website: opusradio.com/96-9fm/

KROG (96.9 FM) is a radio station broadcasting an active rock music format. Licensed to Grants Pass, Oregon, United States, the station serves the Medford-Ashland area. The station is owned by Opus Broadcasting Systems.

The station is located in the OPUS Building in Northwest Medford near the intersection of Sage Road and Highway 238.

== History ==
Starting in 1981, KFMJ had an adult rock format. Branded as "KFMJ 97" the station played a mix of popular rock and pop music.

In 1992, KFMJ became KYJC-FM as "K97" with a hot country music format, competing with KRWQ.

In 1996, after 105.1 "K-Rogue" dropped Hot AC for Country, 96.9 returned to pop music as KROG "97 FM The Rogue" with a hot adult contemporary format. KROG became more modern adult contemporary toward the end of the 1990s.

In the early 2000s, KROG rebranded as “Star 97” with hot adult contemporary. Not long after that, the station became “97 The Rogue” with an alternative format, which lead to a more rock-based sound as "New Rock 96-9 The Rogue" later in the decade.

With KZZE flipping from active rock to adult album alternative KYVL in 2015, KROG transitioned to active rock “Rock 96-9 The Rogue” by 2016.

== Translators ==
KROG broadcasts on the following translators and booster:

Broadcast translators for KROG
Call sign	Frequency	City of license	FID	ERP (W)	Class	FCC info
K232DB	94.3 FM	Myrtle Creek, Oregon	79262	10	D	LMS
KROG-FM1	96.9 FM	Medford, Oregon	160191	2,000	D	LMS
K279AJ	103.7 FM	Roseburg, Oregon	13709	75	D	LMS
