= Rogue Valley Transportation District =

- Founded: 1975
- Headquarters: 3200 Crater Lake Avenue; Medford, Oregon, U.S.
- Locale: Jackson County, Oregon
- Service area: Rogue Valley
- Service type: Transit bus
- Routes: 6
- Stations: 3
- Fleet: 45 (2022)
- Annual ridership: 758,746 (FY2023)
- Fuel type: Compressed natural gas and diesel
- General manager: Julie Brown
- Website: rvtd.org

Rogue Valley Transportation District is a public transit system serving Jackson County, Oregon. The district serves the cities of Medford, Ashland, White City, Phoenix, Talent, Jacksonville, and Central Point. The district also provides paratransit services to senior citizens and people with disabilities within its route coverage area.

The Rogue Valley Transportation District (RVTD) was established May 6, 1975 upon the passing of a special election measure allowing the county to establish a transportation district funded by Oregon tax dollars. Two years later after considerable planning and procurement of funding, the first transit buses took the streets of Medford, with service beginning in July 1977.

== History ==
The need for creating RVTD arose when its predecessor, a private company named Mount Ashland Stage Lines, went bankrupt and ceased operating in 1974 after having served the Rogue Valley since 1965. Area voters approved the creation of a new public transit district in 1975, but funding for operations was not included, and subsequent requests for authorization of a property-tax increase to fund the service were rejected at the ballot box. The district's board scaled back the original plans by about 35 percent before finally gaining voter approval of operations funding. The service that was inaugurated in July 1977, initially operating under the name, Rogue Rapids Transit, comprised just three buses serving six routes. Initial ridership on the fledgling system was better than expected, prompting the city of Medford to agree to purchase three vans for RVTD's use, which were used for a new shuttle service in the downtown area starting in November 1977.

In June 2025, the agency laid off 82 employees and announced plans to cut 60 percent of its existing service due to the loss of $7 million in federal funding. The second Trump administration had required recipients of the funds to cooperate with increased immigration enforcement, which the Oregon state government opposed. RVTD had applied for the funding as reimbursements for previous costs but had not received them in December 2024 as planned. The service cuts are scheduled to take effect on September 2 and include the elimination of all Saturday service and reduced coverage on routes.

== Service ==
As of 2026, RVTD operates 6 bus routes through the cities of Medford, Ashland, Central Point, Phoenix, Talent and White City. All buses run Monday through Friday; RVTD provides no service on weekends or major holidays. All bus routes begin and terminate at the Front Street Transfer Center located at Front Street between 8th and 10th Street in Downtown Medford. The former Greyhound station, located adjacent to the Front Street Transfer Center, was served by daily intercity buses to Portland and Sacramento. The system also connects with Oregon's POINT Intercity Bus Service, which has connections to Brookings and Klamath Falls.

All RVTD buses are equipped with wheelchair ramps or lifts to comply with the Americans with Disabilities Act of 1990; up to two wheelchair users can be secured in the front seating area of the bus. The bus fleet is also equipped with bicycle racks mounted to the front, stop announcement systems, and real-time tracking. Since 2022, all fixed route buses also offer free Wi-Fi to passengers.

=== Paratransit ===
The Rogue Valley Transportation District operates paratransit service known as Valley Lift. It is offered to senior citizens, people with a disability, or passengers unable to utilize fixed route buses for other reasons. Service is limited to areas which are no more than 3/4 of a mile by air from any fixed bus route. People wishing to utilize the service must apply with RVTD after establishing their eligibility for Valley Lift.

== Fares ==
RVTD buses accept cash fares as well as prepaid tokens, day passes, monthly passes, as well as punch cards for 20 rides each. The Umo fare card and mobile app can also be used to pay for trips on the system and provides free transfers between routes. The basic fare is $2, with a reduced rate of $1 for passengers who are 10 to 17 years old, 62 years or older, have disabilities, or have other proof of eligibility. Valley Lift passengers are charged $4 per ride.

== Fleet ==
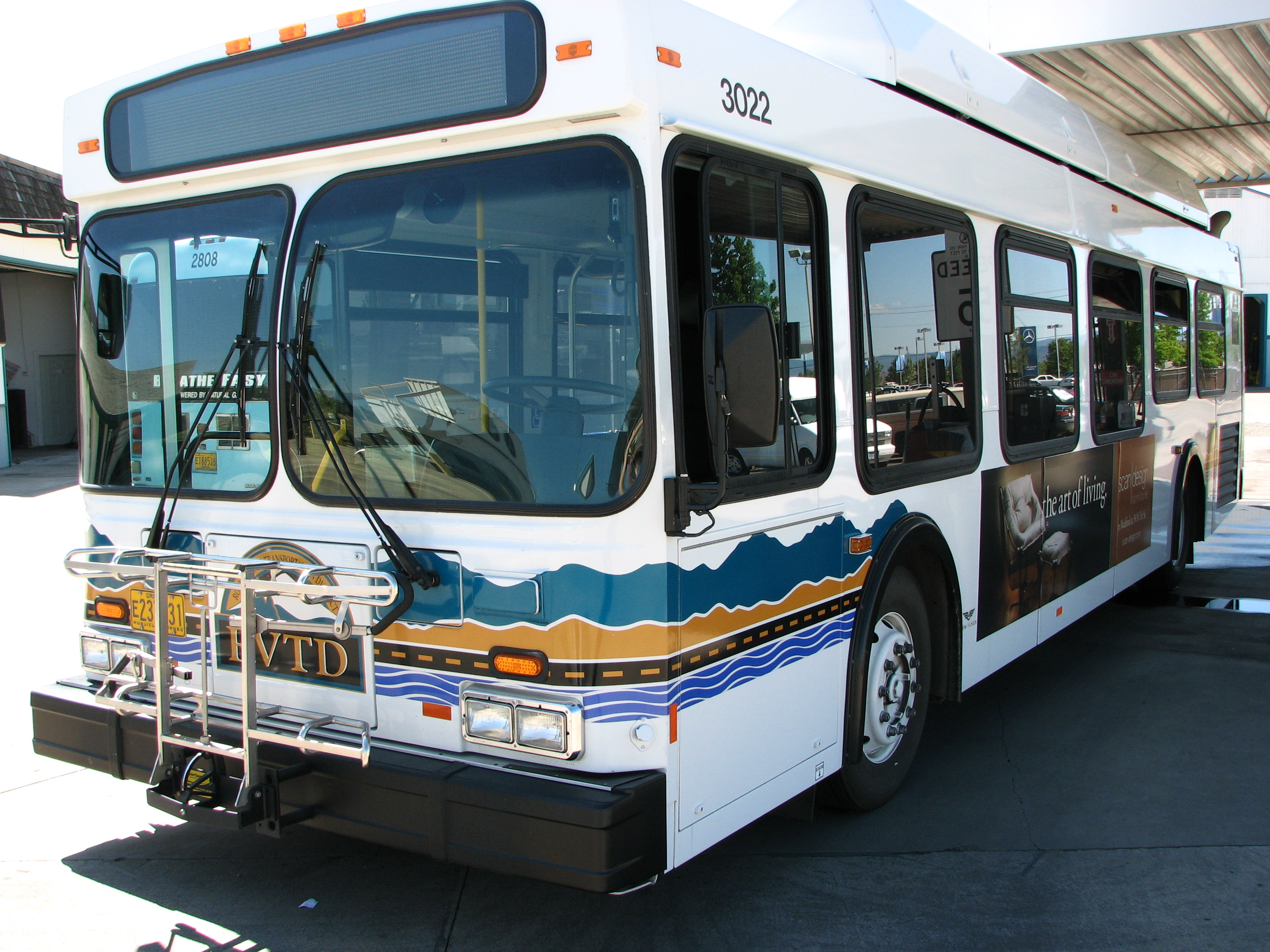
A compressed natural gas bus produced by New Flyer and used by RVTD

As of 2022, RVTD operates a fleet of 45 buses; 73 percent of the buses are powered by compressed natural gas (CNG), while the rest use diesel fuel. RVTD was one of the first transportation districts in the state of Oregon to operate a majority CNG fleet, originally acquiring their first prototype buses, the Blue Bird Q-Bus from Blue Bird Corporation, in 1995.

RVTD later phased out the Blue Bird CNG vehicles in favor of the 35 foot natural gas coach manufactured by Gillig and New Flyer Industries. These newer buses provide for greater fuel capacity of 3600 psi compared to their predecessors 3000 psi limit (allowing greater range on one fill-up), provide space for more passengers (65 seated and standees compared to 50 seated and standees), a low floor design with fully automated wheelchair ramp (compared to the partially automated wheelchair lift), easier passenger boarding and deboarding, as well as a more powerful engine.

In addition to their natural gas buses, the Rogue Valley Transportation District also operates diesel transit coaches in efforts to diversify their fuel usage. This has several key advantages including switching over to primarily diesel usage in the event of a natural gas price hike or vice versa. RVTD runs the diesel New Flyer Low Floor and Low Floor Restyled coach and the Gillig Low Floor exclusively, however that may change as future fleet acquisitions occur. Previously in district history the entire fleet consisted of the New Look with a blue, yellow, and white paint scheme but the coaches have since been phased out.
