= Vogel Plaza =

Public square in Medford, Oregon, U.S.

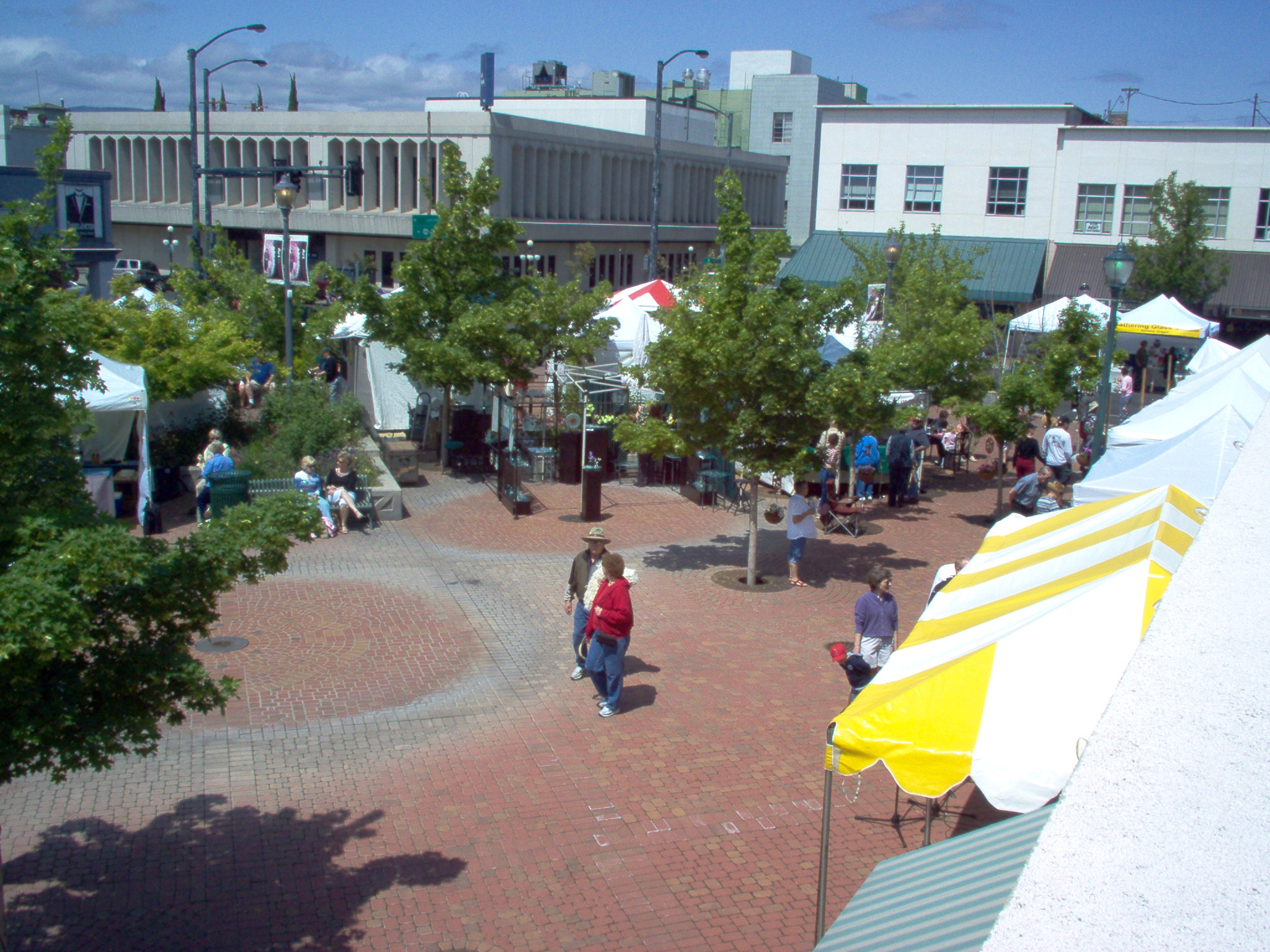
- The plaza in 2007

- Location within Oregon
- Location: Medford, Oregon, U.S.
- Coordinates: 42.32641°N 122.87186°W

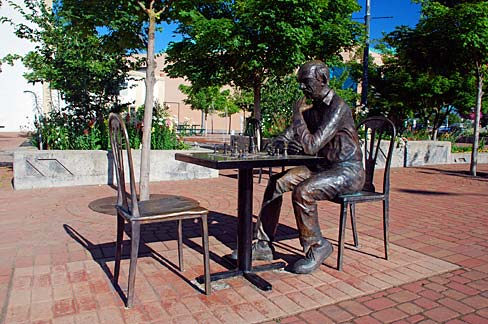
Statue in the plaza in 2008

Vogel Plaza is a town square at the intersection of E. Main Street and Central Avenue in Medford, Oregon, United States. It is named for Medford's first city councillor Virginia Vogel. The site has hosted many demonstrations and protests, such as a rally for immigrants rights in mid 2018, another after the resignation of Attorney General Jeff Sessions in 2018, and one for Earth Day 2019. The plaza hosted the city's first menorah lighting in 2017. The plaza has a statue of a man playing chess. The city selected an artist to paint a mural on the side of one of the buildings neighboring the plaza in 2019.
