= KRTA =

- Medford, Oregon; United States
- Broadcast area: Medford-Ashland
- Frequency: 610 kHz
- Branding: La Gran D

Programming
- Format: Regional Mexican Spanish hits

Ownership
- Owner: Opus Broadcasting Systems
- Sister stations: KCNA; KROG; KRVC

History
- First air date: 1947 (as KYJC at 1230)
- Former call signs: KYJC (1947–1995)
- Former frequencies: 1230 kHz (1947–1983)

Technical information
- Licensing authority: FCC
- Facility ID: 19557
- Class: B
- Power: 2,500 watts day 5,000 watts night
- Transmitter coordinates: 42°23′15″N 122°46′11″W

Links
- Public license information: Public file; LMS
- Webcast: Listen Live
- Website: opusradio.com/610am

KRTA (610 AM) is a radio station broadcasting a Spanish music format. Licensed to Medford, Oregon, United States, the station serves the Medford-Ashland area. The station is currently owned by Opus Broadcasting Systems.

== History ==
Studio and tower on Barnett road, 1956. Click for time lapse from 1949 to 1998

In August of 1947, Medford Printing Company, owner of the Medford Mail Tribune, was granted a construction permit for KYJC, to operate at 250 watts on 1230 kHz. Robert W. Ruhl, owner of the company, was station president. The studio and transmitting tower were at 1840 Barnett Road, (42.3153°N 122.8446°W) about a mile east of state highway 99. By October, the station had begun transmission.

On Mar 1, 1974, KYJC was acquired by Mattco Inc., under Russell H. Mathias, president.

In 1983, KYJC was granted a construction permit to change operation to 610 kHz, at its current transmitting facility on Dry Creek road.

In July of 1991, Frederick Danz acquired KYJC along with a Grants Pass station, KFMJ(FM), for $63,634.
