= Medford Carnegie Library =

Historic library in Oregon

- U.S. National Register of Historic Places
- U.S. Historic district – Contributing property
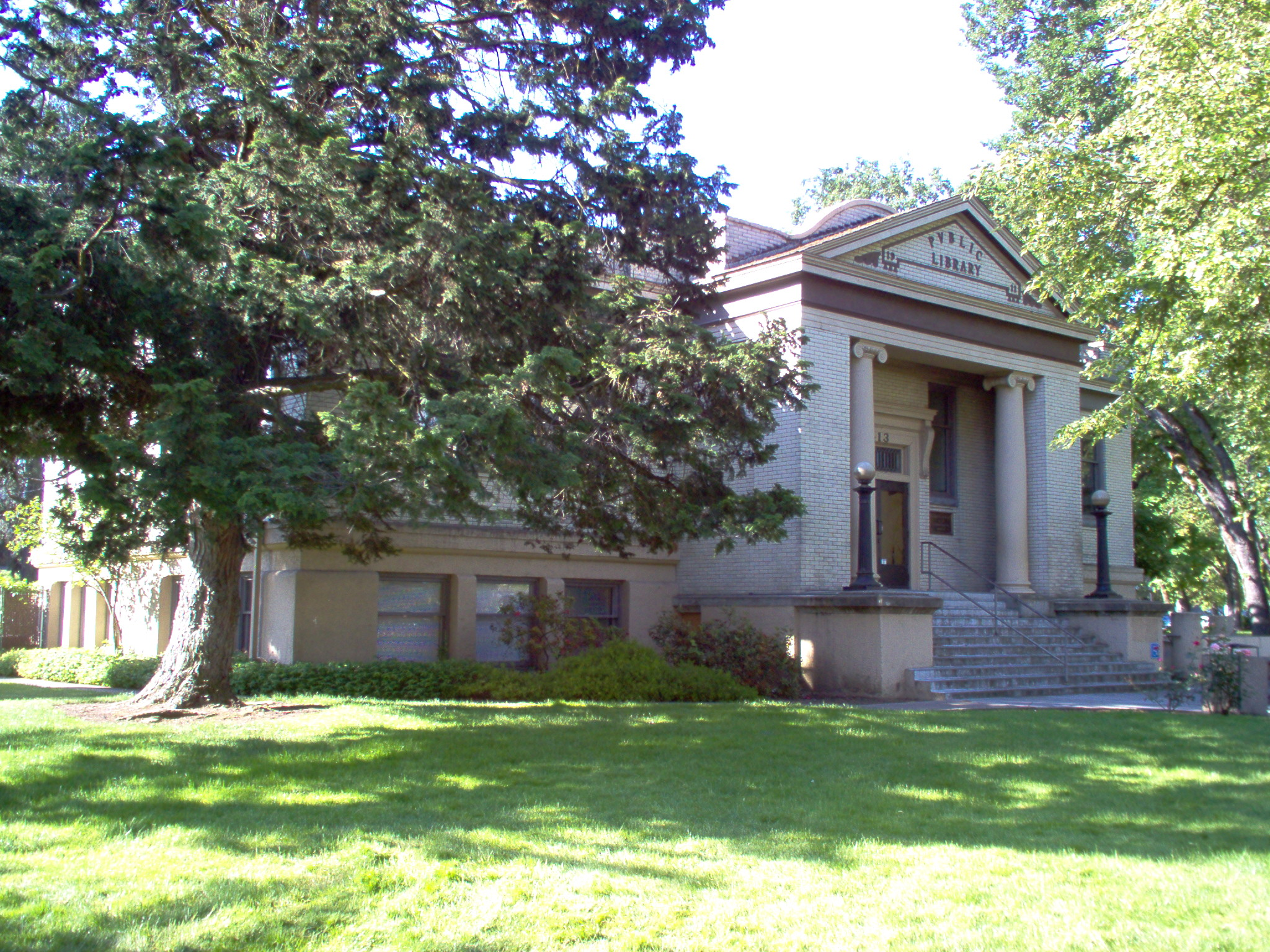
- Medford Carnegie Library

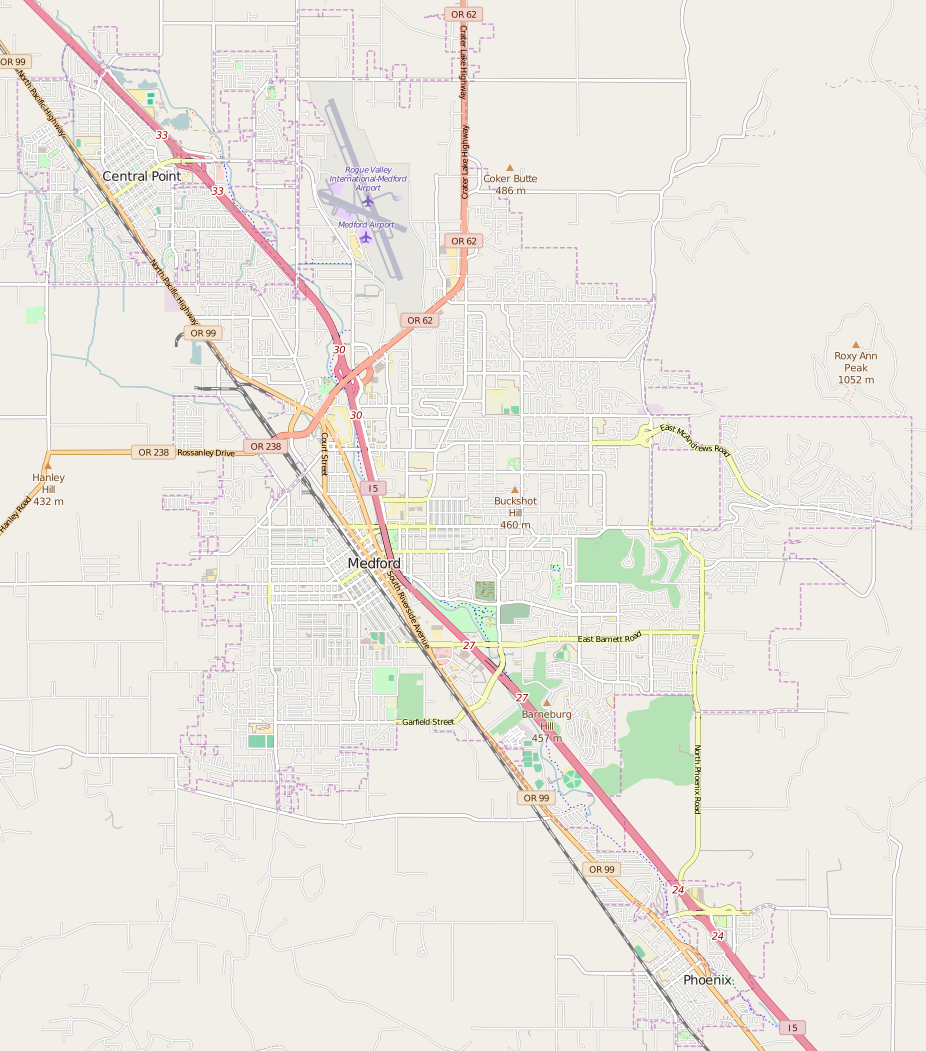
- Location within Medford OR Location within Oregon
- Location: 413 W. Main Street; Medford, Oregon
- Coordinates: 42°19′25″N 122°52′36″W
- Built: 1911
- Architect: McIntosh, J.A.; Ivey, Alfred
- Architectural style: Classical Revival
- Part of: Medford Downtown Historic District (ID98000949)
- NRHP reference No.: 81000493
- Added to NRHP: July 30, 1981

The Medford Carnegie Library is a two-story library building located in Medford, Oregon, United States. The building was erected in 1911 (completed in 1912) as a gift from Andrew Carnegie. The Carnegie Library building was vacated in 2004 when all services were moved to a new library building in downtown Medford.

Throughout 2009, the building was occupied by various city offices while renovations were being completed on the existing Medford city hall building. The city spent about $210,000 to have Grants Pass-based Ausland Builders Inc. refurbish about an eighth of the 16,000-square-foot structure to make way for the temporary office space in the old children's book section. The work involved seismic upgrades, insulation, new windows and ceilings.

After City Hall renovations were complete city offices relocated back and further restoration efforts continued on the Carnegie Building. To date, nearly $1 million in renovations have been made to the building. The city awarded an $800,000 construction bid to S&B James Construction, based in White City, to replace the library's windows and overhaul its heating and air cooling system. The construction money came from various Oregon Department of Energy grants and federal stimulus dollars.

== See also ==
- Carnegie library
