= KRVC =

- Hornbrook, California; United States
- Broadcast area: Medford-Ashland, Oregon
- Frequency: 98.9 MHz
- Branding: Hot 98.9

Programming
- Format: CHR/Pop
- Affiliations: Compass Media Networks; Premiere Networks

Ownership
- Owner: Opus Broadcasting Systems, Inc.
- Sister stations: KCNA, KROG, KRTA

History
- First air date: 2007

Technical information
- Licensing authority: FCC
- Facility ID: 165983
- Class: C2
- ERP: 1,250 watts
- HAAT: 757 meters
- Transmitter coordinates: 42°4′57.6″N 122°42′5.7″W

Links
- Public license information: Public file; LMS
- Webcast: Listen Live
- Website: KRVC Online

KRVC (98.9 FM) is a radio station broadcasting a CHR/Pop format. Licensed to Hornbrook, California, United States, the station serves the Medford-Ashland area. The station is currently owned by Opus Broadcasting Systems, Inc.
