= KCNA (FM) =

- Cave Junction, Oregon; United States
- Broadcast area: Medford-Ashland, Oregon
- Frequency: 102.7 MHz
- Branding: 102.7 The Drive

Programming
- Format: Classic hits
- Affiliations: Compass Media Networks; United Stations Radio Networks

Ownership
- Owner: Opus Broadcasting Systems
- Sister stations: KROG; KRTA; KRVC

History
- First air date: 1981 (as KBGG)
- Former call signs: KBGG (1981–1989)

Technical information
- Licensing authority: FCC
- Facility ID: 10528
- Class: C
- ERP: 100,000 watts
- HAAT: 602 meters (1,975 ft)
- Transmitter coordinates: 42°15′30″N 123°39′38″W
- Translators: 98.3 K252CP (Roseburg); 98.9 K255AJ (Myrtle Creek)
- Repeaters: 102.7 KCNA-FM1 (Jacksonville, Etc.)

Links
- Public license information: Public file; LMS
- Webcast: Listen Live
- Website: opusradio.com/102-7fm/

KCNA (102.7 MHz, "102.7 The Drive") is a commercial classic hits music FM radio station in Cave Junction, Oregon, broadcasting to the Medford-Ashland, Oregon area. The station is currently owned by Opus Broadcasting Systems.

== Translators and booster ==
KCNA broadcasts on the following translators and booster:

Broadcast translators for KCNA
Call sign	Frequency	City of license	FID	ERP (W)	Class	FCC info
K252CP	98.3 FM	Roseburg, Oregon	32955	19	D	LMS
K255AJ	98.9 FM	Myrtle Creek, Oregon	83034	10	D	LMS
KCNA-FM1	102.7 FM	Jacksonville, Oregon	132558	4,100	D	LMS
