= Medford Pear Blossom Festival =

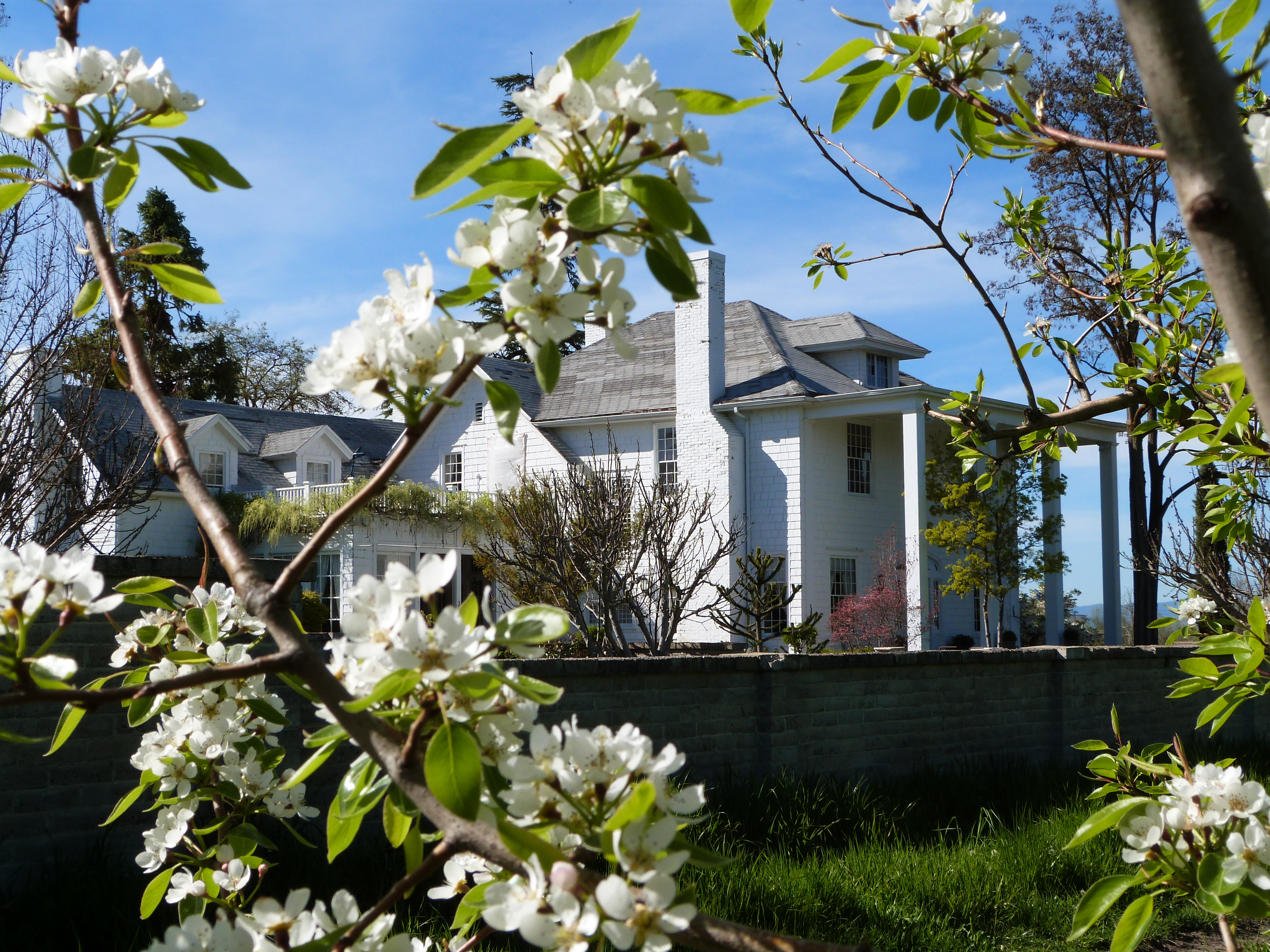
Pears in blossom in a Medford orchard in April 2016.

The Medford Pear Blossom Festival is an annual spring parade and festival in Medford, Oregon. It is held in April to mark the time when pear trees that are a traditional part of the town's economy come into blossom. It was founded in 1954.

The event includes seasonal activities such as promotion of local agriculture, a running race, cycling events along the Rogue River and a pageant.

In 1967, Leonard Nimoy was invited to act as grand marshal and provided the parade with the only known appearance of Nimoy as Spock of Star Trek fame in public.

There was no festival in 2020 on grounds of COVID-19 pandemic.
