= KIFS =

Rhythmic adult contemporary radio station in Ashland, Oregon

- Ashland, Oregon; United States
- Broadcast area: Medford; Ashland, Oregon
- Frequency: 107.5 MHz
- Branding: 107.5 The Beat

Programming
- Language: English
- Format: Rhythmic adult contemporary

Ownership
- Owner: Bicoastal Media Licenses VI, LLC
- Sister stations: KRWQ; KLDZ; KMED

History
- First air date: November 1996
- Former call signs: KKJJ (1996–2000)
- Call sign meaning: Sounds like "kiss" with the F representing an S (previous branding)

Technical information
- Licensing authority: FCC
- Facility ID: 42657
- Class: C2
- ERP: 5,800 watts
- HAAT: 419 meters (1,375 ft)
- Transmitter coordinates: 42°17′54″N 122°44′53″W
- Translator: 93.1 K226CY (Grants Pass)

Links
- Public license information: Public file; LMS
- Webcast: Listen live
- Website: 1075thebeat.com

KIFS (107.5 FM) is a radio station broadcasting a rhythmic adult contemporary format. Licensed to Ashland, Oregon, United States, the station serves the Medford-Ashland area. The station is currently owned by Bicoastal Media Licenses VI, LLC. The station is branded "107.5 The Beat".

== History ==
107.5 KKJJ came on the air in November 1996, with a hot adult contemporary format. When the station was acquired by Clear Channel, it became Top 40, KIFS in March 2000, as "Kiss 107 FM" with Rick Dees in the Morning.

On December 18, 2023, at midnight, KIFS abruptly dropped the Top 40 format and shifted to a rhythmic adult contemporary format (deemed by the station as "rhythmic gold") focused on classic pop hits from the 1980s through the 2000s, branded as "107.5 The Beat".

== Translators ==
KIFS broadcasts on the following translator:

Broadcast translator for KIFS
Call sign	Frequency	City of license	FID	ERP (W)	Class	FCC info
K226CY	93.1 FM	Grants Pass, Oregon	40984	200 (horiz.)	D	LMS
