= KRWQ =

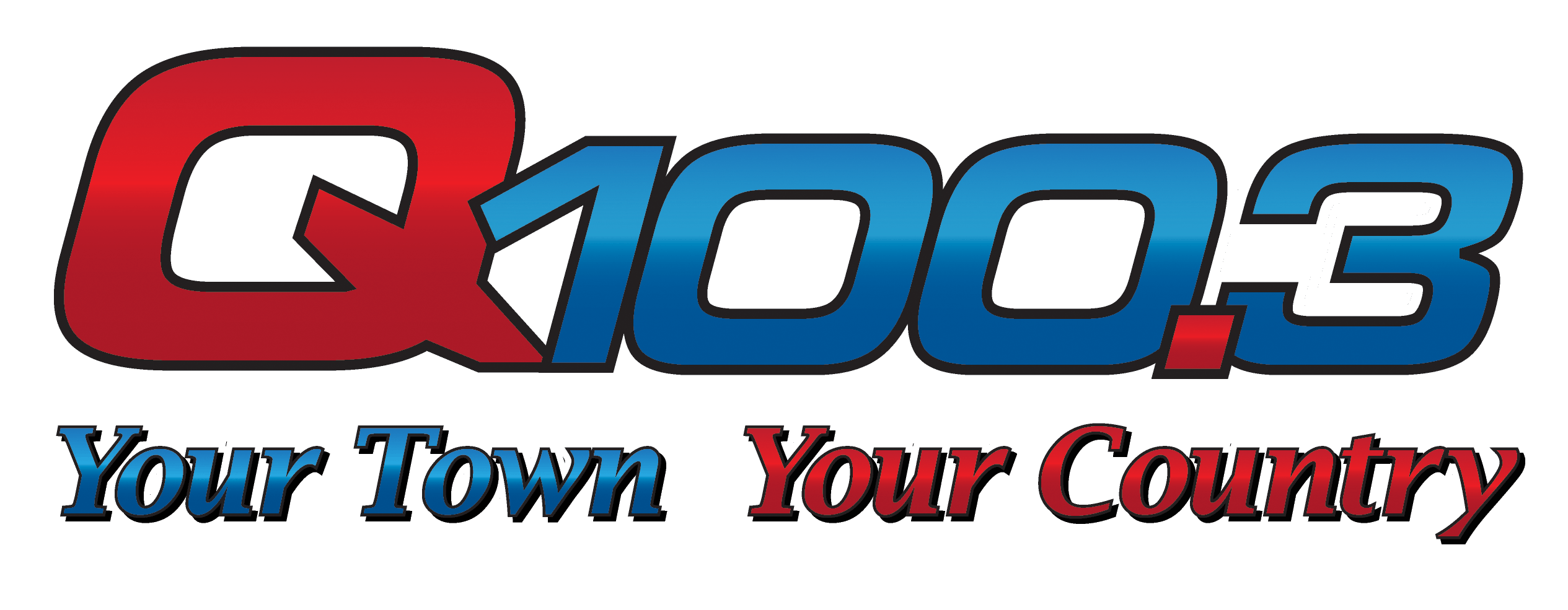
- Gold Hill, Oregon; United States
- Broadcast area: Medford-Ashland, Oregon
- Frequency: 100.3 MHz
- Branding: Q100.3

Programming
- Format: Country
- Affiliations: Compass Media Networks; Westwood One

Ownership
- Owner: Bicoastal Media Licenses VI, LLC
- Sister stations: KLDZ, KIFS, KMED

History
- First air date: 1980

Technical information
- Licensing authority: FCC
- Facility ID: 27229
- Class: C1
- ERP: 30,000 watts
- HAAT: 306 meters (1,004 ft)
- Transmitter coordinates: 42°27′11″N 123°03′22″W
- Translator: see below

Links
- Public license information: Public file; LMS
- Webcast: Listen Live
- Website: q1003.com

KRWQ (100.3 FM) is a radio station broadcasting a country music format. Licensed to Gold Hill, Oregon, United States, the station serves the Medford-Ashland area. The station is currently owned by Bicoastal Media Licenses VI, LLC. The station features Big D and Bubba in the mornings. Angie Foster - Mid days, and longtime market veteran Bryce Burtner - afternoons.

== Translators ==
KRWQ broadcasts on the following translators:

Call sign	Frequency	City of license	FID	ERP (W)	Class	FCC info
K254BS	98.7 FM	Grants Pass, Oregon	27230	99 horizontal	D	LMS
K254BT	98.7 FM	Cave Junction, Oregon	27231	71	D	LMS
K276FP	103.1 FM	Jacksonville, Oregon	27227	250 vertical	D	LMS

== Previous logo ==
(KRWQ's logo under previous branding)
