= KLDZ =

- Medford, Oregon; United States
- Broadcast area: Medford-Ashland, Oregon
- Frequency: 103.5 MHz
- Branding: MeTV-FM 103.5

Programming
- Format: Soft AC; oldies
- Affiliations: MeTV-FM

Ownership
- Owner: Bicoastal Media
- Sister stations: KRWQ, KIFS, KMED

History
- First air date: 1991 (as KOPE)
- Former call signs: KOPE (1988–1999)
- Call sign meaning: K OLDieZ former format

Technical information
- Licensing authority: FCC
- Facility ID: 40983
- Class: C1
- ERP: 100,000 watts
- HAAT: 146 meters
- Transmitter coordinates: 42°17′13″N 123°00′15″W
- Translators: 92.9 K225DE (Ashland); 100.7 K264CA (Rogue River)

Links
- Public license information: Public file; LMS
- Webcast: Listen Live
- Website: metv.fm/kldz

KLDZ (103.5 FM, "MeTV-FM 103.5") is a radio station licensed to serve Medford, Oregon, United States. The station is owned by Bicoastal Media. It airs a soft oldies music format.

Previous KOOL 103.5 personalities included Scuba Steve in the afternoons. KOOL was also home for American Top 40 rebroadcasts from the 1970s and 1980s featuring Casey Kasem.

== History ==
The 103.5 frequency was originally licensed to Medford as KOPE. Founded by Roy Masters, it was one of the first FM talk stations in the U.S. and locally featured legendary paranormal author/talker, Art Bell. After being sold to Citicasters Co. (soon to merge with Clear Channel), the station was assigned the KLDZ call letters by the Federal Communications Commission on February 1, 1999.

On September 14, 2026. KLDZ 103.5 switched to MeTV-FM.

== Translators ==
Broadcast translators for KLDZ
Call sign	Frequency	City of license	FID	ERP (W)	Class	FCC info
K225DE	92.9 FM	Ashland, Oregon	40987	99	D	LMS
K264CA	100.7 FM	Rogue River, Oregon	40985	99 horizontal	D	LMS
