= KMED (FM) =

- Eagle Point, Oregon; United States
- Broadcast area: Medford-Ashland, Oregon
- Frequency: 106.3 MHz (HD Radio)
- Branding: KMED 105.9 106.3 106.7

Programming
- Format: News/talk
- Subchannels: HD2: Adult album alternative "105.5 106.3-HD2 The Valley"
- Affiliations: Compass Media Networks; Premiere Networks; Salem Radio Network; Townhall

Ownership
- Owner: Bicoastal Media; (Bicoastal Media Licenses VI, LLC)
- Sister stations: KRWQ, KLDZ, KIFS

History
- First air date: 1995 (as KZZE)
- Former call signs: KZZE (1994–2015); KYVL (2015–2023)
- Call sign meaning: Medford

Technical information
- Licensing authority: FCC
- Facility ID: 60181
- Class: C3
- ERP: 1,000 watts
- HAAT: 480 meters (1,570 ft)
- Transmitter coordinates: 42°21′12″N 122°47′8″W
- Translators: 105.9 K290AF (Rogue River); 106.7 K294AS (Ashland); HD2: 105.5 K288CP (Ashland)

Links
- Public license information: Public file; LMS
- Webcast: Listen live; HD2: Listen live
- Website: kmed.com; HD2: www.thevalley.fm

KMED (106.3 MHz) is an FM radio station licensed to Eagle Point, Oregon, United States, and serving the Medford-Ashland area. The station is owned by Bicoastal Media.

== History ==
In the late 1990s, the station was branded as "Eagle 106.3" with a rock format. By the early 2000s, the format had evolved to active rock as "106-3 KZZE". On August 3, 2015, at 12:00 pm, KZZE flipped to an adult album alternative format known as "106.3 The Valley" and changed its call letters to KYVL.

On January 8, 2023, KYVL moved the adult album alternative format to its HD2 subchannel and picked up sister station KMED's news/talk format, with the sign-off of KMED's 1440 AM frequency. KYVL's translators began relaying the HD2 subchannel. On January 11, the stations swapped call signs, with 106.3 assuming KMED.

== Translators ==
KMED broadcasts on the following translators:

Broadcast translators for KMED
Call sign	Frequency	City of license	FID	ERP (W)	Class	FCC info
K290AF	105.9 FM	Rogue River, Oregon	77760	80	D	LMS
K294AS	106.7 FM	Ashland, Oregon	77759	70	D	LMS

Broadcast translator for KMED-HD2
Call sign	Frequency	City of license	FID	ERP (W)	Class	FCC info
K288CP	105.5 FM	Ashland, Oregon	27228	230	D	LMS
