= 106.7 FM =

FM radio frequency

The following radio stations broadcast on FM frequency 106.7 MHz:

== Argentina ==
- LRR330 Cielo in Apóstoles, Misiones
- LRM384 Génesis in San Pedro, Buenos Aires
- Horizonte in Córdoba
- Imagen in Alcorta, Santa Fe
- Laser in Merlo, San Luis
- LV3 Cadena 3 Rosario in Rosario, Santa Fe
- Millenium in Buenos Aires
- Radio María in Saladas, Corrientes
- Radio María in Santiago del Estero
- Retro in San José, Entre Ríos
- Soñada in Las Parejas, Santa Fe
- Trip in Rosario, Santa Fe

== Australia ==
- 2KY in Orange, New South Wales
- 3HOT in Mildura, Victoria
- 3PBS in Melbourne, Victoria
- Radio National in Spencer Gulf, South Australia

== Canada (Channel 294) ==
- CBHB-FM in Mulgrave, Nova Scotia
- CFDV-FM in Red Deer, Alberta
- CFET-FM in Tagish, Yukon
- CHSV-FM in Hudson/Saint-Lazare, Quebec
- CIKZ-FM in Kitchener/Waterloo, Ontario
- CION-FM-2 in Chicoutimi, Quebec
- CJIT-FM in Lac Megantic, Quebec
- CJRX-FM in Lethbridge/Taber, Alberta
- CJWT-FM in Timmins, Ontario
- VF2347 in Logan Lake, British Columbia
- VF2557 in Pemberton, British Columbia
- VF2577 in 100 Mile House, British Columbia

== China ==
- CNR The Voice of China in Baicheng
- CNR Business Radio in Wuyishan
- Luhe Radio in Shanwei

== Europe ==
- Radio Centraal in Antwerp, Belgium
- Europa FM in Bucharest, Romania

== Indonesia ==
- Mara FM (PM3FHQ) in Bandung
- Merdeka FM in Surabaya

== Malaysia ==
- Ai FM in Selangor and Western Pahang
- Minnal FM in Kota Bharu, Kelantan
- Radio Klasik in Johor Bahru, Johor and Singapore

== Mexico ==
- XEWV-FM in Mexicali, Baja California
- XHEPQ-FM in La Loma, Coahuila
- XHOJ-FM on Cerro Grande Santa Fe (Guadalajara), Jalisco
- XHPBP-FM in Puebla, Puebla
- XHQH-FM in Ixmiquilpan, Hidalgo
- XHSCBU-FM in Xalatlaco, Estado de México
- XHSCEW-FM in Teposcolula, Oaxaca
- XHSCHY-FM in Tlatlauquitepec, Puebla
- XHSCIG-FM in Río Grande, Zacatecas
- XHSIAH-FM in Ejido Ignacio Zaragoza, Berriozabal municipality, Chiapas
- XHSIAX-FM in Rancho Viejo, Santa Cruz Zenzontepec municipality, Oaxaca
- XHSILL-FM in Hermosillo, Sonora
- XHSN-FM in Nogales, Sonora
- XHTLAN-FM in Mazatlán, Sinaloa
- XHTPC-FM in Tapachula, Chiapas
- XHUAR-FM in Ciudad Juárez, Chihuahua
- XHVK-FM in Gómez Palacio, Durango (clear to 100.7)

== New Zealand ==
- Various low-power stations up to 1 watt

== Palestine ==
- Al-Aqsa Voice Radio in Dabas Mall, Tulkarem

== Philippines ==
- DWET-FM in Metro Manila, Philippines
- DYQC in Cebu City, Philippines
- DXET in Davao City, Philippines
- DXZP in Zamboanga City, Philippines

== United Kingdom ==
- Clyde 1 (Ayrshire) in Rothesay
- Greatest Hits Radio in Plymouth
- Radio Wyvern in Worcestershire

== United States (Channel 294) ==
- KAAZ-FM in Spanish Fork, Utah
- KBFO in Aberdeen, South Dakota
- KBPI in Denver, Colorado
- KBZU in Benton, Arkansas
- KCHX in Midland, Texas
- KDKN in Ellington, Missouri
- KDVA in Buckeye, Arizona
- KGJN-LP in Grand Junction, Colorado
- KGPZ-LP in Grants Pass, Oregon
- KGTN-LP in Georgetown, Texas
- KGTW in Ketchikan, Alaska
- KHGN in Hugoton, Kansas
- KHOX-LP in Walnut Ridge, Arkansas
- KIEZ-LP in Monroe, Louisiana
- KIKD in Lake City, Iowa
- KIRQ in Hailey, Idaho
- KIXT in Hewitt, Texas
- KJIT-LP in Bismarck, North Dakota
- KJKB in Early, Texas
- KJUG-FM in Tulare, California
- KKOS-LP in McPherson, Kansas
- KKND in Port Sulphur, Louisiana
- KKWN in Cashmere, Washington
- KLLF-LP in Roseburg, Oregon
- KLTH in Lake Oswego, Oregon
- KMRZ-FM in Superior, Wyoming
- KNAN in Nanakuli, Hawaii
- KNKI in Pinetop, Arizona
- KPCT-LP in Parachute, Colorado
- KPLN in Lockwood, Montana
- KPQS in Waterford, California
- KQKX in Norfolk, Nebraska
- KQNK-FM in Norton, Kansas
- KQTY-FM in Borger, Texas
- KROQ-FM in Pasadena, California
- KRQR in Orland, California
- KRTI in Grinnell, Iowa
- KRVI in Mount Vernon, Missouri
- KSMY in Lompoc, California
- KSOW-LP in Cottage Grove, Oregon
- KTKX in Terrell Hills, Texas
- KTPO in Kootenai, Idaho
- KTUZ-FM in Okarche, Oklahoma
- KTYG-LP in Centralia, Washington
- KUMX in North Fort Polk, Louisiana
- KVCN in Los Alamos, New Mexico
- KWLL-FM in Rayne, Louisiana
- KXDR in Pinesdale, Montana
- KYTZ in Walhalla, North Dakota
- KYXA in Homer, Louisiana
- KZJZ in Babbitt, Minnesota
- KZLX-LP in Maryville, Missouri
- KZZA in Muenster, Texas
- WAKL in Gainesville, Georgia
- WAOB-FM in Beaver Falls, Pennsylvania
- WATQ in Chetek, Wisconsin
- WBDR in Copenhagen, New York
- WCDW in Port Dickinson, New York
- WDBP-LP in Rocky Mount, North Carolina
- WEAD-LP in Wendell, North Carolina
- WFBT in Carolina Beach, North Carolina
- WFGA in Hicksville, Ohio
- WFGW in Norris, Tennessee
- WGGP-LP in Big Pine Key, Florida
- WHFI in Lindside, West Virginia
- WHTO in Iron Mountain, Michigan
- WIXP-LP in Greenville, Mississippi
- WIZN in Vergennes, Vermont
- WJFK-FM in Manassas, Virginia
- WJJY-FM in Brainerd, Minnesota
- WKGS in Irondequoit, New York
- WKMX in Enterprise, Alabama
- WKRU in Allouez, Wisconsin
- WKVK in Semora, North Carolina
- WLFX in Berea, Kentucky
- WLLZ in Detroit, Michigan
- WLQQ in West Lafayette, Indiana
- WLTW in New York, New York
- WMJX in Boston, Massachusetts
- WMVI in Mount Vernon, Indiana
- WNFN in Franklin, Tennessee
- WNKR in Williamstown, Kentucky
- WOKA-FM in Douglas, Georgia
- WPPN in Des Plaines, Illinois
- WPWQ in Mount Sterling, Illinois
- WRHC-LP in Three Oaks, Michigan
- WRIS-FM in Mount Horeb, Wisconsin
- WSIB-LP in Athens, Ohio
- WSMU-LP in Raleigh, North Carolina
- WSRT in Gaylord, Michigan
- WSTZ-FM in Vicksburg, Mississippi
- WTCB in Orangeburg, South Carolina
- WTLC-FM in Greenwood, Indiana
- WTUB-LP in Lizemores, West Virginia
- WVKM in Matewan, West Virginia
- WVLH-LP in Coudersport, Pennsylvania
- WWKL in Hershey, Pennsylvania
- WWZD-FM in New Albany, Mississippi
- WXDJ in Fort Lauderdale, Florida
- WXTP in North Windham, Maine
- WXXL in Tavares, Florida
- WYEJ-LP in Anderson, South Carolina
- WZCB in Dublin, Ohio
- WZNX in Sullivan, Illinois
- WZZL in Reidland, Kentucky
