= KSIG =

KSIG may refer to:

- KSIG (AM), a radio station (1450 AM) licensed to serve Crowley, Louisiana, United States
- KWLL-FM, a radio station (106.7 FM) licensed to serve Rayne, Louisiana, which held the call sign KSIG-FM from 1997 to 1998 and from 2014 to 2018
- Kappa Sigma, an American fraternity
