= KQTY =

KQTY may refer to:

- KQTY-FM, a radio station (106.7 FM) licensed to serve Borger, Texas, United States
- KQTY (AM), a defunct radio station (1490 AM) formerly licensed to serve Borger, Texas
