= HVHS =

HVHS may refer to:

- Harbour View High School, in Saint John, New Brunswick, Canada
- Hidden Valley High School (Grants Pass, Oregon), United States
- Hidden Valley High School (Virginia), in Roanoke, Virginia, United States
- Hoosac Valley High School, in Cheshire, Massachusetts, United States
- Hutt Valley High School, in Lower Hutt, New Zealand
