= North Valley =

North Valley may refer to:

- North Valley High School, Oregon
- North Valley (San Jose), California
- North Valley, New Mexico
