= Grants Pass, Oregon =

- City
- City of Grants Pass, Oregon
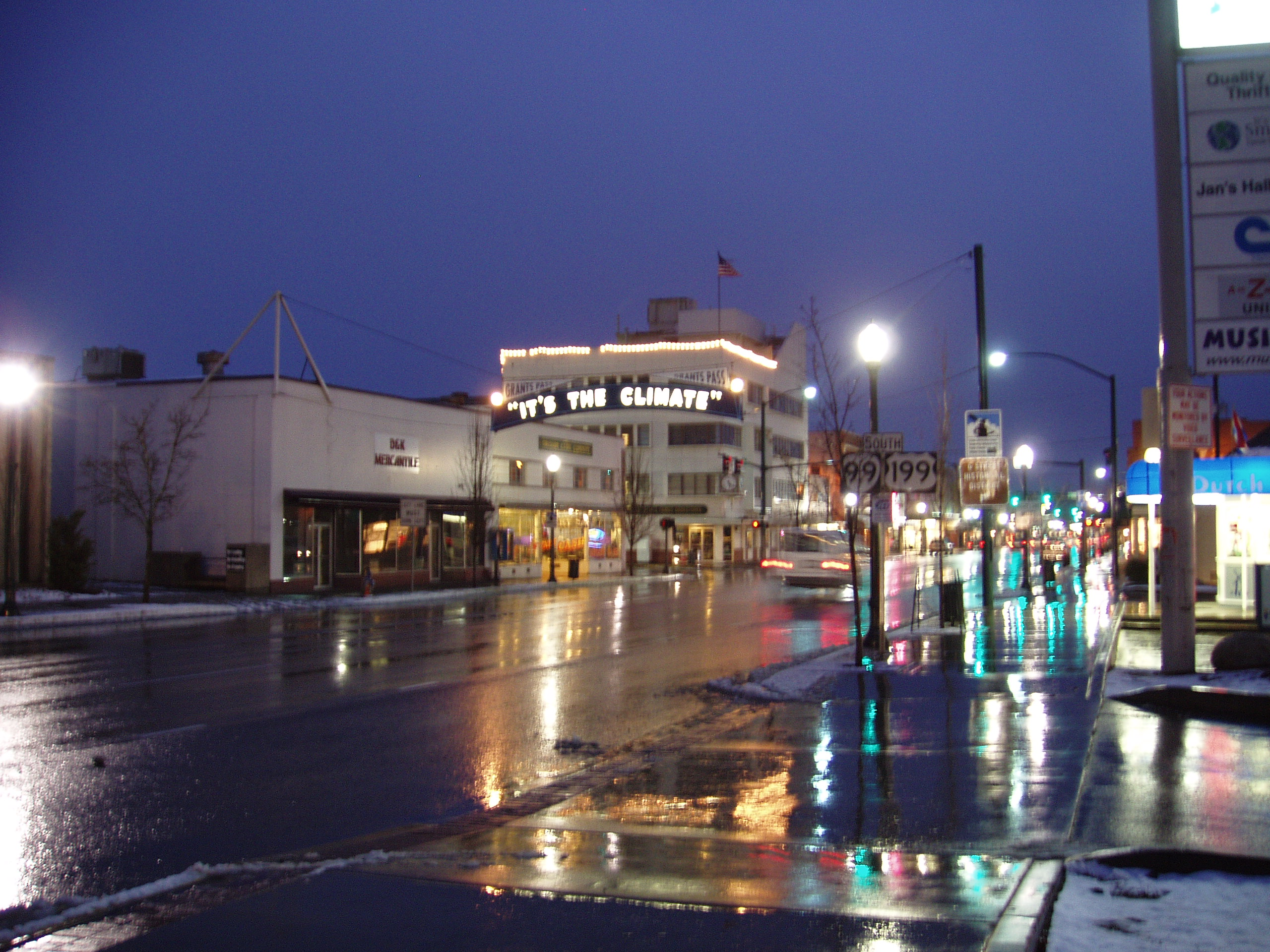
- Motto(s): Live Rogue; It's the Climate
- Location in Josephine County and the state of Oregon

- Location in Oregon Location in the United States
- Coordinates: 42°26′20″N 123°19′42″W
- Country: United States
- State: Oregon
- County: Josephine
- Incorporated: 1887

Government
  - Mayor: Clint Scherf
  - City Manager: Aaron Cubic

Area
  - Total: 11.68 sq mi (30.25 km^{2})
  - Land: 11.52 sq mi (29.83 km^{2})
  - Water: 0.16 sq mi (0.42 km^{2})
- Elevation: 960 ft (290 m)

Population (2020)
  - Total: 39,189
  - Density: 3,402.2/sq mi (1,313.58/km^{2})

GDP
  - Metro: $3.877 billion (2023)
- Time zone: UTC−8 (Pacific)
  - Summer (DST): UTC−7 (Pacific)
- ZIP codes: 97526, 97527, 97528, 97543
- Area codes: 541 and 458
- FIPS code: 41-30550
- GNIS feature ID: 1142947
- Website: www.grantspassoregon.gov

Grants Pass is a city in and the county seat of Josephine County, Oregon, United States. The city is located on Interstate 5, northwest of Medford, along the Rogue River. The population is 39,194 according to the 2020 census, making it the 15th most populous city in Oregon.

== History ==
The Takelma Native American tribe was the original inhabitant population of the region.

Early Hudson's Bay Company hunters and trappers, following the Siskiyou Trail, passed through the site beginning in the 1820s. In the late 1840s, settlers following the Applegate Trail began traveling through the area on their way to the Willamette Valley. The city states that the name was selected to honor General Ulysses S. Grant's incredible success in the Vicksburg Campaign. The Grants Pass post office was established on March 22, 1865. The city of Grants Pass was incorporated in 1887.

The Oregon–Utah Sugar Company, financed by Charles W. Nibley, was created, leading to a sugar beet factory being built in Grants Pass in 1916. Before the factory opened, Oregon-Utah Sugar was merged into the Utah-Idaho Sugar Company. Due to labor shortages and low acreage planted in sugar beets, the processing machinery was moved to Toppenish, Washington, in 1918 or 1919.

Grants Pass was formerly a sundown town. The Ku Klux Klan was active from the 1920s to 1960s.

Beginning in the early 1970s, the regional timber industry that had long sustained Grants Pass, Josephine County, and many of Oregon's timber towns entered a prolonged decline. Automation, particularly laser-controlled milling equipment, sharply reduced the labor needed in sawmills, and Oregon's timber employment fell steadily from the late 1970s onward. The downturn deepened after the 1994 Northwest Forest Plan, which set federal timber harvests in the region at roughly 1.2 billion board feet a year, a decline of about 70 percent from 1970s levels. At least twenty sawmills, veneer, and plywood mills closed across Jackson, Josephine, and Curry Counties after 1980, costing the region thousands of jobs.

Because Josephine County had funded public services largely through a share of federal timber-sale revenue rather than local property taxes, the decline hit county government especially hard. Federal safety-net payments partially offset the losses through the 2000s, peaking around 2006 at $12 to 15 million a year, before beginning to wind down after 2011. By 2013, the Josephine County sheriff's department had lost more than half its funding and laid off roughly 80 percent of its deputies, leaving evening and weekend 911 calls unanswered in much of the county. The crisis peaked in November 2014, when voters rejected a $12 million levy meant to close the budget gap, prompting the sheriff and district attorney to lay off 70 deputies and staff, release about 90 jail inmates, and cut law enforcement to a level not seen since the county's 1850s gold-rush settlement.

Despite fiscal strain, Grants Pass kept growing throughout the period. The city's population rose steadily across three decades, with this growth coming more from retirees and families moving in than from local job creation. Much of the in-migration came from California: between 1999 and 2005, more than 30 percent of out-of-state driver's licenses surrendered to Oregon's DMV in the area came from California residents, part of a broader wave of net interstate in-migration to Oregon that totaled roughly 26,000 more arrivals than departures in the Grants Pass area during the 1990s alone. The city eventually leaned into this identity in its official motto, "It's the Climate," first raised on a downtown sign in 1920.

In the twenty-first century, Grants Pass became the origin of a major U.S. Supreme Court case on homelessness policy. In 2018, homeless residents sued the city over its enforcement of public-camping bans, arguing the citations amounted to cruel and unusual punishment when no shelter space was available. The case, City of Grants Pass v. Johnson, reached the U.S. Supreme Court, which ruled 6–3 on June 28, 2024, that cities may enforce such bans even without adequate shelter space. The decision reversed a Ninth Circuit precedent and was closely watched nationally, giving cities across the country broader latitude to regulate public camping.

== Geography ==
Grants Pass is located in the Rogue Valley; the Rogue River runs through the city. U.S. Route 199 passes through the city, and joins Interstate 5. The city has a total area of 11.03 square miles (28.6 km^{2}), of which 10.87 square miles (28.2 km^{2}) is land and 0.16 square miles (0.41 km^{2}) is water.

=== Climate ===
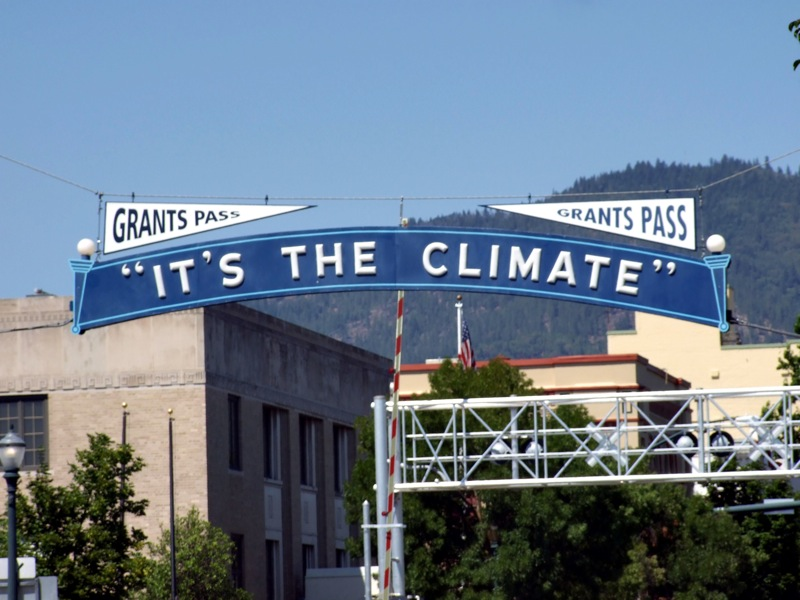
Welcome sign in Grants Pass

Grants Pass has a hot-summer Mediterranean climate (Köppen: Csa), and is in USDA plant hardiness zone 8b.

Summer days are sunny, dry and hot, with dramatic cooling at night; the average August high temperature is 90.6 °F (32.6 °C) and the low is 54.9 °F (12.7 °C). Winters are cool and fairly rainy, with only occasional snow; the average January high temperature is 47.6 °F (8.7 °C) and the low is 35.3 °F (1.8 °C). Grants Pass receives roughly 31 inches (790 mm) precipitation per year, with three-quarters of it occurring between November 1 and March 31. The mild winters and dry summers support a native vegetation structure quite different from the rest of Oregon, dominated by madrone, deciduous and evergreen oak, manzanita, pine, bush chinquapin, and other species that are far less abundant further north.

The record high temperature of 115 °F (46 °C) was on July 4, 2022. The record low temperature of −3 °F (−19 °C) was on December 21, 1990. There are an average of 51.3 afternoons annually with highs of 90 °F (32 °C) or higher, eight afternoons reaching at least 100 °F (38 °C), and 77.5 mornings annually with lows of 29 °F (−2 °C) or lower.

Measurable precipitation falls on an average of 110 days annually. The wettest rain year on record was from July 1955 to June 1956 with 50.69 inches (1,288 mm) of precipitation, and the driest from July 1923 to June 1924 with 13.43 inches (341 mm). The most precipitation in one month was 20.63 inches (524 mm) in December 1996, and the most precipitation in one day was 5.27 inches (134 mm) on October 29, 1950 – part of a two-day fall of 9.38 inches (238 mm) and ending a five-day fall of 11.26 inches (286 mm). There is an average of only 4.6 inches (0.12 m) of snow annually. The most snowfall in one month was 34.1 inches (0.87 m) in February 1917.

Climate data for Grants Pass, Oregon (1991–2020 normals, extremes 1893–present)
Month	Jan	Feb	Mar	Apr	May	Jun	Jul	Aug	Sep	Oct	Nov	Dec	Year
Record high °F (°C)	71 (22)	76 (24)	86 (30)	98 (37)	102 (39)	113 (45)	114 (46)	111 (44)	108 (42)	99 (37)	77 (25)	75 (24)	114 (46)
Mean maximum °F (°C)	59.0 (15.0)	65.1 (18.4)	74.3 (23.5)	83.5 (28.6)	93.0 (33.9)	97.5 (36.4)	102.8 (39.3)	103.1 (39.5)	97.9 (36.6)	85.1 (29.5)	68.0 (20.0)	59.1 (15.1)	105.3 (40.7)
Mean daily maximum °F (°C)	47.6 (8.7)	53.9 (12.2)	59.6 (15.3)	65.4 (18.6)	74.1 (23.4)	81.2 (27.3)	90.5 (32.5)	90.6 (32.6)	83.8 (28.8)	69.8 (21.0)	53.8 (12.1)	45.7 (7.6)	68.0 (20.0)
Daily mean °F (°C)	41.5 (5.3)	44.8 (7.1)	48.2 (9.0)	52.6 (11.4)	59.9 (15.5)	65.9 (18.8)	73.4 (23.0)	72.7 (22.6)	66.1 (18.9)	55.5 (13.1)	46.1 (7.8)	40.4 (4.7)	55.6 (13.1)
Mean daily minimum °F (°C)	35.3 (1.8)	35.6 (2.0)	36.9 (2.7)	39.8 (4.3)	45.7 (7.6)	50.5 (10.3)	56.3 (13.5)	54.9 (12.7)	48.3 (9.1)	41.1 (5.1)	38.5 (3.6)	35.1 (1.7)	43.2 (6.2)
Mean minimum °F (°C)	24.1 (−4.4)	24.9 (−3.9)	27.4 (−2.6)	30.2 (−1.0)	34.5 (1.4)	40.6 (4.8)	47.2 (8.4)	45.7 (7.6)	38.3 (3.5)	30.2 (−1.0)	26.2 (−3.2)	23.9 (−4.5)	19.5 (−6.9)
Record low °F (°C)	1 (−17)	5 (−15)	15 (−9)	20 (−7)	24 (−4)	30 (−1)	35 (2)	30 (−1)	24 (−4)	20 (−7)	12 (−11)	−1 (−18)	−1 (−18)
Average precipitation inches (mm)	5.08 (129)	3.97 (101)	3.65 (93)	2.31 (59)	1.39 (35)	0.68 (17)	0.37 (9.4)	0.26 (6.6)	0.56 (14)	2.07 (53)	4.42 (112)	6.55 (166)	31.31 (795)
Average snowfall inches (cm)	0.6 (1.5)	0.1 (0.25)	0.1 (0.25)	0.0 (0.0)	0.0 (0.0)	0.0 (0.0)	0.0 (0.0)	0.0 (0.0)	0.0 (0.0)	0.0 (0.0)	0.0 (0.0)	0.1 (0.25)	0.9 (2.3)
Average precipitation days (≥ 0.01 in)	17.1	14.3	15.5	13.4	8.6	4.5	1.9	1.6	3.3	8.0	15.8	16.8	120.8
Average snowy days (≥ 0.1 in)	0.5	0.4	0.2	0.0	0.0	0.0	0.0	0.0	0.0	0.0	0.0	0.2	1.3
Source: NOAA

== Demographics ==
Historical population
Census	Pop.	Note	%±
1880	250		—
1890	1,432		472.8%
1900	2,290		59.9%
1910	3,897		70.2%
1920	4,200		7.8%
1930	4,666		11.1%
1940	6,028		29.2%
1950	8,116		34.6%
1960	10,118		24.7%
1970	12,455		23.1%
1980	14,977		20.2%
1990	17,488		16.8%
2000	23,003		31.5%
2010	34,533		50.1%
2020	39,189		13.5%
Source: U.S. Decennial Census

=== 2020 census ===
As of the 2020 census, Grants Pass had a population of 39,189. The median age was 41.3 years. 21.7% of residents were under the age of 18 and 23.3% of residents were 65 years of age or older. For every 100 females there were 90.8 males, and for every 100 females age 18 and over there were 86.6 males age 18 and over.

99.7% of residents lived in urban areas, while 0.3% lived in rural areas.

There were 15,865 households in Grants Pass, of which 28.6% had children under the age of 18 living in them. Of all households, 40.2% were married-couple households, 17.9% were households with a male householder and no spouse or partner present, and 33.1% were households with a female householder and no spouse or partner present. About 31.5% of all households were made up of individuals and 17.1% had someone living alone who was 65 years of age or older.

There were 16,681 housing units, of which 4.9% were vacant. Among occupied housing units, 54.9% were owner-occupied and 45.1% were renter-occupied. The homeowner vacancy rate was 1.4% and the rental vacancy rate was 3.8%.

Racial composition as of the 2020 census
Race	Number	Percent
White	32,755	83.6%
Black or African American	225	0.6%
American Indian and Alaska Native	524	1.3%
Asian	506	1.3%
Native Hawaiian and Other Pacific Islander	83	0.2%
Some other race	1,242	3.2%
Two or more races	3,854	9.8%
Hispanic or Latino (of any race)	3,912	10.0%

=== 2010 census ===
As of the census of 2010, there were 34,533 people, 14,313 households, and 8,700 families residing in the city. The population density was 3,176.9 inhabitants per square mile (1,226.6/km^{2}). There were 15,561 housing units at an average density of 1,431.6 per square mile (552.7/km^{2}). The racial makeup of the city was 90.9% White, 1.2% Native American, 1.1% Asian, 0.5% African American, 0.3% Pacific Islander, 2.3% from other races, and 3.7% from two or more races. Hispanic or Latino of any race were 8.5% of the population.

There were 14,313 households, of which 30.7% had children under the age of 18 living with them, 41.3% were married couples living together, 14.5% had a female householder with no husband present, 4.9% had a male householder with no wife present, and 39.2% were non-families. 32.8% of all households were made up of individuals, and 16.3% had someone living alone who was 65 years of age or older. The average household size was 2.34 and the average family size was 2.94.

The median age in the city was 39.3 years. 24.3% of residents were under the age of 18; 8.4% were between the ages of 18 and 24; 23.6% were from 25 to 44; 25% were from 45 to 64; and 18.6% were 65 years of age or older. The gender makeup of the city was 47.3% male and 52.7% female.

=== 2000 census ===
As of the census of 2000, there were 23,003 people, 9,376 households, and 5,925 families residing in the city. The population density was 3,033 inhabitants per square mile (1,171/km^{2}). There were 9,885 housing units at an average density of 1,303.3 per square mile (503.2/km^{2}). By 2008, the city's population had increased to 33,239. According to U.S. Census figures from the 2006-2008 American Community Survey, the racial composition of the city's population was 93.6% white, 0.2% black, 1.6% American Indian, 1.1% Asian, 1.2% other race, and 2.3% two or more races. Hispanics or Latinos, who may be of any race, formed 7.2% of the city's population.

There were 9,376 households, out of which 31.1% had children under the age of 18 living with them, 44.5% were married couples living together, 14.5% had a female householder with no husband present, and 36.8% were non-families. 31.2% of all households were made up of individuals, and 16.0% had someone living alone who was 65 years of age or older. The average household size was 2.36 and the average family size was 2.94.

In the city, the population was spread out, with 26.0% under the age of 18, 8.1% from 18 to 24, 25.7% from 25 to 44, 20.7% from 45 to 64, and 19.4% who were 65 years of age or older. The median age was 38 years. For every 100 females, there were 86.8 males. For every 100 females age 18 and over, there were 80.7 males.

The median income for a household in the city was $29,197, and the median income for a family was $36,284. Males had a median income of $31,128 versus $23,579 for females. The per capita income for the city was $16,234. About 12.2% of families and 34.9% of the population were below the poverty line, including 20.8% of those under age 18 and 7.3% of those age 65 or over.

== Government and politics ==
The city council has 8 members as of 2019, representing 4 wards and are elected to 4 year terms by the city. The city council and mayor are not paid, and they volunteer their time. The council oversees the city government and chooses the city manager. The mayor's job is to provide leadership and preside over city council meetings. The Mayor can also issue vetoes and make a tiebreaker vote. Grants Pass is conservative leaning and represented in the United States House of Representatives by Congressman Cliff Bentz (R-Ontario). At the state level of politics, Grants Pass is represented in the Oregon Senate by Art Robinson (R-Cave Junction) who holds Oregon's 2nd Senate district, and represented in the Oregon House of Representatives by Lily Morgan (R-Grants Pass) holding Oregon's 3rd House district and Christine Goodwin (R-Grants Pass) holding Oregon's 4th House district.

== Economy ==
The lumber industry was the major employer for Grants Pass up until the early 1970s. At that point the entire region started to see a steady decline in all lumber harvesting, production, and processing. Since then there has been a shift to a large service industry sector covering areas of outdoors/sports/recreation and health care infrastructure. This is augmented by multiple small and medium businesses and growth in marijuana-related businesses due to state legalization.

The coffee chain Dutch Bros was founded in Grants Pass in 1992. It based its headquarters in Grants Pass until it moved to Tempe, Arizona, in 2025.

== Arts and culture ==
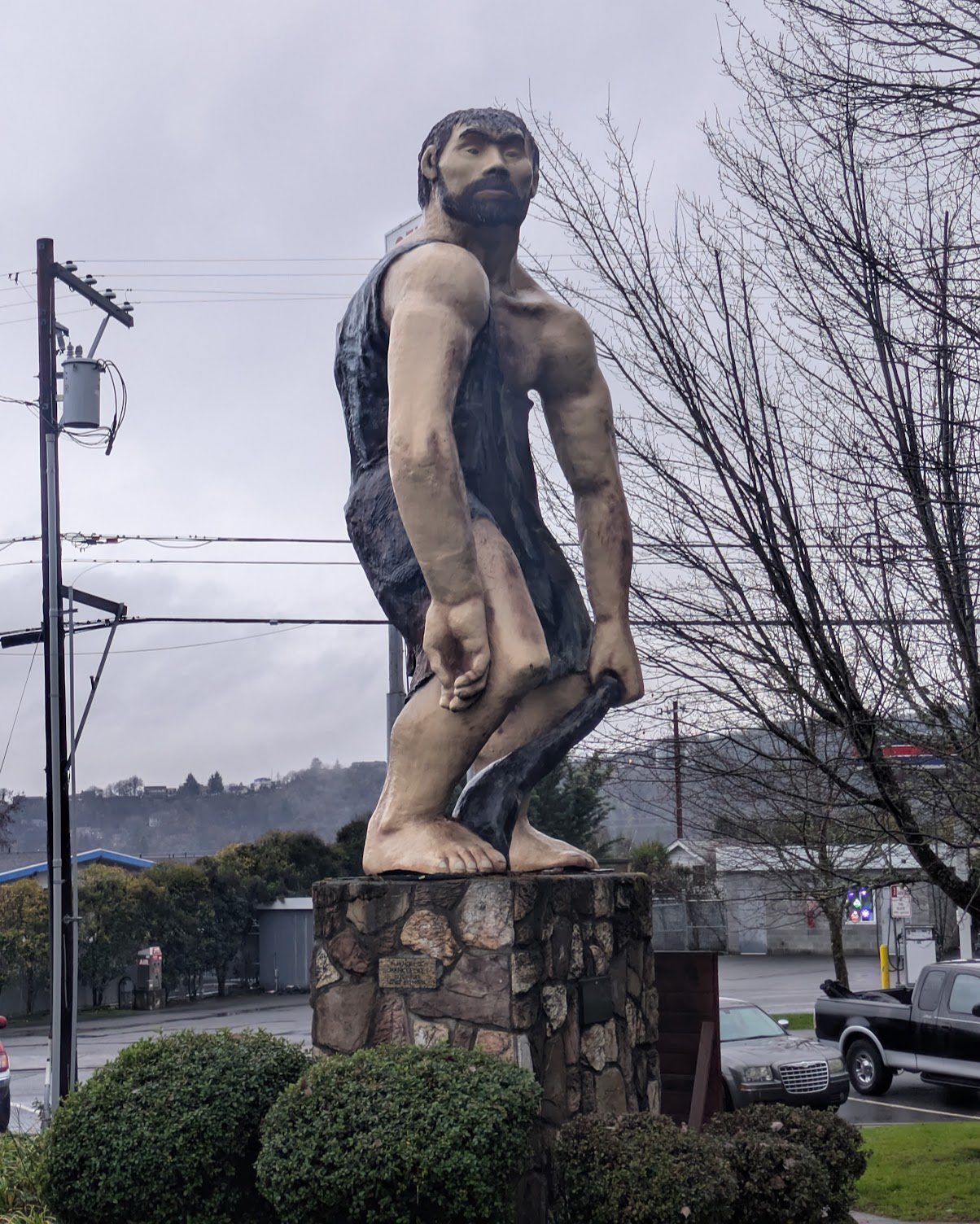
Caveman statue next to the visitor center

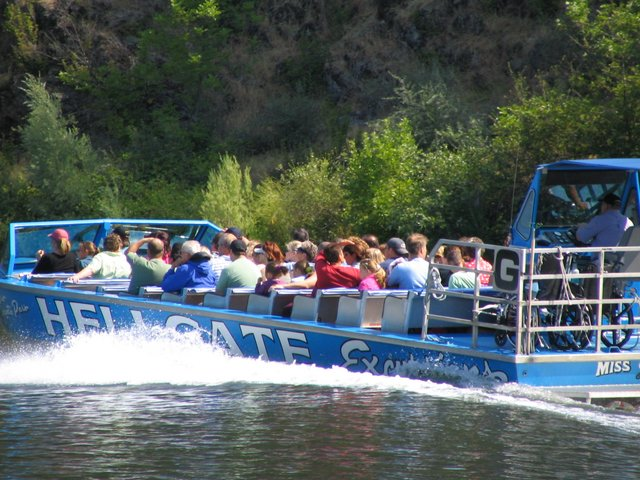
Jetboat on the Rogue River at Grants Pass

=== Annual cultural events ===
Boatnik, a hydroplane boat race and carnival event, is held every Memorial Day weekend in Riverside Park.

They also host the Josephine County Fair which usually occurs in late August.

=== Museums and other points of interest ===
The historic Rogue Theatre downtown has been transformed into a performing arts venue that hosts mostly local acts. The Grants Pass Towne Center Association's "Back to the '50s" Celebration includes free concerts, a nearly 600-vehicle Classic Car Cruise, poker runs, and thematic shopping in the town's downtown historic district.

Year round, there are First Friday Art Nights. On the first Friday of every month, many of the city's downtown stores hold art shows and promotional events.

The Grants Pass post office contains two tempera murals done through the U.S. Treasury Department Section on Fine Arts (often mistakenly referred to as the "WPA"), both painted in 1938. There are ten government-sponsored New Deal era murals in Oregon; Grants Pass is the only post office that contains two. The murals are "Rogue River Indians" by Louis DeMott Bunce (who also painted a 1959 mural at Portland International Airport) and "Early and Contemporary Industries" by Eric Lamade.

The Caveman Bridge on 6th Street was built by Conde McCullough in 1933. The through arch design bridge has been a landmark of Grants Pass for many years, and the bridge was refurbished in 2019. The Redwood Empire sign at the beginning of the bridge has also been a landmark for many years, and it was redone in 2021 due to a car crash.

== Parks and recreation ==
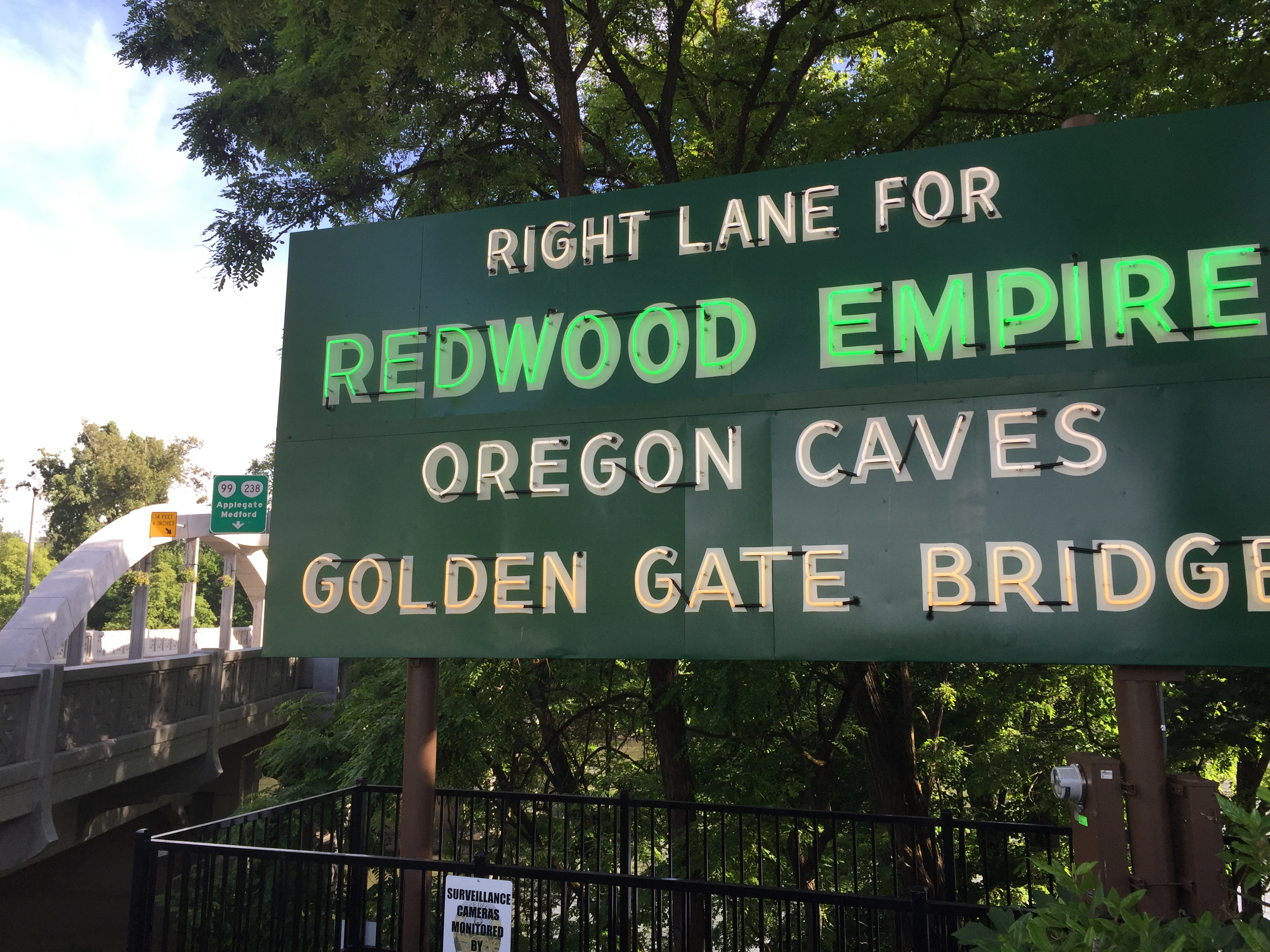
The Redwood Empire sign on 6th Street

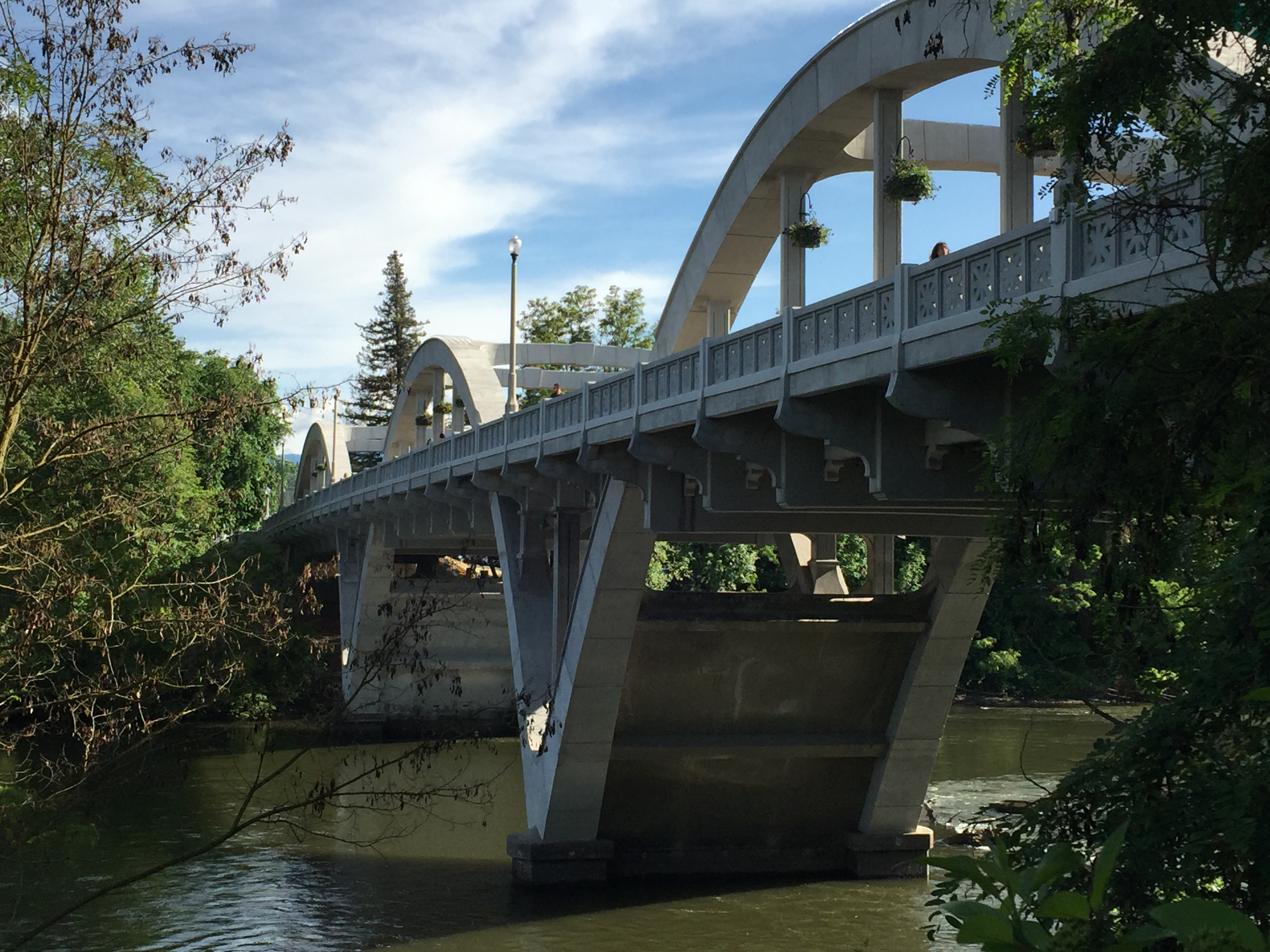
The Caveman Bridge over the Rogue River on 6th Street

Grants Pass has numerous and diverse parks and green spaces. Notable city-run parks include Riverside Park, summer home to the local Concerts in the Park series, and the Reinhart Volunteer Park, a park largely built through the efforts of community volunteers and featuring facilities for many sports. In addition, the Bureau of Land Management maintains the Cathedral Hills Trail System on the outskirts of Grants Pass, which is home to several endangered species of plants, the largest whiteleaf manzanita in the state, as well the tallest knobcone pine. Grants Pass is a Tree City USA Community and has been for 35 years.

The city was involved in litigation before the Supreme Court of the United States in the case of City of Grants Pass v. Johnson, regarding an ordinance preventing homeless people from camping in its parks. On June 28, 2024, in a 6–3 decision, the Court upheld the city's ordinance.

== Education ==
Grants Pass area public schools are served by Grants Pass School District, including Grants Pass High School, and Three Rivers School District, including Illinois Valley High School, North Valley High School, Rivers Edge Academy Charter School, and Hidden Valley High School. Rogue Community College's (RCC) main (Redwood Campus) is located south of Grants Pass on Redwood Highway with additional campuses located in Medford, Oregon (Riverside Campus) and White City (Table Rock Campus).

== Law enforcement ==
The City of Grants Pass is served by individual departments, each with their own respective buildings.

== Media ==
=== Newspapers ===
The Grants Pass Daily Courier is the region's newspaper. It was established in 1885 as the Grant's Pass Courier and then Rogue River Courier. After it became a daily, the name was changed to what it is today.

The other paper of record in Josephine County is the Illinois Valley News in Cave Junction, established in 1937.

=== Radio ===
AM

- KAGI 930 JPR — News and Information
- KAJO 1270 — Classic Hits/News/Talk

FM

(Medford and Ashland stations listed by Grants Pass translator frequencies)

- KDOV 88.1 Religious
- KLXG 91.1 K-LOVE — Religious
- KTMT-FM 92.1 Top 40
- KIFS 93.1 Top 40
- KRRM 94.7 Traditional Country
- KBOY-FM 96.1 Classic Rock
- KROG 96.9 The Rogue — Active Rock
- KLDR 98.3 Top 40
- KRWQ 98.7 Country
- KCMD 99.3 Oldies
- KLDZ 100.7 Classic Hits
- KSOR 101.5 JPR Classical
- KCNA 102.7 The Drive — Classic Hits
- KAWZ 103.1 CSN — Religious
- KAKT 104.7 Country
- KMED 106.3 News/Talk
- KGPZ-LP 106.7 Christian
- KCMX-FM 107.1 Adult Contemporary
- KJCR-LP 107.9 Catholic Talk

== Transportation ==
=== Road ===
- Interstate 5
- U.S. Route 199
- Oregon Route 99
- Oregon Route 238

=== Bus ===
- Josephine Community Transit

=== Rail ===
- Central Oregon and Pacific Railroad

=== Air ===
- Rogue Valley International–Medford Airport
- Grants Pass Airport

== Notable people ==
- David Anders, actor
- Catherine Anderson, writer of historical and contemporary romance novels
- Gordon Sutherland Anderson, mayor and state legislator
- Agnes Baker Pilgrim, chairperson, International Council of Thirteen Indigenous Grandmothers
- Carl Barks, writer and artist
- Ty Burrell, actor
- Terry Carr, science fiction fan, author, editor, and writing instructor
- Helen Chenoweth-Hage, U.S. Representative from Idaho
- Kit Culkin, actor
- Michael Curry, puppet designer
- Elaine Devry, actress
- Brandon Drury, baseball player with the Los Angeles Angels
- David Goines, artist, writer
- Kevin Hagen, actor
- Jack Lee Harelson, archaeological looter
- Mike Johnson, musician, member of Dinosaur Jr., singer-songwriter
- Debbie Lawler, stunt performer
- Charles Levin, actor
- Jim McDonald, baseball player
- Gary McFarland, composer, arranger, vibraphonist and vocalist
- Merrill McPeak, former Chief of Staff of the United States Air Force
- Russell Myers, cartoonist, creator of the comic strip Broom-Hilda
- Scott O'Hara, pornographic actor and poet
- Hub Pernoll, baseball player
- Steve Raines, actor
- Dianne Reum, comics creator.
- Michael Saucedo, actor, musician
- Josh Saunders, soccer goalkeeper
- Shelley Shannon, anti-abortion activist, convicted arsonist and attempted murderer
- Cornelius Sidler, Wisconsin State Assemblyman and lawyer
- Ken Williams, baseball player

=== National Football League (NFL) players ===
- Pat Beach
- Tom Blanchard
- Dick James
- Jerry Sherk
- Don Summers
- Al Wistert

== Sister city ==
- Autlán de Navarro, Mexico.

== See also ==
- Southern Oregon
- Rogue River – Siskiyou National Forest
- Jefferson (proposed Pacific state), proposed state overlapping Oregon and California
