= New Bridge High School =

Location
- 2001 NE F Street; Grants Pass, Josephine County, Oregon 97526; United States; 42.432742°N 123.302372°W

Information
- Type: Public
- Opened
- School district: Grants Pass School District
- Principal: Dave Regal
- Teaching staff: 5.35 (FTE)
- Grades: 9-12
- Enrollment: 27 (2023–2024)
- Student to teacher ratio: 5.05
- Website: New Bridge HS website

New Bridge High School is a public high school in Grants Pass, Oregon, United States. It is located at the Rogue Valley Youth Correctional Facility. New Bridge first started teaching students in December 1997.
