= KGPZ =

KGPZ may refer to:

- KGPZ-LP, a low-power radio station (106.7 FM) licensed to serve Grants Pass, Oregon, United States
- WDKE (FM), a radio station (96.1 FM) licensed to serve Coleraine, Minnesota, United States, which held the call sign KGPZ from 1995 to 2017
- Grand Rapids–Itasca County Airport (ICAO code KGPZ)
