= KAJO =

- Grants Pass, Oregon; United States
- Broadcast area: Southern Oregon
- Frequency: 1270 kHz
- Branding: KAJO AM 1270 & 99.7 FM

Programming
- Format: AC/Classic Hits/News/Talk
- Affiliations: Fox News Radio

Ownership
- Owner: Grants Pass Broadcasting Corporation
- Sister stations: KLDR, KRRM

History
- First air date: August 15, 1957

Technical information
- Licensing authority: FCC
- Facility ID: 24822
- Class: D
- Power: 10,000 watts day 48 watts night
- Transmitter coordinates: 42°26′16″N 123°21′27″W
- Translator: 99.7 K259AE (Williams)

Links
- Public license information: Public file; LMS
- Webcast: Listen Live
- Website: www.kajo.com

KAJO (1270 AM, "KAJO AM 1270 & 99.7 FM") is a commercial AC/classic hits and news/talk radio station in Grants Pass, Oregon, broadcasting to the Southern Oregon area. It was owned by Carl Wilson's Grants Pass Broadcasting Corporation. In 2024, Grants Pass Broadcasting was sold to Brian and Shanna Diatte.

== History ==
The Grants Pass Broadcasting Corporation, a partnership of James O. "Jim" Wilson Jr. and Jim T. Jackson, applied for a construction permit to build a new 1,000-watt, daytime-only radio station in Grants Pass on October 1, 1956; the Federal Communications Commission (FCC) granted the application on May 1, 1957. Wilson had been encouraged to become a station owner while selling ad time on a station in Klamath Falls; a national appliance salesman told him to move to Grants Pass, which at the time only had one station. A third partner, Phil Jackson, was added to the ownership group in 1958, and the station increased its daytime power to 5,000 watts in 1960. The Jacksons would remain part-owners until 1973, when Wilson bought them out and made Elzie Parker, a longtime friend, the only other partner in the business.

In the 1980s, Jim Wilson's son Carl Wilson and his brother Matt became involved in the management of the station. Grants Pass Broadcasting also expanded in 1993 by starting KLDR (98.3 FM). Carl Wilson became a state legislator from 1999 to 2003; he left the legislature citing its dysfunction, noting that there were five special sessions in 2002, and returned to focus on KAJO, where he hosts a talk show. When Wilson returned to the legislature, he stopped hosting his show during election season to avoid a conflict of interest, though he continued to purchase campaign advertising to air on his own stations.

Grants Pass Broadcasting acquired KRRM (94.7 FM), then off the air, in 2020, giving it a third station in the area.

== Translator ==
KAJO also broadcasts on the following FM translator: this improves the coverage and provides high fidelity stereo sound.

Broadcast translator for KAJO
Call sign	Frequency	City of license	FID	ERP (W)	Class	FCC info
K259AE	99.7 FM	Williams, Oregon	24827	250	D	LMS
