= Grants Pass High School =

Public school in Grants Pass, Oregon, United States

Location
- 830 NE 9th Street; Grants Pass, (Josephine County), Oregon 97526; United States; 42.444488°N 123.317663°W

Information
- Type: Public
- Opened: 1885
- School district: Grants Pass School District
- Principal: Jason Garcia
- Staff: 81.76 (on an FTE basis)
- Grades: 9-12
- Enrollment: 1,657 (2023–2024)
- Student to teacher ratio: 20.27
- Colors: Royal blue and white
- Athletics conference: OSAA Southwest Conference 6A-6
- Mascot: Caveman
- Rival: North Medford High School and South Medford High School
- Newspaper: The Scroll
- Website: Grants Pass High School

Grants Pass High School is a public high school located in Grants Pass, Oregon, United States. The school colors are blue and white, and the mascot is the Caveman. The mascot is a reference to the Oregon Caves National Monument, which is an important tourist attraction in nearby Cave Junction, Oregon.

== History ==
Grants Pass High School was originally built in 1885, in a wooden building located at Fourth and C Streets. The first graduating class was in 1888. Around 1911 a new building was built at the center of the present campus on Olive Street, between 8th and 9th Streets. In 1939, North Junior High School was built next door. Various other additions to the campus occurred between 1948 and 1969, including expansions to the central building as well as numerous satellite buildings. When North Junior High School was relocated, its old campus became the English Building. In 1988, a fire destroyed the grandstands on Mel-Ingram Field and damaged the large gym. The grandstands were replaced in 1989 on the west side of the field.

In 1998, the entire campus was demolished and re-constructed. The facility is now a state-of-the-art high school, complete with a performing arts center which is also used as a convention center and theater for the community. In addition to the performing arts center, the campus also consists of a main building (housing the library, front office, counseling office, and career center), the commons (housing the cafeteria), the arts/science building, the vocational/technical building, and Heater/Newman Memorial Gymnasium. The gymnasium features 'pit' style seating and contains an indoor running track.

The campus is spread over approximately 47 acres (190,000 m^{2}) of land in downtown Grants Pass; the new facility was constructed to house approximately 1800 students.

== Academics ==
In 2008, 81% of the school's seniors received a high school diploma. Of 448 students, 363 graduated, 49 dropped out, five received a modified diploma, and 31 were still in high school in 2009. In 2017, 72% of the school's seniors received a high school diploma, 5% lower than the state average of 77%.

Grants Pass High School Absentee Rates for 2016-2017 school year.

In 2017 the school had higher absentee rates, across all grades, than the state average.

Grants Pass High School offers 17 Advanced Placement (AP) classes and opportunities for college credit through Rogue Community College and Southern Oregon University.

== Athletics ==
Grants Pass High School is a Southwest Conference 6A-6 OSAA High School. Teams include football, cross country, volleyball, equestrian, swimming, skiing, basketball, wrestling, soccer, bowling, baseball, golf, softball and tennis. Traditionally, Grants Pass excels in wrestling and volleyball. The swim team has placed first at the 6A district meet, and has consistently sent swimmers to the state championship.

In December 1948, the Cavemen won the state football championship after defeating Jefferson High School 6-0. During the return trip, the chartered bus transporting the team went off the side of the road, resulting in the deaths of two athletes: Sterling Heater and Al Newman. Because the trophy was badly damaged during the accident, the OSAA offered to replace it with a new trophy in exchange for the old, damaged one. However, the team refused to give up the trophy, and the OSAA eventually allowed the school to keep both trophies.

In the 2014 football season, the Cavemen went 9-0 during the regular season en route to becoming the undefeated SW Conference Champions. During that season, the Cavemen put up over 50 points on four occasions, over 70 points twice during the regular season, and over 70 once again in the playoffs. The season ended with a loss in the third round of the playoffs to West Salem.

Grants Pass High School partners with the Grants Pass chapter of Rotary International to host an annual track and field invitational. It is the last invitational meet in the state. Roughly 700 athletes from at least 30 schools across Oregon and Northern California compete in the event annually. The competition is restricted to the top 16 athletes in each event. The meet includes a military flyover provided by the 173rd Fighter Wing.

=== State championships ===
- Football: 1948, 1951, 1964, 1967
- Boys basketball: 1962
- Wrestling: 1962, 1963, 1964
- Cheerleading: 1986
- Softball: 2008, 2010
- Boys track and field: 1947, 2015

== Extracurricular activities ==
Grants Pass High School offers many extracurricular clubs and programs, including Academic Masters, Brain Bowl, Choir, Leadership, Marching Band and Color Guard, Math Team, Music Honor Society, Mock Trial, National Honor Society, Orchestra, SkillsUSA, State of Jefferson Scavenger Hunt, and Theatre.

The school's Mock Trial team qualified for and competed in the state Mock Trial competition at the Portland Mark O. Hatfield courthouse. In 2020, along with the team placing first, one of the team members was awarded the first ever ranked attorney award at regionals for highest scoring participant.

The school's Brain Bowl team has held the title of Division A champions for two consecutive years.

The school also offers a wide variety of clubs, including Anime Club, Dungeons & Dragons Club, Environmental Action Club, Future Business Leaders of America, International Club, History Club, Future Health Professionals, Interact Club, Key Club, Minority Education Challenge Adversity, Mock Trial, Native American Student Union, Origami Club, Robotics Engineering Club, Southern Oregon Pride, Speech and Debate, Yearbook Club, Young Life Club, and Z Club.

=== Marching Band ===
The school's marching band was named the 2010 NWAPA circuit champions for their production "Traffic". The Marching Band and Auxiliary performed in the 2010 Macy's Thanksgiving Day Parade by invitation on November 25, 2010. In 2018, they were named the NWAPA circuit champions with their production "One Step Closer." The Marching Band and Guard were invited to perform in the 2018 Macy's Thanksgiving Day Parade. The band would go on to win the NWAPA circuit championship in 2019 with their show "Over Under", in 2021 with "World of Our Creation", in 2022 with "Valkyrie", in 2023 with "Luminous", in 2024 with "Wild Style" and most recently in 2025 with "A Swan's Song". The Band is currently under the direction of Lewis Norfleet and Noreen Norfleet.

== Speech Controversy and Later Settlement ==
In April 2021, Grants Pass School District 7 placed North Middle School assistant principal Rachel Damiano (later known as Rachel Sager) and science and health teacher Katie Medart on paid administrative leave following controversy over their involvement in the "I Resolve" movement which gave an alternative policy template recommendation concerning gender identity, pronoun use and private spaces in education. The district subsequently terminated both educators in July 2021, citing violations of district policies. The educators disputed the district's characterization of their activities and challenged the termination.

Damiano and Medart filed a federal lawsuit against the district and individual district officials in June 2021, alleging violations of their rights under the First and Fourteenth Amendments to the United States Constitution, Title VII of the Civil Rights Act of 1964, and the Oregon Constitution. Their claims included First amendment retaliation, viewpoint discrimination, equal protection violations, and religious discrimination. In November 2021, the school board reversed their earlier decision and reinstated both educators. Following their reinstatement, both were reassigned to positions at the district's online school.

In June 2025, The United States Court of Appeals for the Ninth Circuit issued its decision in Damiano v. Grants Pass School District 7. The court affirmed portions of the lower court's decision but vacated summary judgement on several claims and remanded them for further proceedings. These included claims involving First Amendment retaliation, viewpoint discrimination, equal protection, and religious discrimination under Title VII. The Ninth Circuit found that factual disputes remained concerning the district's reasons for terminating the educators and whether those reasons were sufficient to justify the employment decisions. The appellate court did not enter a final judgement establishing whether the district had violated the educators' rights or not.

In November 2025, Grants Pass School District 7 reached a negotiated settlement with Damiano (Sager) and Medart, resolving the federal lawsuit. The agreement provided for a total payment of $650,00, including damages and attorneys' fees. Other reported terms included positive letters of recommendation for both educators, removal of negative references from their personnel files, a public statement by the district acknowledging that its handling of the matter had fallen short of its standards and responsibilities, and revisions to district policies concerning employee speech and religious freedom. The settlement also required Medart to resign her position in the District and neither educator is permitted to be an employee of the district in perpetuity.

In public statements concerning the settlement, the district also stated that neither educator had been found to have committed professional misconduct and both had been cleared of any professional wrongdoing by the Oregon Teacher Standards and Practices Commission.

== Notable people ==
=== Alumni ===
- David Anders — actor (aka David Holt)
- Ethen Beavers — comic book artist
- Tom Blanchard — former professional football player
- Brandon Drury — professional baseball player
- Willie Heston - American football player and coach
- Bob "Hardcore Holly" Howard — professional wrestler
- Merrill McPeak — 14th Chief of Staff of the United States Air Force
- Jerry Sherk — NFL player

=== Faculty ===
- John Tully — former coach
