= XHSILL-FM =

Community radio station in Hermosillo, Sonora, Mexico

- Hermosillo, Sonora; Mexico
- Frequency: 106.7 FM
- Branding: Política y Rock'n'roll Radio

Ownership
- Owner: Autogestión Comunicativa, A.C.

History
- First air date: February 19, 2016 (social community concession)
- Call sign meaning: HermoSILLo

Technical information
- Licensing authority: CRT
- Class: A
- ERP: 3 kW
- HAAT: −7.8 m (−26 ft)
- Transmitter coordinates: 29°05′39.2″N 110°57′43.6″W

XHSILL-FM is a community radio station on 106.7 FM in Hermosillo, Sonora, known as Política y Rock'n'roll Radio.

== History ==
Política y Rock'n'roll Radio originated from a program that ran on XHCD-FM 95.5 until 2011 and began operations as an unlicensed station on 97.7 MHz in June 2012. On March 25, 2014, the station's equipment was confiscated.

In order to broadcast legally, the operators of the station formed a civil association, Autogestión Comunicativa, A.C., and began working to obtain a permit. However, the Federal Broadcasting and Telecommunications Law, promulgated in July 2014, replaced permits with two types of concessions: public use, for stations owned by local, state and federal governments and public universities, and social use, for all other noncommercial stations. Two further subdivisions were established in the social use category, community and indigenous.

When Autogestión Comunicativa was awarded its social community concession by the IFT in November 2015, it was the first time that such a concession had been awarded, enshrining community radio stations in Mexican law; the concession was received in February 2016. The new station, broadcasting as XHSILL-FM on 106.7 MHz, was also the first social station assigned to the new reserved band (106-108 MHz) set aside for broadcasters of this type.

While it was the first new social community radio station (with a federal concession) on air, with testing beginning in July 2016, XHSILL was not the first social community radio station to operate. In April 2016, the IFT transitioned the existing permit of XEYTM-AM, an operating radio station in Teocelo, Veracruz, to a social community concession.
