= KQTY (AM) =

- Borger, Texas; United States
- Frequency: 1490 kHz

Programming
- Format: Defunct (formerly Talk radio)
- Affiliations: CBS Radio, Radio America, Talk Radio Network, Westwood One

Ownership
- Owner: Zia Broadcasting Company
- Sister stations: KQTY-FM

History
- Former call signs: KRGH (1946); KHUZ (1946–1972)

Technical information
- Facility ID: 74564
- Class: C
- Power: 1,000 watts
- Transmitter coordinates: 35°41′5.20″N 101°23′21.60″W

KQTY (1490 AM) was a radio station broadcasting a talk radio format. Licensed to Borger, Texas, United States, the station was last owned by Zia Broadcasting Company. The station featured hourly newscasts from CBS Radio. Show hosts included Doug Stephan, Hugh Hewitt, Dennis Prager, Dana Loesch and Michael Medved.

On August 12, 2019, station management announced that the station would cease operation on Friday, August 16, 2019, at 10 pm. The station's license was surrendered to the Federal Communications Commission and was cancelled on September 15, 2020.
