= Gary Leif =

American politician and businessman (1956–2021)

Member of the Oregon House of Representatives from the 2nd district
- In office May 9, 2018 – July 22, 2021
- Preceded by: Dallas Heard
- Succeeded by: Christine Goodwin

Personal details
- Born: November 27, 1956
- Died: July 22, 2021 (aged 64) Roseburg, Oregon, U.S.
- Party: Republican
- Spouse: Carol

Gary Leif (November 27, 1956 – July 22, 2021) was an American politician and businessman serving as a Republican member of the Oregon House of Representatives. He represented the 2nd district.

== Early life and education ==
Leif was raised in Douglas County, Oregon. He attended Umpqua Community College; the Brooks Institute for Photography; and the University of California, Santa Barbara, but did not earn a degree.

== Career ==
For over four decades, Leif owned a photography studio in Roseburg. He was elected to the Douglas County Commission in 2016.

Following the resignation of Representative Dallas Heard who was appointed to take a seat in the Oregon Senate, Leif was appointed to the state House of Representatives on April 30, 2018, and sworn in on May 9, 2018. He had previously announced his bid for the seat in March 2018.

On December 11, 2020, Leif and 11 other state Republican officials signed a letter requesting Oregon Attorney General Ellen Rosenblum join Texas and other states contesting the results of the 2020 presidential election in Texas v. Pennsylvania. Rosenblum announced she had filed on behalf of the defense, and against Texas, the day prior.

=== Political positions ===
Leif was anti-abortion. He opposed sanctuary cities and favored sending Oregon National Guard troops to the Mexico–United States border. Leif advocated for Eastern Oregon to be incorporated as a part of Idaho. Leif joined other Douglas County politicians in opposition to the local group, Citizens Against Tyranny, although his predecessor, Heard, had co-founded the group. Heard said the group's posting of a list of names of whistleblowers who had complained about the failure of local businesses to abide by restrictions that had been imposed by Oregon Governor Kate Brown to help control the COVID-19 pandemic in 2010, should not have been publicized.

== Death ==
Leif formerly resided in Winston, Oregon. He died of cancer on July 22, 2021.

== Electoral history ==
2018 Oregon State Representative, 2nd district
Party	Candidate	Votes	%
Republican	Gary Leif	17,104	66.1
Democratic	Megan Salter	8,700	33.6
Write-in		69	0.3
Total votes		25,873	100%

2020 Oregon State Representative, 2nd district
Party	Candidate	Votes	%
Republican	Gary Leif	24,341	71.6
Democratic	Charles F Lee	9,546	28.1
Write-in		101	0.3
Total votes		33,988	100%
