= KYBG =

Coordinates: 30.087°N 92.382°W

- Basile, Louisiana; United States
- Broadcast area: Lafayette metropolitan area, Lake Charles
- Frequency: 102.1 MHz
- Branding: Big 102.1

Programming
- Language: English
- Format: Classic hits

Ownership
- Owner: Third Partner Broadcasting
- Sister stations: KSIG; KWLL-FM

History
- First air date: April 27, 1989 (as KBAZ)
- Former call signs: KBAZ (1989–1994); KSIG-FM (1994–1997); KQIS (1997–2010)

Technical information
- Licensing authority: FCC
- Facility ID: 66791
- Class: C1
- ERP: 100,000 watts
- HAAT: 299 meters (981 ft)

Links
- Public license information: Public file; LMS
- Webcast: Listen live
- Website: www.big1021.com

KYBG (102.1 FM) is a classic hits formatted radio station owned by Third Partner Broadcasting and serving the Lafayette and Lake Charles areas. Its studios are in Crowley and its transmitter is located northwest of Kaplan in Acadia Parish.

== History ==
The station signed on in 1989 as Acadia Parish-focused KBAZ with a country format. In 1994, 102.1 changed calls to KSIG-FM and became a simulcast of adult standards sister station KSIG, which lasted until April 10, 1997, when the signal was upgraded to 50 kW and entered the Lafayette market. Upon the upgrade, the station took on the KQIS call letters and switched to adult contemporary as "Kiss 102".

Since the initial upgrade into the Lafayette market, KQIS has shifted its format several times. In 1998, KQIS had to drop the "KISS" branding (due to copyright infringement and a threatened lawsuit by Clear Channel). The station was not sued and had to be renamed as Soft Rock 102.1, whilst sticking to the same adult contemporary format. Later that year, 102.1 was upgraded once more to 100 kW, extending coverage west to Lake Charles market and became a hybrid adult contemporary-smooth jazz "102.1 Kiss FM", which further popularized the station. In October 2000, KQIS became one of the first stations in the United States to launch an 1980s oldies format, which lasted until late 2001, when newer music was mixed in to shift the station's format to hot adult contemporary.

In 2002, the Kiss brand was dropped once and for all when what is now KOBW became Kiss FM. KOBW provided fringe coverage into the Lafayette area at the time, and KQIS' owners feared a cease and desist from Clear Channel, who owns KOBW. The hot AC format was tweaked to Top 40 for a short time in 2004 before settling on the current format.

On March 11, 2010, KQIS changed their call letters to KYBG. It now calls itself "BIG 102.1" and plays what it calls "the biggest hits" from the 1980s and 1990s with some from the 1970s and early 2000s also mixed in.

== Previous logos ==
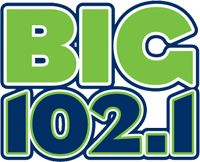
