= Dianne Reum =

Lesbian comics creator

Dianne Reum is a self-taught, lesbian comics creator. Reum created the comic series "Tomboy," as well as other stand-alone works. Her work was serialized in Canada's Oh... and Portland's Bluestocking, but she was also featured in many other periodicals and collections.

== Biography ==
Reum grew up in Grants Pass, Oregon. She started drawing cartoons in junior high, but began seriously focusing on her art after seeing her mother's success in selling paintings. She worked jobs at restaurants and grocery stores before she began freelancing in 1990.

== Tomboy ==
"Tomboy" is a comics series that follows a young tomboy through various childhood scenarios, such as crushes, receiving unwanted Christmas gifts, and having to wear feminine clothing. "Tomboy" was initially created as a response to a newspaper request for submissions for a women's humor anthology. Reum uses her Tomboy character to represent experiences from her own childhood, illustrating the torment young tomboys face.

"Tomboy," was serialized in Oh.... "Tomboy" appeared in issues 2 and 3 alongside work from Joan Hilty, with features in issues 6 and 7. Issue 9 of Oh... is solely dedicated to "Tomboy." Reum completed a collaborative piece with Hope Barrett for issue 11, titled "Tomboy Takes to the Street."

In addition to its serialization, strips from "Tomboy" were selected to be in a variety of anthologies, including several put together by Roz Warren.

== Other works ==
Reum's stand-alone comics were mainly featured in female-oriented collections and books. She created work covering various women's issues, such as domestic violence, sexual harassment, and reproductive rights. Reum also created comedy focused works, such as those in Kitty Libber and Weenie-Toons.

== Contributions ==
- Silverleaf's Choice (1990)
- Oh... (1993-1995)
- Bluestocking
- Lesbian Contradiction (1992)
- Hera (1995)
- Tomboys!: Tales of Dyke Derring-Do (1995)
- LRC News: The Lesbian Resource Center's Community Voice
- Dyke Strippers: Lesbian Cartoonists A to Z (1995)
- Women's Glibber
- What Is This Thing Called Sex?: Cartoons by Women (1993)
- Eat, Drink and Remarry: What Women Really Think about Divorce (2000)
- Playgirl
- MS
- Mothers!: Cartoons by Women (1993)
- Weenie-Toons (1992)
- The Best Women's Contemporary Humor
- Kitty Libber: Cat Cartoons by Women (1992)
- The National Abortion Campaign Comic Book
- Sexual Harassment: Women Speak Out (1992)
- Get It: A Five Minute Guide for Men Who Don't
