= Jerry Sherk =

American football player (born 1948)

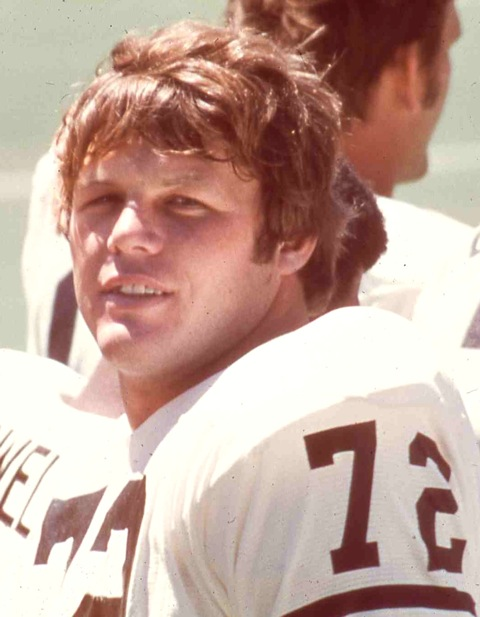
- Sherk during a Cleveland Browns game circa 1972

No. 72
- Position: Defensive tackle

Personal information
- Born: July 7, 1948 (age 78); Grants Pass, Oregon, U.S.
- Listed height: 6 ft 4 in (1.93 m)
- Listed weight: 258 lb (117 kg)

Career information
- High school: Grants Pass
- College: Oklahoma State
- NFL draft: 1970: 2nd round, 47th overall pick

Career history
- Cleveland Browns (1970–1981)

Awards and highlights
- NFL Defensive Player of the Year (NEA) (1976); First-team All-Pro (1976); 4× Pro Bowl (1973–1976); Cleveland Browns Legends; First-team All-Big Eight (1969)

Career NFL statistics
- Games played: 147
- Fumbles recovered: 12
- Stats at Pro Football Reference

Jerry Martin Sherk (born July 7, 1948) is an American former professional football player who was a defensive tackle for the Cleveland Browns of the National Football League (NFL) for 12 seasons between 1970 until 1981. He made the Pro Bowl lineup for four straight years from 1973 through 1976, and is widely considered to be among the best defensive players in Cleveland Browns history.

== College career ==
Jerry Sherk was born in Grants Pass, Oregon. He attended Grants Pass High, where he joined the school's wrestling and football teams.

Sherk attended Grays Harbor College in Aberdeen, Washington and Oklahoma State University in Stillwater, Oklahoma. During high school, he played on both the football and wrestling teams in both his junior and senior years. He was an All-Big Eight selection on the gridiron in 1969 and an All-American as a Cowboy grappler in 1969. He was inducted to the Oklahoma State Hall of Honor in 2000. He was the key to the Grays Harbor wrestling team winning state two consecutive seasons. Individually, he also won back-to-back state titles and in 1968, he pinned every opponent he faced.

== Professional career ==
Sherk was selected in the second round (47th overall) of the 1970 NFL draft by the Cleveland Browns. His first game was on September 21, 1970, the first regular edition of Monday Night Football. He became a starting player immediately, and soon became noted as having a knack for getting to the quarterback. Sherk was part of an AFC Central Division in which each team boasted All-Pro quality defensive tackles: the Pittsburgh Steelers' Joe Greene, the Cincinnati Bengals' Mike Reid, and the Houston Oilers' Curley Culp, with Greene and Culp earning enshrinement in the Pro Football Hall of Fame.

He was part of a 1972 Browns team that went 10-4 and advanced to the playoffs, losing to the undefeated Miami Dolphins. Sherk led the Browns in sacks with 10½ sacks and led teams' defensive linemen in tackles with 91, after totaling three sacks and 83 tackles in 1970 and 84 tackles with 4 1/2 sacks in 1971. The following year Sherk played in his first Pro Bowl after sacking opposing quarterbacks 5½ times and making 100 tackles, most by any Browns defensive lineman that season. In 1974 Sherk made his second Pro Bowl and led the Browns with 10 sacks to go with his 94 tackles.

In 1975 Sherk made his third consecutive Pro Bowl and was named All-AFC. He is known for punching St. Louis Cardinals QB, Jim Hart, in they eye during the Pro Bowl game causing him to leave the game with six stitches above his eye. According to Hart he did not apologize. He matched his own career-high of 100 tackles and recorded six sacks. In 1976 Sherk recorded 12 sacks and 92 tackles and was voted the NFL Defensive Player of the Year by the Newspaper Enterprise Association (NEA). Sherk was a consensus All-Pro, making the AP, PFWA, NEA teams as well as being consensus All-AFC for the second consecutive year. November 14, 1976 he set club record with four sacks in one game. He capped the season off by playing in his fourth consecutive Pro Bowl.

At a September 1977 preseason match against the Green Bay Packers, Sherk seriously injured his knee. Consequently, he was only able to play in seven games during the 1977 season. He came back in 1978 recording a new career-high in tackles with 105 but only dropped opposing quarterbacks 3 times.

During a November 4, 1979 game at Veterans Stadium in Philadelphia, an infected boil on Sherk's arm was scraped off. Bacteria from the field's Astroturf entered his body through the wound, triggering a staph infection that traveled to his knee and nearly killed him. Sherk missed the last six games of the 1979 season. His substitute on the field was Henry Bradley. The infection eventually proved to be more problematic than first imagined, and effectively sidelined him for the 1980 season, in which he played in only one game and recorded only one tackle. Sherk's absence prompted the Browns to go to the 3-4 defense in 1980, with Bradley at nose guard.

He spent his final season, 1981, as a designated pass rusher, coming in to play defensive tackle when the Browns switched from the 3-4 to a four down lineman nickel defense. In that limited role he recorded 12 tackles and three sacks. In all, Sherk totaled 864 career tackles and 69½ sacks. Along the way, blocked 6 kicks, intercepted three passes, and recovered ten fumbles.

== Post NFL career ==
=== Photography ===
After leaving football, Sherk worked as a sports photographer for roughly ten years. His work was featured in Sports Illustrated, Pro! Magazine, and many newspapers. His photographs from this time period were featured in an exhibition titled Through the Eyes of a Defensive Lineman: The Cleveland Browns as Photographed by Jerry Sherk. The photo show was held December 14, 2010 at Baldwin Wallace College in Berea, Ohio, and was sponsored by the Cleveland Touchdown Club Charities.

=== Mentoring ===
In 1991 Sherk returned to college, earning a master's degree in counseling psychology. He began counseling various vulnerable populations, becoming especially interested in working with at-risk children. Along the way he created a school-based group mentoring program that uses sports to teach young people how to reach goals in academics and life.

== Personal life ==
Sherk resides in Encinitas, California in San Diego county, with his wife Ann.
