= XHEPQ-FM =

Radio station in Melchor Múzquiz-Palaú, Coahuila

- La Loma, Coahuila; Mexico
- Broadcast area: Nueva Rosita
- Frequency: 106.7 MHz
- Branding: La Sabrosita

Programming
- Format: Grupera

Ownership
- Owner: Grupo M; (Organización Radiofónica del Norte, S.A. de C.V.)

History
- First air date: December 2, 1963 (concession)

Technical information
- Licensing authority: CRT
- Class: B1
- ERP: 15 kW
- HAAT: 23.64 m (77.6 ft)
- Transmitter coordinates: 27°52′31.6″N 101°28′15.6″W

Links
- Website: www.gemradio.com.mx/lasabrosita/

XHEPQ-FM is a radio station on 106.7 FM serving the Región Carbonífera of north-central Coahuila. It is owned by Grupo M and is known as La Sabrosita with a grupera format.

== History ==
XEPQ-AM received its concession on December 2, 1963. Owned by Luis Isaac Elias, XEPQ broadcast from Múzquiz on 1250 kHz. Within several years, XEPQ had moved to 710. It broadcast with 1,000 watts day and 100 watts night. In 1994, Organización Radiofónica del Norte bought the station.

In 2003, XEPQ moved to 730 kHz with 5,000 watts day and 1,000 watts at night.

XEPQ moved to FM in 2011.
