= KZJZ (FM) =

Radio station in Babbitt–Ely, Minnesota

- Babbitt, Minnesota; United States
- Broadcast area: Ely, Minnesota
- Frequency: 106.7 MHz
- Branding: Real Presence Radio

Programming
- Format: Catholic talk radio
- Network: Real Presence Radio

Ownership
- Owner: Real Presence Radio

History
- First air date: 1998; 28 years ago
- Former call signs: KAOD (1998–2017)

Technical information
- Licensing authority: FCC
- Facility ID: 18530
- Class: C2
- ERP: 19,000 watts
- HAAT: 131 meters
- Transmitter coordinates: 47°41′18″N 91°54′21″W
- Translator: 105.5 W288AI (Ely)

Links
- Public license information: Public file; LMS
- Website: yourcatholicradiostation.com

KZJZ is an FM radio station on 106.7 MHz licensed to Babbitt, Minnesota. KZJZ is owned by Real Presence Radio.

== History ==
As KAOD, 106.7 FM in Babbitt, along with WXXZ (95.3 FM) in Grand Marais, formerly simulcast KQDS-FM from Duluth. In 2017, Midwest Communications sold W288AI (105.5 FM, Ely), WXXZ, and KAOD to Aurora Broadcasting, finding that the rural stations did not fit their business.

In 2017, KAOD and WXXZ both changed their callsigns. KAOD changed its callsign to KZJZ, and WXXZ changed its callsign to WVVE.

In May 2018, after stunting, KZJZ and WVVE launched an adult album alternative format branded as "Radio North Of Ordinary". It was the first full-time AAA format in the region.

In December 2018, Aurora Broadcasting announced that they would sell KZJZ and FM translator W288AI to Real Presence Radio. The sale was consummated on April 30, 2019.
