= Three Rivers School District (Oregon) =

School district in Oregon, United States

Three Rivers School District is a public school district that serves the Illinois Valley, Hidden Valley and North Valley regions of Jackson and Josephine counties in the U.S. state of Oregon, including parts of the city of Grants Pass, the city of Cave Junction, and the communities of Applegate, Williams and Wolf Creek.

== History ==
The school district was formed when the Josephine County School District combined with the Applegate School District in 1994. The name refers to the Applegate, Illinois, and Rogue rivers.

== Demographics ==
In the 2009 school year, the district had 298 students classified as homeless by the Department of Education, or 5.5% of students in the district.

== Schools ==
=== Hidden Valley Region ===
- Applegate School (K-8)
- Fruitdale Elementary School
- Madrona Elementary School
- Williams Elementary School
- Lincoln Savage Middle School
- Hidden Valley High School

=== North Valley Region ===
- Fort Vannoy Elementary School
- Manzanita Elementary School
- Fleming Middle School
- North Valley High School
- Southern Oregon Success Academy

=== Illinois Valley Region ===
- Evergreen Elementary School
- Lorna Byrne Middle School
- Illinois Valley High School

=== Charter Schools ===
- Kalmiopsis Community Arts High School (Illinois Valley Region)
- Woodland Charter School (Hidden Valley Region)
- Sunny Wolf Charter School (North Valley Region)

== See also ==
- Grants Pass School District
