= XHQH-FM =

- Ixmiquilpan, Hidalgo; Mexico
- Frequency: 106.7 MHz
- Branding: La Ke Buena

Programming
- Format: Regional Mexican
- Affiliations: Radiópolis

Ownership
- Owner: Radio Milenium Orbital, S.A. de C.V.

History
- First air date: October 15, 1985 (concession)

Technical information
- ERP: 6,000 watts
- Transmitter coordinates: 20°30′27.97″N 99°12′33.45″W

Links
- Webcast: Listen live
- Website: kebuenahidalgo.com.mx

XHQH-FM is a radio station in Ixmiquilpan, Hidalgo broadcasting on 106.7 FM. It carries the La Ke Buena Regional Mexican format from Radiópolis.

== History ==
XEQH-AM 1270 received its concession on October 15, 1985. It was owned by Miguel Galindo Amador. Milenium Orbital acquired it in 2004 and raised its power from 1 kW to 3.

It was moved to FM after being cleared in 2012.
