= KRRM =

- Rogue River, Oregon; United States
- Broadcast area: Medford-Ashland, Oregon
- Frequency: 94.7 MHz
- Branding: 94.7 K-Double-R-M

Programming
- Format: Country
- Affiliations: Fox News Radio; Compass Media Networks; United Stations Radio Networks; Westwood One

Ownership
- Owner: Carl Wilson and Sarah Williams; (Grants Pass Broadcasting Corp)
- Sister stations: KAJO, KLDR

History
- First air date: 1994
- Call sign meaning: CReaM (former slogan)

Technical information
- Licensing authority: FCC
- Facility ID: 60215
- Class: A
- ERP: 130 watts
- HAAT: 623 meters (2,044 ft)
- Transmitter coordinates: 42°26′44″N 123°12′56″W

Links
- Public license information: Public file; LMS
- Webcast: Listen Live
- Website: krrm.com

KRRM (94.7 FM) is a radio station broadcasting a gold-based country music format. Licensed to Rogue River, Oregon, United States, the station serves the Medford-Ashland area. The station is owned by Carl Wilson and Sarah Williams, through licensee Grants Pass Broadcasting Corp.

On January 4, 2021, KRRM returned to the air with country music ranging from the 70s through today.
