= Grants Pass School District =

School district in Oregon, United States

Grants Pass School District 7

Location
- Grants Pass, Oregon United States

District information
- Type: Public
- Motto: We will provide an education that encourages all students to reach their potential and to become responsible, productive citizens.
- Grades: K-12
- Superintendent: Tim Sweeney
- Chair of the board: Cassie Wilkins
- Schools: 12

Students and staff
- Enrollment: 5700
- Teachers: 340
- Staff: 900

Other information
- Website: www.grantspass.k12.or.us

Grants Pass School District 7 is a public school district that serves the city of Grants Pass, Oregon, United States. As of 2023, it has an enrollment of approximately 5,700 students and is the third largest school district in Southern Oregon.

The Grants Pass School District's mission is to provide an education that encourages all students to reach their potential. The district serves 5,700 students in six elementary schools, two middle schools, two high schools and an online flexible learning school serving 6th through 12th grade.

== Demographics ==
As of 2021-22, student demographics were White (73%), Hispanic (17%), Multiracial (8%), Asian (1%), Black/African American (<1%) and American Indian/Alaska Native (<1%). More than 20 languages are spoken by students and staff.

In addition, 15% of students receive special services in the Grants Pass School District.

== Speech controversy and litigation ==
In April 2021, Grants Pass School District 7 placed North Middle School assistant principal Rachel Damiano (later known as Rachel Sager) and science and health teacher Katie Medart on paid administrative leave, following controversy over their involvement in the "I Resolve" movement, which gave an alternative policy template recommendation concerning gender identity, pronoun use and private spaces in education. The district subsequently terminated both educators in July 2021, citing violations of district policies. The educators disputed the district's characterization of their activities and challenged the termination.

Damiano and Medart filed a federal lawsuit against the district and individual district officials in June 2021, alleging violations of their rights under the First and Fourteenth Amendments to the United States Constitution, Title VII of the Civil Rights Act of 1964, and the Oregon Constitution. Their claims included First amendment retaliation, viewpoint discrimination, equal protection violations, and religious discrimination. In November 2021, the school board reversed their earlier decision and reinstated both educators. Following their reinstatement, both were reassigned to positions at the district's online school.

In June 2025, The United States Court of Appeals for the Ninth Circuit issued its decision in Damiano v. Grants Pass School District 7. The court affirmed portions of the lower court's decision but vacated summary judgement on several claims and remanded them for further proceedings. These included claims involving First Amendment retaliation, viewpoint discrimination, equal protection, and religious discrimination under Title VII. The Ninth Circuit found that factual disputes remained concerning the district's reasons for terminating the educators and whether those reasons were sufficient to justify the employment decisions. The appellate court did not enter a final judgement establishing whether the district had violated the educators' rights or not.

In November 2025, Grants Pass School District 7 reached a negotiated settlement with Damiano (Sager) and Medart, resolving the federal lawsuit. The agreement provided for a total payment of $650,00, including damages and attorneys' fees. Other reported terms included positive letters of recommendation for both educators, removal of negative references from their personnel files, a public statement by the district acknowledging that its handling of the matter had fallen short of its standards and responsibilities, and revisions to district policies concerning employee speech and religious freedom. The settlement also required Medart to resign her position in the District and neither educator is permitted to be an employee of the district in perpetuity.

In public statements concerning the settlement, the district also stated that neither educator had been found to have committed professional misconduct and both had been cleared of any professional wrongdoing by the Oregon Teacher Standards and Practices Commission.

== School Board ==
- Dustin Smith (Position No. 1)
- Chad Dybdahl (Position No. 2)
- Gary Richardson (Position No. 3)
- Debbie Brownell (Position No. 4)
- Cassie Wilkins (Position No. 5)
- Nathan Seable (Position No. 6)
- Joseph Schmidt (Position No. 7)

== Schools ==
High school

- Grants Pass High School
- Gladiola High School
- New Bridge High School

Middle schools

- North Middle School
- South Middle School

Elementary schools

- Allen Dale Elementary School
- Highland Elementary School
- Lincoln Elementary School
- Parkside Elementary School
- Redwood Elementary School
- Riverside Elementary School

== See also ==
- Three Rivers School District
