= Umpqua Community College =

Public college near Roseburg, Oregon, US

- Motto in English: Transform Your Life
- Type: Public community college
- Established: March 30, 1964; 62 years ago
- Accreditation: NWCCU
- President: Rachel Pokrandt
- Students: 3,300 full-time and 16,000 part-time
- Location: Roseburg, Oregon, U.S. 43.290°N 123.333°W
- Campus: Rural, 100 acres (40 ha)
- Sporting affiliations: Northwest Athletic Conference
- Mascot: Riverhawks
- Website: www.umpqua.edu

Umpqua Community College (UCC) is a public community college near Roseburg, Oregon. The college has sixteen campus buildings located on 100 acres (40 ha) bordering the North Umpqua River. The campus also features a track, tennis courts, and an outdoor pool. In 2009, a vineyard was added to the campus. About 3,300 full-time students and 16,000 part-time students attend UCC. Umpqua Community College serves the greater Douglas County region with the exception of Reedsport and its immediate area along the Oregon Coast.

== History ==
Map of the campus

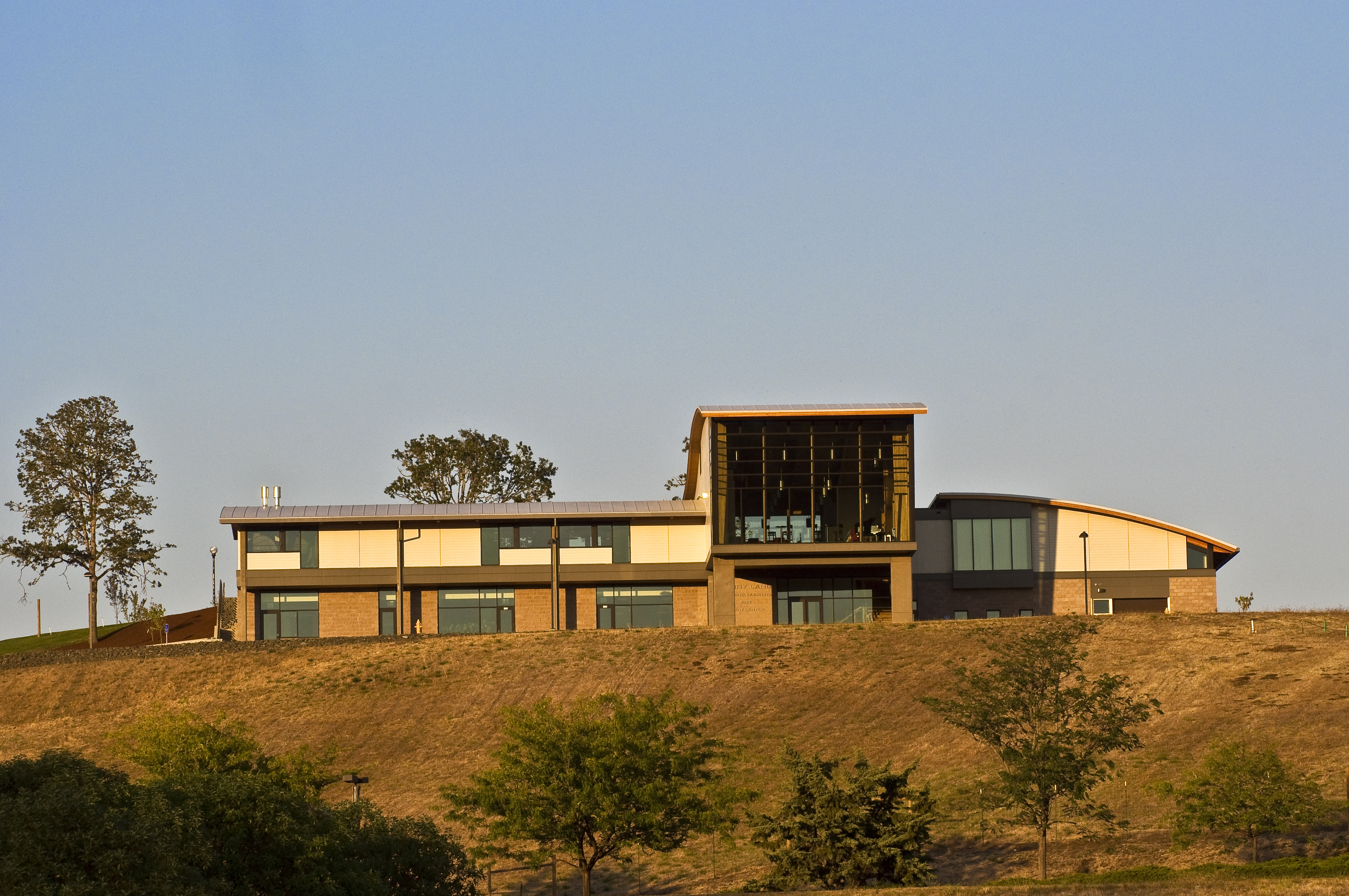
Danny Lang Teaching, Learning and Event Center

=== Origin and early history ===
In the late 1950s, interested community members formed a committee, sponsored by the American Association of University Women, to explore the idea of establishing a community college in Douglas County. After visiting other campuses, the group wrote a report, and in 1960 the Chamber of Commerce formed an Education Committee with Wayne Crooch as its chair. In February 1960, the Roseburg School Board was asked to approve a program of lower-division college courses. The request was approved and an agreement was established with Southern Oregon College (now Southern Oregon University) and the Oregon University System. Harry Jacoby, assistant Superintendent of the Roseburg School District, was named coordinator of the project.

The first college courses were offered in 1961. Classes were first held in rented facilities in Roseburg. The cost was $5 per term and $11 per credit.

After meeting the legal requirements for forming a college district, the Oregon State Board of Higher Education ordered establishment of the proposed district on December 11, 1962. Voters supported formation of the district by voting 3,190 "yes" and 825 "no" on March 30, 1964. The same election also established the first seven-member board of directors. At the first board meeting on April 2, 1964, Ralph Snyder was appointed registrar and Harry Jacoby was hired as the first president of the college.

The land for the campus, 98.5 acres (39.9 ha) of pasture land along a bend in the North Umpqua River, was donated by Elton and Ruth Jackson. The board accepted the site in February 1965. College construction was funded by a serial levy passed in May 1965 and a bond issue passed in 1968. Additional financing came from interest earnings, state funding, and federal grants. Classes were first held on "Phase I" of the new campus in Fall 1967.

=== Introduction of athletics ===
The Athletics department was established in 1967 and joined the Oregon Community College Athletic Association (now the Northwest Athletic Conference) for competition with its first sport, men's basketball. Today, the athletics department offers baseball, men's and women's basketball, cross country, esports, obstacle course racing (the only junior college to offer scholarship competition in obstacle course racing), women's soccer, track and field, women's volleyball, and men's and women's wrestling

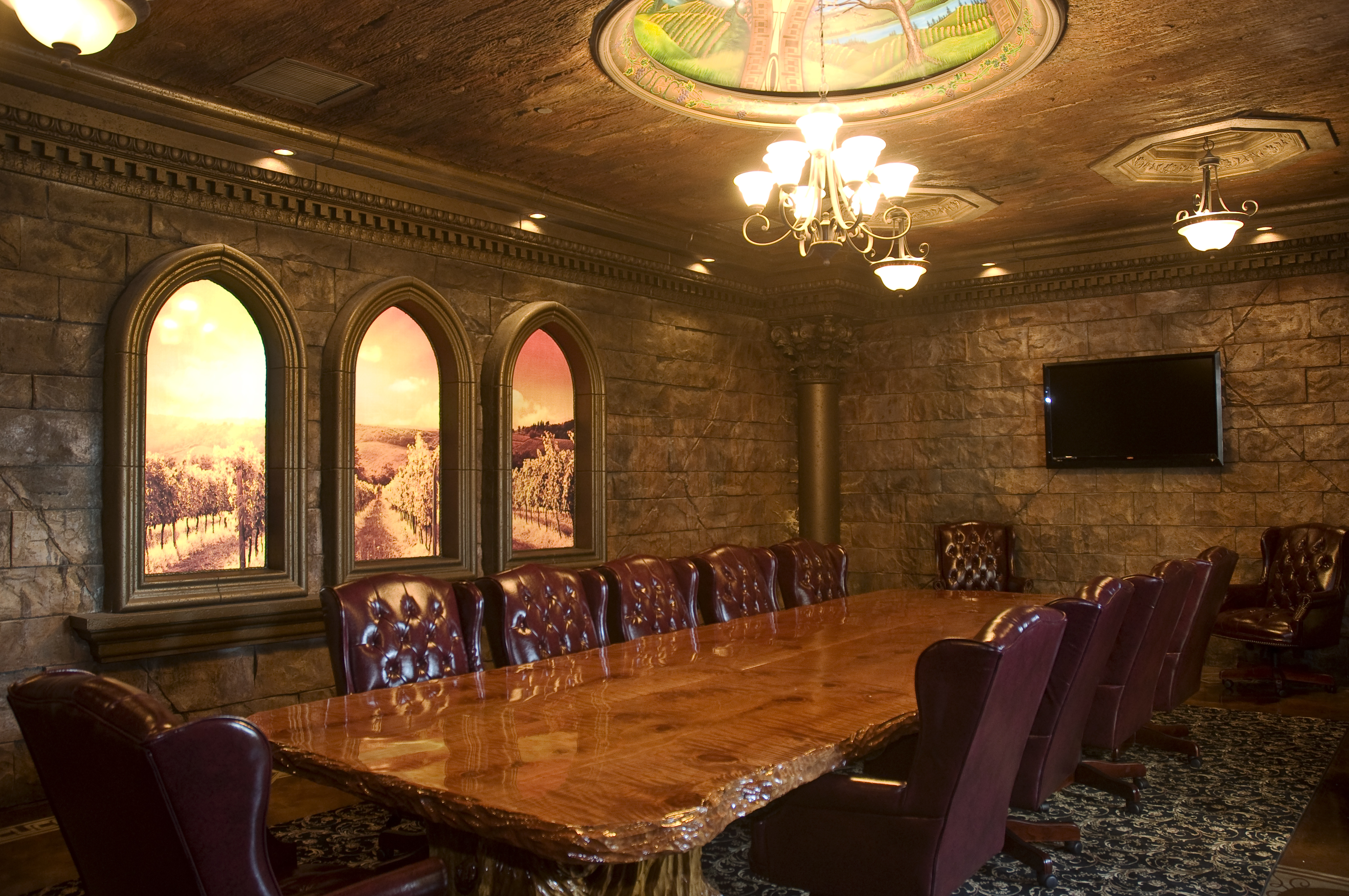
Dr. Blaine D. Nisson Wine Library inside the Danny Lang Teaching, Learning and Event Center.

=== 2000s ===
In September 2010, the school started construction on a $6.7 million viticulture and enology education facility that became the home of the school's Southern Oregon Wine Institute. Opened in 2011, the 22,000 square-foot building was named the Danny Lang Teaching, Learning and Event Center. The winemaking facility has the capacity to produce roughly 3,000 cases and features a gravity flow crush pad and temperature controlled cellar. SOWI also boasts of its "incubator program" which helps startup wineries reduce substantial upfront costs by leasing out space and equipment.

=== Mass shooting ===
On October 1, 2015, a mass shooting occurred on the school campus. Ten people, including the gunman, a 26-year-old UCC student, were killed; eight others were wounded. The shooter killed himself following a brief gun battle with police.

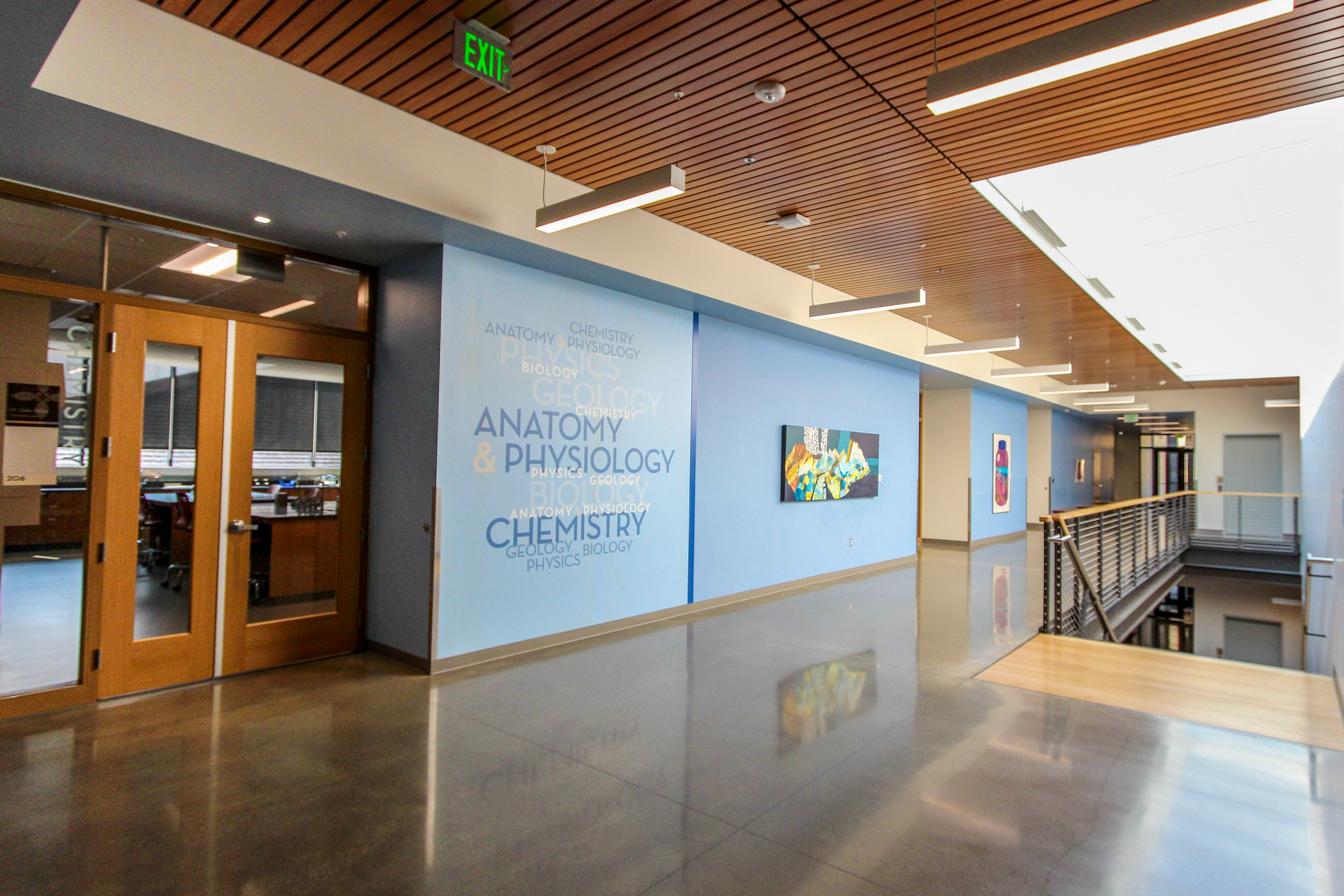
Bonnie J. Ford Health, Nursing & Science Center

=== Recent history ===
UCC's campus added the Bonnie J. Ford Health, Nursing & Science Center in September 2016. The 35,000 square foot center replaced UCC's decades old science building. The building features state of the art labs and classrooms and industry standard simulation floors to give UCC's Nursing and Dental Assisting students the closest on-the-job experience possible.

UCC also houses the Paul Morgan Observatory, designed and built by UCC professor Paul Morgan in 2016 as part of the beginning astronomy program and community outreach. It provides onsite and online viewings of the Sun and night sky and is the only public observatory in Southern Oregon and the only all-digital observatory in the Pacific Northwest.

In March 2018, Tapʰòytʰaʼ Hall was added to the UCC campus. Replacing the previous Snyder Hall, Tapʰòytʰaʼ is an upgraded classroom, office and study building that has received award recognition by the Portland chapter of the American Institute of Architects for its design. The name Tapʰòytʰaʼ (pronounced duh-POY-tuh) translates as "be blessed and to prosper" in the Takelma language which was spoken by the local indigenous Latgawa, Takelma and Cow Creek Band of Umpqua Indians.

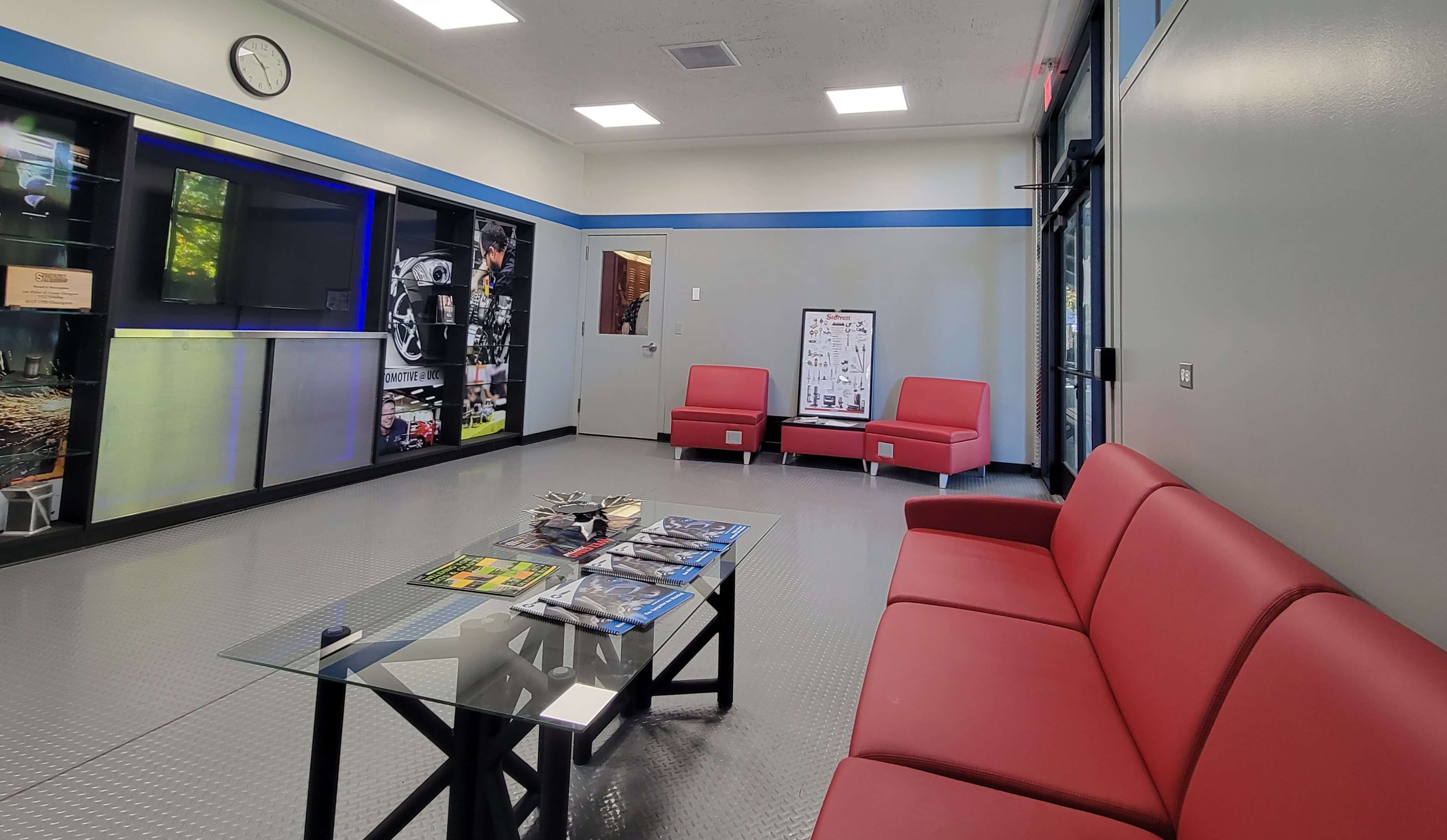
UCC's Lockwood Hall

Students interested in pursuing automotive, welding, and apprenticeship technologies have access to the latest technology and educational resources since the renovation of UCC's Lockwood Hall in 2021.

UCC is one of the 17 member colleges of the Oregon Community College Association. UCC offers a wide variety of associate degrees and certifications; including non-credit licensure, GEDs, and community education classes. As an Oregon public community college, many associate degrees earned by students are also transfer degrees. These transfer degrees allow students to transfer to one of Oregon's 7 public universities as a junior in an undergraduate program. Additionally, UCC has developed specialized articulation partnerships with some 4-year universities including Oregon State University, Southern Oregon University, and Bushnell University.

On April 19, 2025, the head coach and a player of the softball team were killed and eight other team members were injured when a Chevrolet Silverado truck collided head-on with a bus travelling from a game carrying ten members of the team in Coos County. The truck driver, who was under the influence, also suffered serious injuries in the collision. A criminal investigation is ongoing.

== Notable alumni ==
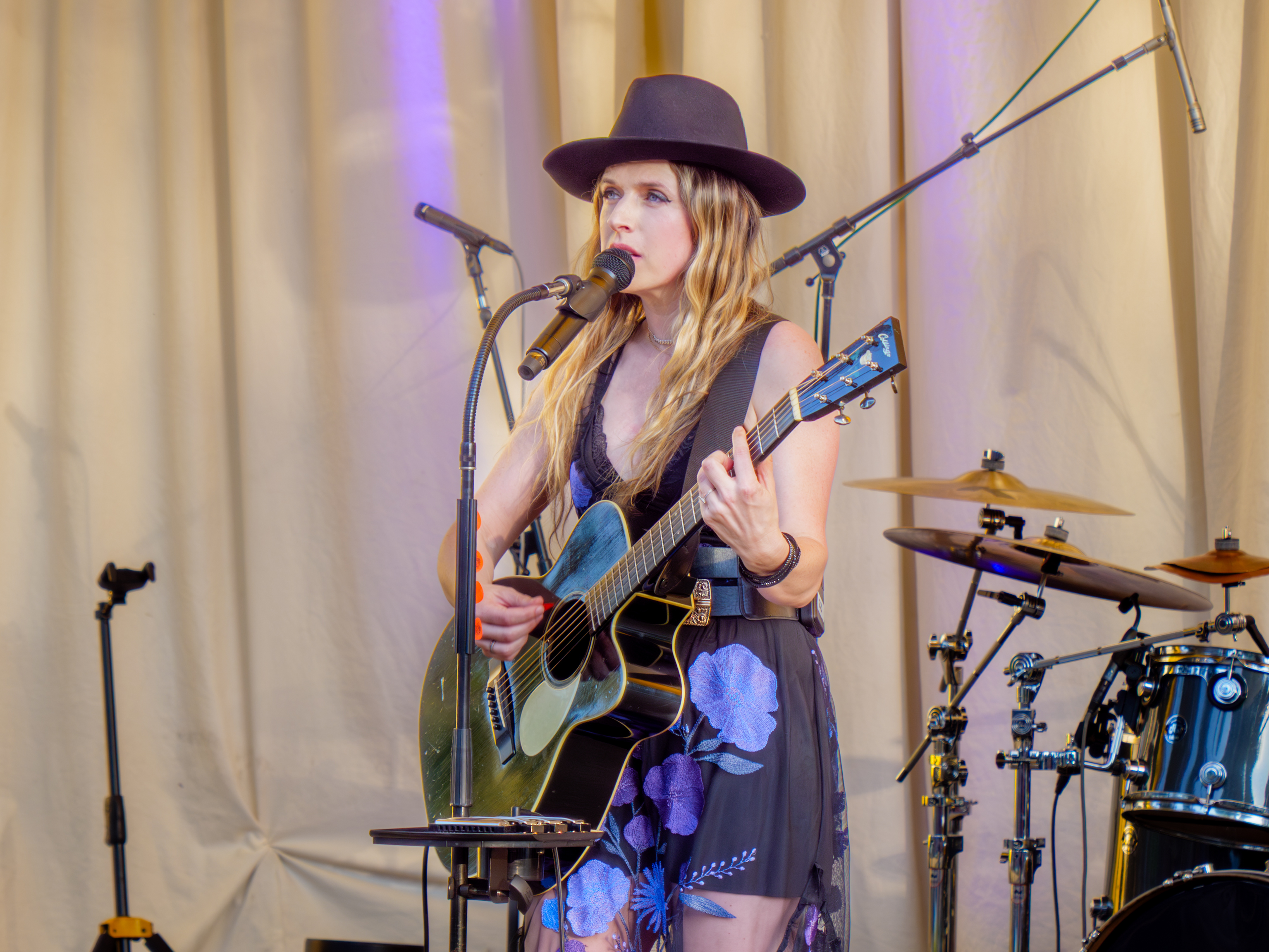
UCC Alumna, ZZ Ward, performing at Music on the Half Shell (Roseburg, OR), July 2025

- Bruce Hanna, American politician and businessman, served as a Republican member of the Oregon House of Representatives. Co-speaker of the House for the 2011–2012 session.
- Hyrum Harris, New Zealand professional basketball player for the Hawke's Bay Hawks of the National Basketball League.
- Zachary Holland, Track & Field athlete and current junior college record holder for the men's javelin. Set at the 2022 NWAC championships. 80.61m | 264–5. Also had two top 10 finishes at USATF national championships (9th at the 2021 USA Olympic trials, 8th at the 2022 USA National Championships)
- Gary Leif, American politician and businessman, served as a Republican member of the Oregon House of Representatives.
- Alek Skarlatos, known for heroism in attempted Thalys train attack in France in 2015 and Republican member of the Oregon House of Representatives.
- Tamina Snuka, American professional wrestler, former WWE women's tag team champion.
- ZZ Ward, Billboard charts number 1 Blues Albums charting American singer-songwriter.

== See also ==
- List of colleges and universities in Oregon
