= KLDR =

- Harbeck-Fruitdale, Oregon; United States
- Broadcast area: Grants Pass, Oregon-Medford, Oregon
- Frequency: 98.3 MHz
- Branding: KLDR; The Music Leader

Programming
- Format: Adult Top 40

Ownership
- Owner: Grants Pass Broadcasting Corp.
- Sister stations: KAJO

History
- First air date: May 3, 1991 (as KAJO-FM)
- Former call signs: KAJO-FM (1991–1992)
- Call sign meaning: The Music LeaDeR

Technical information
- Licensing authority: FCC
- Facility ID: 24821
- Class: C2
- ERP: 1,850 watts
- HAAT: 638 meters (2,093 ft)
- Transmitter coordinates: 42°22′56″N 123°16′29″W
- Translator: see below

Links
- Public license information: Public file; LMS
- Webcast: Listen Live
- Website: kldr.com

KLDR (98.3 FM) is a radio station broadcasting an adult top 40 music format. Licensed to Harbeck-Fruitdale, Oregon, United States, the station serves Southern Oregon, including Grants Pass, Medford, and the Illinois Valley. The station is currently owned by Grants Pass Broadcasting Corp.

== History ==
The station came on the air in 1991 as KAJO-FM, an FM simulcast of AM 1270 KAJO.

In 1992, the simulcast was discontinued, as the station became “The Leader” KLDR, with a more gold-based Adult Contemporary format. The first song played on KLDR was “Africa” from Toto. Within a couple of years after its launch, KLDR moved in the direction of Top 40.

Former logo

== Translators ==
KLDR broadcasts on the following translators:

Broadcast translator for KLDR
| Call sign | Frequency | City of license | FID | ERP (W) | Class | FCC info |
|---|---|---|---|---|---|---|
| K251AX | 98.1 FM | Medford, Oregon | 24825 | 41 | D | LMS |
| K283AE | 104.5 FM | Cave Junction, Oregon | 24826 | 11 | D | LMS |
