= XHSCBU-FM =

Community radio station in Xalatlaco, State of Mexico, Mexico

Xalatlaco, State of Mexico; Mexico
- Frequency: 106.7 FM

Programming
- Format: Community radio

Ownership
- Owner: Sueños de Vida Xalatlaquense, A.C.

History
- First air date: August 1, 2019
- Call sign meaning: (templated callsign)

Technical information
- Class: D
- ERP: 50 watts
- HAAT: -125.1 m
- Transmitter coordinates: 19°10′42.3″N 99°25′50.7″W

XHSCBU-FM is a community radio station on 106.7 FM in Xalatlaco, State of Mexico. The station is owned by the civil association Sueños de Vida Xalatlaquense, A.C.

== History ==
Sueños de Vida Xalatlaquense filed for a community station on October 13, 2016. The station was approved on September 5, 2018 and signed on August 1, 2019.
