= Harbeck-Fruitdale, Oregon =

Unincorporated community in the state of Oregon, United States

- CDP
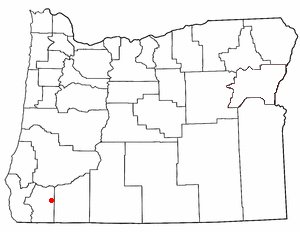
- Location of Harbeck-Fruitdale, Oregon
- Coordinates: 42°24′58″N 123°19′14″W
- Country: United States
- State: Oregon
- County: Josephine

Area
  - Total: 1.6 sq mi (4.2 km^{2})
  - Land: 1.6 sq mi (4.1 km^{2})
  - Water: 0.039 sq mi (0.1 km^{2})
- Elevation: 991 ft (302 m)

Population (2000)
  - Total: 3,780
  - Density: 2,385/sq mi (920.9/km^{2})
- Time zone: UTC-8 (Pacific (PST))
  - Summer (DST): UTC-7 (PDT)
- ZIP code: 97527
- Area codes: 541 and 458
- FIPS code: 41-32075
- GNIS feature ID: 2408349

Harbeck-Fruitdale was formerly a census-designated place (CDP) in Josephine County, Oregon, United States, near Grants Pass. As of the 2000 census, the CDP population was 3,780. It includes the community of Fruitdale.

== Geography ==
According to the United States Census Bureau, the CDP has a total area of 1.6 square miles (4.1 km^{2}), of which, 1.6 square miles (4.1 km^{2}) of it is land and 0.04 square miles (0.10 km^{2}) of it (2.47%) is water.

== Demographics ==
As of the census of 2000, there were 3,780 people, 1,553 households, and 1,071 families residing in the CDP. The population density was 2,385.1 inhabitants per square mile (920.9/km^{2}). There were 1,655 housing units at an average density of 1,044.3 per square mile (403.2/km^{2}). The racial makeup of the CDP was 93.76% White, 0.24% African American, 1.27% Native American, 0.61% Asian, 0.03% Pacific Islander, 2.17% from other races, and 1.93% from two or more races. Hispanic or Latino of any race were 6.61% of the population.

There were 1,553 households, out of which 27.4% had children under the age of 18 living with them, 53.8% were married couples living together, 11.0% had a female householder with no husband present, and 31.0% were non-families. 24.9% of all households were made up of individuals, and 13.4% had someone living alone who was 65 years of age or older. The average household size was 2.42 and the average family size was 2.83.

In the CDP, the population was spread out, with 23.2% under the age of 18, 6.1% from 18 to 24, 23.3% from 25 to 44, 23.9% from 45 to 64, and 23.6% who were 65 years of age or older. The median age was 43 years. For every 100 females, there were 94.1 males. For every 100 females age 18 and over, there were 92.4 males.

The median income for a household in the CDP was $29,821, and the median income for a family was $35,112. Males had a median income of $32,875 versus $21,193 for females. The per capita income for the CDP was $14,535. About 14.0% of families and 19.2% of the population were below the poverty line, including 32.6% of those under age 18 and 8.3% of those age 65 or over.
