= WHFI =

- Lindside, West Virginia; United States
- Broadcast area: Monroe County, West Virginia
- Frequency: 106.7 MHz
- Branding: Classic Hits 106

Programming
- Format: Classic hits

Ownership
- Owner: Monroe County Board of Education

History
- First air date: 1990

Technical information
- Licensing authority: FCC
- Facility ID: 43539
- Class: A
- Power: 6,000 watts
- HAAT: 37 meters (121 ft)
- Transmitter coordinates: 37°28′56.0″N 80°39′40.0″W

Links
- Public license information: Public file; LMS
- Website: WHFI Online

WHFI is a classic hits formatted broadcast non-commercial educational radio station licensed in Lindside, West Virginia, serving Monroe County, West Virginia. The station also reaches into surrounding counties including Giles County, Virginia, Greenbrier, Mercer, Raleigh, and Summers Counties in West Virginia. WHFI is owned by the Monroe County Board of Education under Station Manager, Brian Allen.

== Programming ==
Aside from its Classic Hits format that includes music from the 70s, 80s, and 90s, WHFI switches format on weekends and airs Bluegrass, Classic Country, Classic Rock, Classic Contemporary Christian, and Oldies (50s & 60s). They also broadcast sporting events for Monroe County's James Monroe High School, focusing on football and basketball. WHFI also provides original, local programming including "Can Chaser Weekly" (National Barrel Racing Association News), "Two Lane Highway" (local and regional artists), "Keep the Faith" (spiritual messages in pop music), and the occasional "Bargain Banter" (variety talk). The station has an agreement with WV Public Broadcasting and airs "Inside Appalachia" once a week.

== Studios/Transmitter ==
WHFI's studios are located in the Monroe County Technical School in Lindside, with its tower located behind James Monroe High School also in Lindside.
