= North Valley High School =

Location
- 6741 Monument Drive; Grants Pass, Josephine County, Oregon 97526; United States; 42.518385°N 123.370819°W

Information
- Type: Public
- Opened: 1977
- School district: Three Rivers School District
- Principal: Lindsey Namanny
- Grades: 9-12
- Enrollment: 429 (2023-2024)
- Colors: Cardinal and gold
- Athletics conference: OSAA Southern Oregon Conference 3A-7
- Mascot: Knight
- Rival: Hidden Valley
- Website: Official website

North Valley High School is a public high school located in Grants Pass, Oregon, United States. The school serves the communities of Merlin, Galice, Sunny Valley, and Wolf Creek.

== Athletics ==
Since opening in 1977, North Valley has won eight Oregon State championships, including the Triple Crown (boys' football, basketball, and baseball) in the 1984–1985 school year. The girls' Cheerleading squad also won the OSAA Cheerleading Championship in the same school year. In 2012 Ryan Melnychuk won the individual OSAA Golf State Championships with a score of 3 under, he also broke an opening round scoring record with a 67. In 2013 Boys' Basketball won the Oregon state championship tournament with a record of 27–0 becoming the only team in Oregon to go undefeated and win the State Championship that year. The 2016 Girls' Soccer team won the 4A Oregon State Championship completing an 18–0–0 undefeated season.

- Football: 1984
- Boys' Basketball : 1985, 2013
- Baseball: 1985
- Boys' Track & Field : 1991
- Cheerleading: 1984, 1985, 1993, 1996
- Golf: 2012
- Girls Track and Field State Champions: 2014
- Girls Soccer Undefeated State Champions: 2016
- Girls Soccer Skyline Conference Champions: 2015, 2016, 2017, 2018 (Co-Champion), 2019
