= Christine Goodwin (politician) =

American politician

Member of the Oregon House of Representatives
- In office January 9, 2023 – January 13, 2025
- Preceded by: Duane Stark
- Succeeded by: Alek Skarlatos
- Constituency: 4th district
- In office August 25, 2021 – January 9, 2023
- Preceded by: Gary Leif
- Succeeded by: Virgle Osborne
- Constituency: 2nd district

Personal details
- Party: Republican
- Spouse: Lynn Goodwin
- Children: 2
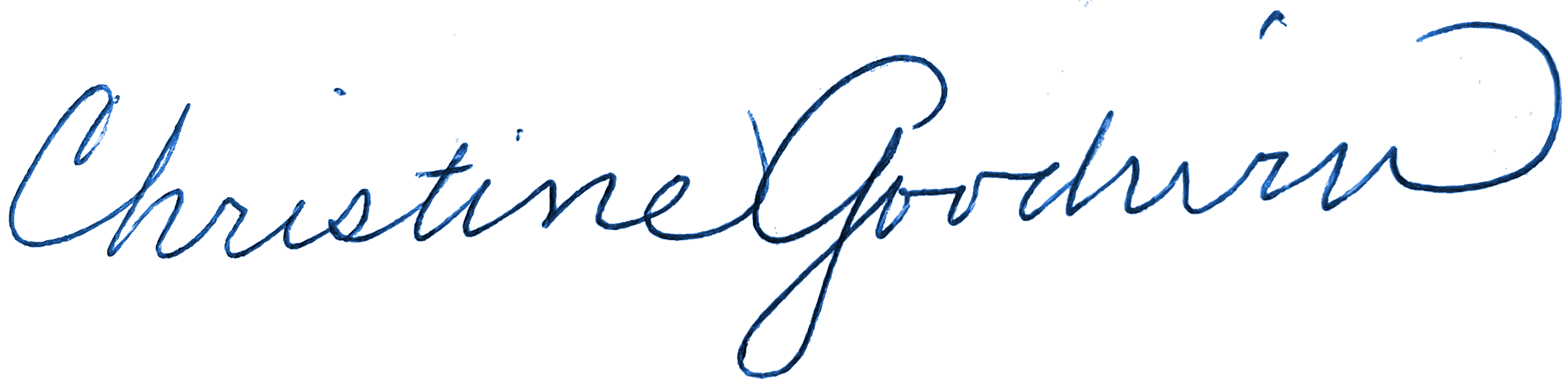
- Signature

Christine Goodwin is an American businesswoman and politician who served as a member of the Oregon House of Representatives for the 4th district from 2023 to 2025. Goodwin was appointed to the House on August 12, 2021, succeeding Gary Leif for the 2nd district seat. She went on to be elected to the Oregon's 4th House district on November 8, 2022, and assumed office on January 9, 2023.

== Career ==
Goodwin began her career as a teacher and coach at Roseburg High School. She later worked as the administrator of her husband's optometry practice. Goodwin also founded a local coffee house and fitness club. She served as an interim member of the Douglas County Board of Commissioners. Goodwin was appointed to serve as a member of the Oregon House of Representatives in August 2021, succeeding Gary Leif, who died in office. She was sworn in on August 25, 2021.

== Political positions ==
Following the Standoff at Eagle Pass, Goodwin signed a letter in support of Texas Governor Greg Abbott's decision in the conflict.

== Electoral history ==
2022 Oregon State Representative, 4th district
Party	Candidate	Votes	%
Republican	Christine Goodwin	23,634	97.2
Write-in		691	2.8
Total votes		24,325	100%

=== District 2 ===
==== 2024 Republican primary ====
2024 Oregon Senate district 2 Republican primary
Party	Candidate	Votes	%
Republican	Noah Robinson	13,228	61.1
Republican	Christine Goodwin	8,367	38.7
Write-in		51	0.2
Total votes		21,646	0.3

Oregon House of Representatives
Preceded by Gary Leif	Member of the Oregon House of Representatives from the 2nd district 2021–2023	Succeeded by Virgle Osborne
Preceded by Duane Stark	Member of the Oregon House of Representatives from the 4th district 2023–2025	Succeeded by Alek Skarlatos
