= KZLX-LP =

- Maryville, Missouri; United States
- Frequency: 106.7 MHz
- Branding: The X

Programming
- Format: Top 40 and urban contemporary

Ownership
- Owner: Northwest Foundation, Incorporated

Technical information
- Licensing authority: FCC
- Facility ID: 131938
- Class: L1
- Power: 42 watts
- HAAT: 50 meters (160 ft)
- Transmitter coordinates: 40°21′36″N 94°53′0″W

Links
- Public license information: LMS
- Webcast: Listen live
- Website: kzlx1067.wixsite.com/kzlxfm

KZLX-LP (106.7 FM) is a radio station broadcasting a Top 40 and urban contemporary format. The station is located in Maryville, Missouri, and serves the Maryville area. The station is run by students of Northwest Missouri State University.

It started as KDLX in 1960 as a carrier current station and broadcast only in Northwest buildings. During the period when John Jasinski was faculty advisor, the station received a Marconi Award for nation's most outstanding college radio station in 1992. On June 19, 2002, it became a low power station broadcasting with 42 watts effective radiated power and antenna 45.7 meters height above average terrain.
