= Lindside, West Virginia =

- Unincorporated community
- Location within West Virginia Location within the United States
- Coordinates: 37°27′13″N 80°40′11″W
- Country: United States
- State: West Virginia
- County: Monroe
- Elevation: 1,995 ft (608 m)
- Time zone: UTC-5 (Eastern (EST))
  - Summer (DST): UTC-4 (EDT)
- ZIP code: 24951
- Area codes: 304 & 681
- GNIS feature ID: 1551817

Lindside is an unincorporated community in Monroe County, West Virginia, United States. Lindside is located on U.S. Route 219, northeast of Peterstown. Lindside has a post office with ZIP code 24951.

The name Lindside was derived from linden, a type of tree, according to local history.
