= Oregon's 4th House district =

Legislative districts in the state of Oregon

Oregon's 4th House district after redistricting after the 2020 Census

District 4 of the Oregon House of Representatives is one of 60 House legislative districts in the state of Oregon. As of 2021, the boundary for the district includes portions of Douglas, Jackson, and Josephine counties. The current representative for the district is Republican Alek Skarlatos of Canyonville.

== Election results ==
District boundaries have changed over time. Therefore, representatives before 2021 may not represent the same constituency as today. General election results from 2000 to present are as follows:

Year	Candidate	Party	Percent	Opponent	Party	Percent	Write-in percentage
2000	Alan Brown	Republican	51.73%	Sharon Branstiter	Democratic	48.27%	
2002	Dennis Richardson	Republican	60.35%	Shayne Maxwell	Democratic	39.25%	0.39%
2004	Dennis Richardson	Republican	71.10%	Richard Koopmans	Democratic	28.90%	
2006	Dennis Richardson	Republican	69.54%	Richard Koopmans	Democratic	30.16%	0.30%
2008	Dennis Richardson	Republican	70.63%	Keith Wangle	Independent	28.96%	0.42%
2010	Dennis Richardson	Republican	70.47%	Rick Levine	Democratic	29.32%	0.20%
2012	Dennis Richardson	Republican	86.95%	Richard Hake	Constitution	12.45%	0.60%
2014	Duane Stark	Republican	68.53%	Darlene Taylor	Democratic	31.09%	0.38%
2016	Duane Stark	Republican	98.30%	Unopposed			1.70%
2018	Duane Stark	Republican	98.09%	Unopposed			1.91%
2020	Duane Stark	Republican	68.92%	Mary Middleton	Democratic	30.93%	0.15%
2022	Christine Goodwin	Republican	97.16%	Unopposed			0.15%
2024	Alek Skarlatos	Republican	70.2%	Richard Chasm	Democratic	29.6%	0.2%

== See also ==
- Oregon Legislative Assembly
- Oregon House of Representatives
