= CJWT-FM =

First Nations radio station in Ontario, Canada

Coordinates: 48°28′23″N 81°19′40″W

- Timmins, Ontario; Canada
- Frequency: 106.7 MHz
- Branding: Wawatay

Programming
- Format: First Nations community radio

Ownership
- Owner: Wawatay Native Communications Society

History
- First air date: 2006

Technical information
- Class: LP
- ERP: 50 W
- HAAT: 20 metres (66 ft)

Links
- Website: www.wawataynews.ca

CJWT-FM is a First Nations community radio station that operates at 106.7 FM in Timmins, Ontario.

Owned by the Wawatay Native Communications Society, the station was given approval by the Canadian Radio-television and Telecommunications Commission in 2006.

On March 4, 2016, the CRTC approved Wawatay's application for a broadcasting licence to operate a low-power Type B Native FM radio station in Timmins, Ontario. The station will operate at 106.7 MHz (channel 294LP) with an effective radiated power of 50 watts (non-directional antenna with an effective height above average terrain of 20 metres).
