= WGGP-LP =

- Big Pine Key, Florida; United States
- Frequency: 106.7 MHz

Ownership
- Owner: First Baptist Church Big Pine Key

Technical information
- Licensing authority: FCC
- Facility ID: 133257
- Class: L1
- ERP: 100 watts
- HAAT: 29.9 meters (98 ft)
- Transmitter coordinates: 24°40′46.51″N 81°21′54.29″W

Links
- Public license information: LMS

WGGP-LP (106.7 FM) is a radio station licensed to Big Pine Key, Florida, United States. The station is currently owned by First Baptist Church Big Pine Key.
