= KNKI =

- Pinetop-Lakeside, Arizona; United States
- Broadcast area: Show Low, Arizona
- Frequency: 106.7 MHz
- Branding: iTalk 106.7

Programming
- Format: Talk and sports
- Affiliations: CBS News Radio; Fox News Radio; Fox Sports Radio; Westwood One

Ownership
- Owner: WSK Family Credit Shelter Trust UTA

History
- First air date: 2007
- Former call signs: KWSK (2007–2008)
- Call sign meaning: Konopnicki

Technical information
- Licensing authority: FCC
- Facility ID: 78413
- Class: C1
- ERP: 65,000 watts
- HAAT: 357 meters (1,171 ft)
- Transmitter coordinates: 34°15′6″N 109°35′6″W

Links
- Public license information: Public file; LMS
- Webcast: Listen live
- Website: italk1067.com

KNKI (106.7 FM) is a radio station licensed to Pinetop-Lakeside, Arizona. The station broadcasts a talk and sports format and is owned by WSK Family Credit Shelter Trust UTA.
