= Hidden Valley High School (Oregon) =

Public school in Grants Pass, Oregon, United States

Location
- 651 Murphy Creek Road; Grants Pass, (Josephine County), Oregon 97527; United States; 42°19′32″N 123°20′12″W

Information
- Type: Public
- Opened: 1977
- School district: Three Rivers School District
- Principal: Damian Crowson
- Grades: 9-12
- Enrollment: 523 (2023-2024)
- Colors: Blue and orange
- Athletics conference: OSAA Skyline Conference 4A-5
- Mascot: Mustang
- Rival: North Valley
- Website: Hidden Valley High School

Hidden Valley High School is a public high school in Grants Pass, Oregon, United States.

== Academics ==
In 2008, 68% of the school's seniors received a high school diploma. Of 228 students, 155 graduated, 43 dropped out, three received a modified diploma, and 27 were still in high school the following year.

=== Students ===
Hidden Valley primarily serves students from the Applegate Valley, the community of Williams and the south Rogue Valley area. The school enrolls roughly 600 students in grades 9-12. 89% of the students are White, 6% are Hispanic, and 3% are Native American.

In October 2007 the school was listed on a state watch list due to safety issues.

== Extracurricular activities ==
19 Future Business Leaders of America (FBLA) students qualified for the National FBLA competition finals, held in Denver, Colorado in July 2004. In 2008, they won their seventh consecutive state title.

== Athletics ==
=== State championships ===
- Boys' cross country - 2008
- Boys' basketball - 2006
- Girls' soccer - 2006, 2007
- Boys' soccer - 1993, 2000

== Notable alumni ==
- Ty Burrell — actor, Modern Family
