= KSMY =

- Lompoc, California; United States
- Broadcast area: Santa Maria
- Frequency: 106.7 MHz
- Branding: La Mejor 106.7 FM

Programming
- Language: Spanish
- Format: Oldies

Ownership
- Owner: Lazer Media; (Lazer Licenses, LLC)

History
- First air date: 1997
- Former call signs: KAKV (1995–2000)

Technical information
- Licensing authority: FCC
- Facility ID: 63553
- Class: B1
- ERP: 3,500 watts
- HAAT: 268 meters (879 ft)
- Transmitter coordinates: 34°44′31″N 120°26′46″W

Links
- Public license information: Public file; LMS
- Website: lamejornetwork.com

KSMY (106.7 FM, "La Mejor 106.7") is a commercial radio station licensed to Lompoc, California, United States and serves the Santa Maria—Lompoc area. The station is owned by Alfredo Plascencia's Lazer Media, through licensee Lazer Licenses, LLC, and broadcasts a Spanish oldies format.

== History ==
The station first signed on in 1997 as KAKV and originally was owned by Stuart McRae. The station aired an adult standards format. On January 21, 2000, KAKV changed its call letters to KSMY.

In February 2000, McRae Media Group sold KSMY, then broadcasting a contemporary hit radio format, to Fresno, California-based Bathysphere Broadcasting Corporation for $525,000. The station changed hands once more in September when Bathysphere sold 11 stations throughout Central California, plus a construction permit for KSMY, to Clear Channel Communications for $45 million. The permit authorized KSMY to operate with an effective radiated power of 1,650 watts at 377 meters (1,237 ft) height above average terrain.

On July 15, 2002, KSMY switched formats from oldies to hot adult contemporary, identifying as "My 106.7".

On June 29, 2007, Clear Channel divested 16 stations in California and Arizona, including KSMY, to private equity firm Frontier Capital Partners for $40 million. At the time of the sale, the station aired a Spanish adult hits format known as "La Preciosa".

In May 2009, El Dorado Broadcasters dropped La Preciosa from KSMY in favor of Spanish adult contemporary with the branding "El Compa". The new format emphasized hit songs from the 1980s to the present.

In 2016, El Dorado sold all of its stations in the Santa Maria radio market. KSMY was sold to Lazer Broadcasting for $400,000. Lazer flipped the station to Spanish oldies and rebranded it as "La Mejor".
