= KDKN =

- Ellington, Missouri; United States
- Frequency: 106.7 MHz
- Branding: 106.7 The Zone

Programming
- Format: Alternative rock

Ownership
- Owner: Fred Dockins; (Dockins Communications, Inc.)

History
- First air date: 1999 (as KAUL)
- Last air date: February 2026
- Former call signs: KAUL (1997–2009)

Technical information
- Licensing authority: FCC
- Facility ID: 86018
- Class: C2
- ERP: 18,500 watts
- HAAT: 250 meters (820 ft)
- Transmitter coordinates: 37°11′35.1″N 90°39′49.4″W

Links
- Public license information: Public file; LMS

KDKN (106.7 FM) was a radio station broadcasting an alternative rock format. Licensed to Ellington, Missouri, United States, the station was owned by Fred Dockins, through licensee Dockins Communications, Inc.

The station went on the air in 1999 as KAUL, carrying the New Life Evangelistic Center's mixture of southern gospel, contemporary Christian music, and Christian talk and teaching programming. Dockins purchased the station from New Life Evangelistic Center for $107,500 in 2009. In February 2026, KDKN went off the air and turned in its license to the Federal Communications Commission; by that point, the station was "106.7 The Zone", a rock station.
