= KSIG (AM) =

Radio station in Crowley, Louisiana

- Crowley, Louisiana; United States
- Broadcast area: Lafayette, Louisiana
- Frequency: 1450 kHz
- Branding: Sunny 95.1

Programming
- Format: Soft adult contemporary
- Affiliations: Compass Media Networks

Ownership
- Owner: Acadia Broadcast Partners, Inc.
- Sister stations: KWLL-FM; KYBG

History
- First air date: May 1947

Technical information
- Licensing authority: FCC
- Facility ID: 342
- Class: C
- Power: 1,000 watts
- Transmitter coordinates: 30°13′44.4″N 92°21′0″W
- Translator: 95.1 K236CW (Crowley)

Links
- Public license information: Public file; LMS
- Webcast: Listen live
- Website: www.mysunny951.com

KSIG (1450 AM) is a commercial radio station in Crowley, Louisiana, United States, broadcasting a soft adult contemporary format. It is owned by Acadia Broadcast Partners, Inc. The studios and transmitter are located separately in Crowley.

KSIG has a power of 1,000 watts. Programming is also heard on FM translator K236CW at 95.1 MHz. The station uses the FM dial position in its moniker, "Sunny 95.1." The stations can also be heard in the Lafayette metropolitan area.

== History ==
KSIG signed on the air in May 1947. It was originally powered at 250 watts, a fraction of its current output. KSIG was a network affiliate of the Mutual Broadcasting System. Through format and ownership changes, it has used the same call sign since then.

On October 4, 2018, Acadia Broadcast Partners, Inc. flipped KSIG from oldies as "Kool 1450" to soft adult contemporary as Sunny 95.1. The format change took place with the sign-on of a new FM translator, K236CW, on 95.1 FM, which also covers the Lafayette metropolitan area.

On April 1, 2023, KSIG changed its format from soft adult contemporary to classic country, branded as "Freedom 95.1". The format moved from sister station KPCZ-FM. On January 19, 2026, KSIG went back to soft adult contemporary and the "Sunny 95.1" branding.

== Translators ==
Broadcast translator for KSIG
Call sign	Frequency	City of license	FID	ERP (W)	HAAT	Class	Transmitter coordinates	FCC info
K236CW	95.1 FM	Crowley, Louisiana	203004	250	50 m (164 ft)	D	30°13′45″N 92°20′59″W	LMS
