= KNAN =

- Nanakuli, Hawaii; United States
- Broadcast area: Honolulu metropolitan area
- Frequency: 106.7 MHz

Programming
- Format: Rhythmic AC

Ownership
- Owner: Big D Consulting, Inc.

History
- First air date: June 2009
- Call sign meaning: Nanakuli

Technical information
- Licensing authority: FCC
- Facility ID: 165992
- Class: C2
- ERP: 1,850 watts
- HAAT: 645 meters (2,116 ft)
- Transmitter coordinates: 21°24′05″N 158°5′53″W

Links
- Public license information: Public file; LMS

KNAN (106.7 FM) is a commercial radio station licensed to Nanakuli, Hawaii, United States, and serving the Honolulu metropolitan area. It has a rhythmic adult contemporary format and is owned by Big D Consulting, Inc. KNAN's transmitter is sited off of Palehua Road in Akupu, Hawaii.

== History ==
The station signed on in June 2009. At first, it tested a classic hits format as part of its soft launch. The station used a cell tower to broadcast its signal while it looked for a studio and transmitter facilities. According to Will Kemp, whose Kemp Communications is a part-owner of KNAN, the future format will not be another Top 40 or Rhythmic outlet, which had been speculated because Kemp owns Rhythmic KVEG Las Vegas, Nevada. There were rumors that a fourth Rhythmic Contemporary would join the others on the Honolulu dial. "It's [meaning the new format] going to stay a secret," Kemp said.

When the station officially launched, it took a hot adult contemporary format, positioning it between Top 40 hits and mainstream adult contemporary. It eventually switched to rhythmic adult contemporary, and the station began competing with KUMU-FM. A transmitter site was found in Akupu, putting KNAN's antenna amid the towers for Honolulu TV and FM stations.
