= CFET-FM =

Radio station in Tagish, Yukon, Canada

- Tagish, Yukon; Canada
- Frequency: 106.7 MHz
- Branding: Borealis Broadcasting

Programming
- Format: Community radio, classic rock

Ownership
- Owner: Robert G. Hopkins

History
- First air date: 2003

Technical information
- Licensing authority: CRTC
- ERP: 50 watts
- HAAT: 17.5 metres (57 ft)
- Transmitter coordinates: 60°16′00″N 134°08′13″W

Links
- Website: cfetradio.com

CFET-FM is a Canadian radio station, broadcasting at 106.7 FM in Tagish, Yukon.

The station was licensed in 2002, and was launched in 2003 by Rob Hopkins, the station broadcasts a classic rock and community radio format.

On August 30, 2012, Robert G. Hopkins received approval to add a low-power FM transmitter at Haines Junction, Yukon. The new transmitter will operate at 99.9 MHz.
