= WKVK =

Coordinates: 36.419°N 79.197°W

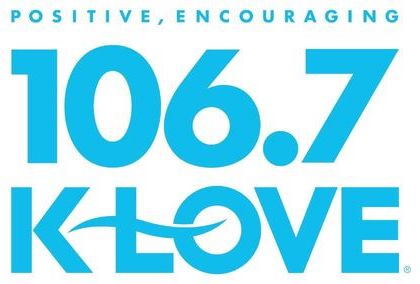
- Semora, North Carolina; United States
- Frequency: 106.7 MHz
- Branding: K-Love

Programming
- Format: Contemporary Christian
- Affiliations: K-LOVE

Ownership
- Owner: Educational Media Foundation

History
- Former call signs: WQVA (1993–1995); WPXX (1995–2001); WKVE (2001–2009)

Technical information
- Licensing authority: FCC
- Facility ID: 26296
- Class: C2
- ERP: 50,000 watts
- HAAT: 150 meters

Links
- Public license information: Public file; LMS
- Webcast: Listen Live
- Website: klove.com

WKVK (106.7 FM) is a radio station broadcasting a Contemporary Christian format. Licensed to Semora, North Carolina, it serves a large swath of central North Carolina and Southside Virginia as an outlet of K-LOVE. The station is currently owned by Educational Media Foundation.

Southern Entertainment Corporation signed on WPXX as a 6,000-watt class A FM in early 1996 from nearby Danville, Virginia, as contemporary hits "Danville Pixx 106.7". Studios were located on Northmont Boulevard, just off North Main Street with a tower site west of Danville. On July 1, 1998, WPXX flipped to a satellite-delivered oldies format as "Pixx Pure Gold 106.7". After several offers from companies looking to move this valuable frequency to the bigger surrounding markets, K-Love parent company Educational Media Foundation bought WPXX in 2000, taking the station non-commercial as WKVE with the network's contemporary Christian format. Several months later, the newly minted WKVE upgraded to a class "C2" with 50,000 watts, adding Durham, Chapel Hill, Burlington and Greensboro to their coverage area from a new tower site near Yanceyville, in Caswell County. On March 9, 2009, the station became WKVK, and the former call letters went to a classic rock station at 103.1 in Mount Pleasant, Pennsylvania.

== Translators ==
In addition to the main station, WKVK is relayed by an additional five translators to widen its broadcast area.

Broadcast translator for WKVK
Call sign	Frequency	City of license	FID	ERP (W)	FCC info
W289BX	105.7 FM	Henderson, North Carolina		13 watts	
