= KGTN-LP =

Community radio station in Georgetown, Texas, United States

Coordinates: 30.592°N 97.679°W

- Georgetown, Texas; United States
- Broadcast area: Georgetown, Texas
- Frequency: 106.7 MHz
- Branding: Radio Georgetown

Programming
- Format: Variety

Ownership
- Owner: Power Radio Corporation

History
- Former call signs: KXPW-LP (2003–2016)
- Call sign meaning: Georgetown

Technical information
- Licensing authority: FCC
- Facility ID: 133411
- Class: L1
- ERP: 12 watts
- HAAT: 86.1 meters

Links
- Public license information: LMS
- Webcast: Listen live
- Website: radiogeorgetown.org

KGTN-LP (106.7 FM) is a radio station broadcasting a Variety format. Licensed to Georgetown, Texas, United States, it serves the Georgetown area. The station is currently owned by Power Radio Corporation.

On March 19, 2009, the Federal Communications Commission (FCC) found that this station had aired eight different commercials "several thousand times" over a 14-month period, and levied a $20,000 fine. This wasn't the first time the then-KXPW-LP got in trouble with the FCC. Back in 2003, the commission received a complaint stating that KXPW-LP broadcast prohibited underwriting announcements, and sent an inquiry to its parent owner.
