= KWLL-FM =

Coordinates: 30.3260°N 92.3557°W

- Rayne, Louisiana; United States
- Broadcast area: Lafayette, Louisiana
- Frequency: 106.7 MHz
- Branding: Cool 106.7

Programming
- Format: Soft oldies

Ownership
- Owner: Broadcast Partners Inc.
- Sister stations: KYBG; KSIG

History
- First air date: 1993 (as KCRL)
- Former call signs: KVTO (1992–1993, CP); KCRL (1993–1997); KSIG-FM (1997–1998); KLTW-FM (1998–2001); KBEB-FM (2001–2008); KKOO (2008–2009); KLEJ (2009–2014); KSIG-FM (2014–2018); KPCZ-FM (2018–2026)

Technical information
- Licensing authority: FCC
- Facility ID: 7054
- Class: A
- ERP: 4,500 watts
- HAAT: 115 meters (377 ft)

Links
- Public license information: Public file; LMS
- Webcast: Listen live
- Website: www.cool1067.net

KWLL-FM (106.7 MHz) is an American radio station licensed to Rayne, Louisiana. It broadcasts to the central Acadiana area, including Lafayette. The station is owned by Broadcast Partners Inc. Its studios are in Crowley and the transmitter is located north of Crowley.

== History ==
KWLL signed on in 1993 with a hit country format as KCRL "Wild 106." Wild 106 lasted until 1996, when the station flipped to a simulcast of KSIG's adult standards format.

KSIG-FM's former classic country format was introduced on October 6, 2014. KPCZ-FM had previously broadcast a Cajun music format since January 2012, which had in turn replaced an earlier classic country format under the station's previous KLEJ call sign. On February 28, 2022, KPCZ-FM rebranded as "Freedom 106.7".

On April 1, 2023, KPCZ-FM dropped its classic country format (which moved to KSIG) and began stunting with nonstop Cajun/Zydeco music by Wayne Toups. On April 3, 2023, KPCZ-FM ended stunting and launched a classic alternative format, branded as "Planet Radio 106.7".

On April 1, 2026, KPCZ-FM dropped the classic alternative format (which moved to Internet radio) and changed to soft oldies, branded as "Cool 106.7" under new KWLL-FM call letters. The "Cool" branding was previously used in the 1990s by KFTE (96.5 FM).
