= KGPZ-LP =

- Grants Pass, Oregon; United States
- Frequency: 106.7 MHz

Programming
- Format: Religious

Ownership
- Owner: SonSong Media; (SonSong Media)

History
- Former call signs: KCGP-LP (2005–2022)

Technical information
- Licensing authority: FCC
- Facility ID: 133956
- Class: L1
- ERP: 70 watts
- HAAT: −44.6 meters (−146 ft)
- Transmitter coordinates: 42°25′22″N 123°23′57″W

Links
- Public license information: LMS

KGPZ-LP (106.7 FM) is a radio station licensed to SongSong Media. The station is currently owned by SonSong Media.

KGPZ-LP can be heard at 106.7 FM in Grants Pass and the surrounding area.
