= KQTY-FM =

Borger, Texas; United States
- Frequency: 106.7 MHz

Programming
- Format: Country
- Affiliations: ABC Radio

Ownership
- Owner: Rick Lee Keefer and David Lansford; (Zia Radio Group LLC)

Technical information
- Licensing authority: FCC
- Facility ID: 74566
- Class: A
- ERP: 6,000 watts
- HAAT: 79.0 meters
- Transmitter coordinates: 35°41′5.00″N 101°23′12.00″W

Links
- Public license information: Public file; LMS

KQTY-FM (106.7 FM) is a radio station broadcasting a country music format. Licensed to Borger, Texas, United States, the station is currently owned by Rick Lee Keefer and David Lansford, through licensee Zia Radio Group LLC, and features local programming from ABC Radio.
