= Cascade High School =

Cascade is a name for several high schools in North America, including:

- Cascade High School (Idaho), Cascade, Idaho
- Cascade High School (Clayton, Indiana)
- Cascade High School (Iowa), Cascade, Iowa
- Cascade High School (Montana), Cascade, Montana
- Cascade Senior High School (Turner, Oregon)
- Cascade High School (Tennessee), Wartrace, Tennessee
- Cascade High School (Leavenworth, Washington), Leavenworth, Washington
- Cascade High School (Everett, Washington)
