= Adrian Pelayo =

Association football player (born 2006)

Personal information
- Date of birth: May 16, 2006 (age 20)
- Place of birth: Marion, Oregon, United States
- Height: 6 ft 1 in (1.85 m)
- Position: Defender

Team information
- Current team: Phoenix Rising FC
- Number: 24

Youth career
- 2023: Portland Timbers
- 2024–2025: C.D. Guadalajara

Senior career*
Years	Team	Apps	(Gls)
2023–2024	North Carolina FC	2	(0)
2025	Vancouver Whitecaps	0	(0)
2025	Whitecaps FC 2	17	(0)
2026–	Phoenix Rising FC	23	(1)

International career^{‡}
2023	United States U17	0	(0)
2023	Mexico U17	1	(0)
- * Club domestic league appearances and goals as of 20:10, 10 November 2026 (UTC) ‡ National team caps and goals as of November 12, 2023

Adrian Pelayo (born May 16, 2006) is a professional footballer who plays as a defender for Phoenix Rising FC in the USL Championship. Born in Marion, Oregon, he has represented Mexico at youth levels.

== Club career ==
=== Youth ===
Pelayo played for the Portland Timbers academy, and even got to play a game for the first team in preseason.

Pelayo joined the Guadalajara U-23s in July 2024.

=== Professional ===
On September 28, 2023, Pelayo signed his first professional contract with North Carolina FC in USL League One. He never made an appearance in USL League One as North Carolina moved up to the USL Championship. He made his debut in the 3–1 loss Loudoun United FC, almost playing the whole game. He played his first 90 minutes in the U.S. Open Cup game against Carolina Core FC.

On April 19, 2025, Pelayo signed with Whitecaps FC 2, the MLS Next Pro reserve side of the Vancouver Whitecaps. He was an unused substitute in the Vancouver Whitecaps's 3–0 win over Seattle Sounders.

In December, 2025, Phoenix Rising FC announced they had signed Pelayo to a multi-year contract ahead of the 2026 USL Championship season.

== International career ==
=== Youth ===
Pelayo was called up to a United States under-17 national team camp in April 2023 in preparation for the World Cup. However, he was including in the World Cup squad for the Mexico under-17 national team. Pelayo's team was knocked out in the Round of 16 by Mali.
