= Santiam =

Santiam is a place name of the U.S. state of Oregon, referring to the indigenous Santiam people. It may refer to:

- Santiam Academy
- Santiam Hospital
- Santiam Junction, Oregon
- Santiam Junction State Airport
- Santiam Pass
- Santiam River
- Santiam State Forest
