= Cascade School District (Oregon) =

Public school district in Oregon, US

Cascade School District, Oregon

Address
- 10226 Marion Road SE Turner, Oregon, 97392; United States
- Coordinates: 44°48′32″N 122°54′57″W

District information
- Type: Public
- Grades: K-12
- Superintendent: Darin Drill
- Chair of the board: Brett Stegall
- Schools: 3 Elementary, 1 Junior High, 1 High, 1 Alternate
- NCES District ID: 4102780

Students and staff
- Students: 2,290
- Teachers: 126
- Student–teacher ratio: 18:1

Other information
- Website: www.cascade.k12.or.us

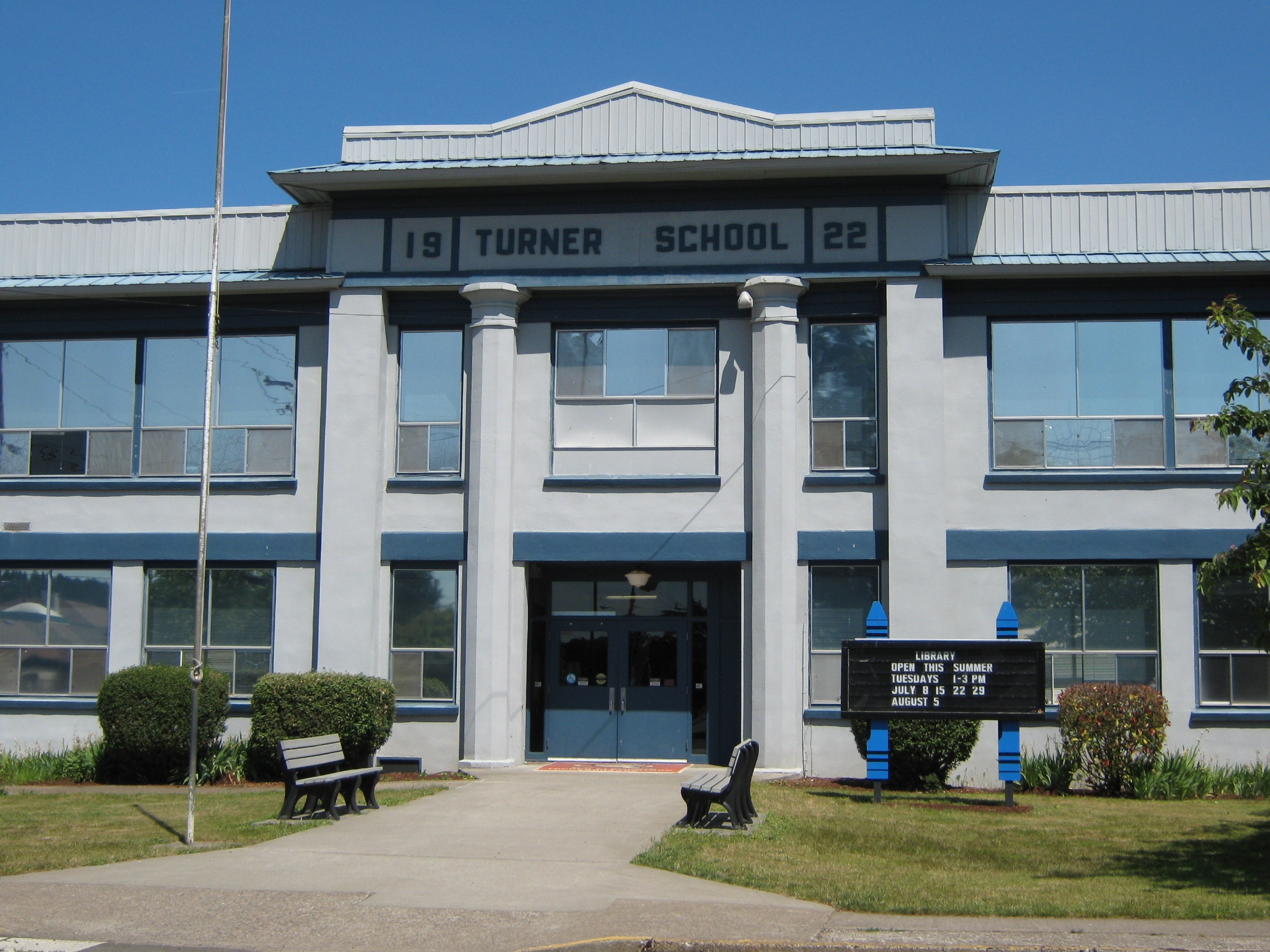
Turner Elementary School in Turner

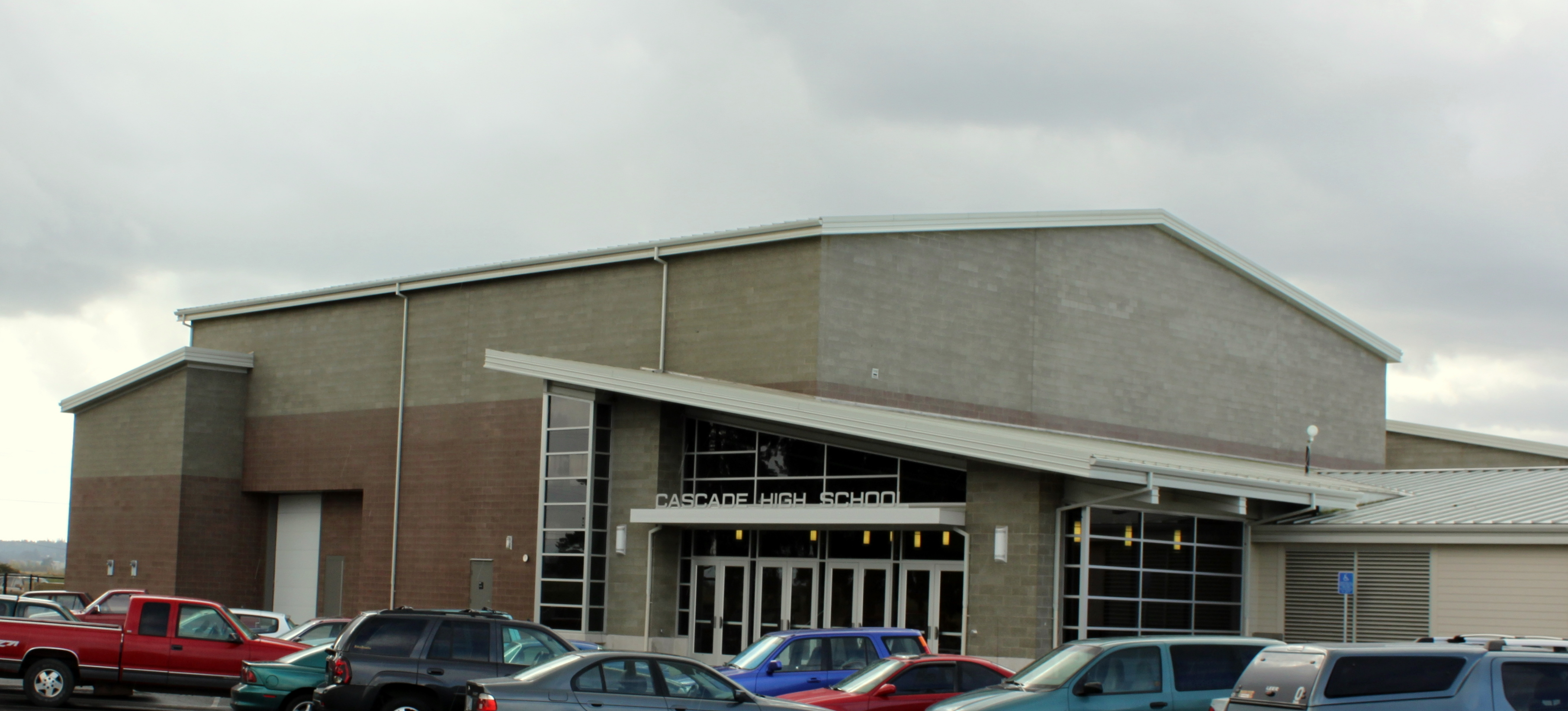
Cascade High School

Cascade School District #5 (Cascade SD 5) is a public school district in Oregon, based in an unincorporated area with a Turner postal address. The school district administration is on the same property as Cascade Junior High School and Cascade High School.

The district's service area includes Turner, Aumsville, Marion, and a small portion of Salem.

It includes five schools, the three elementary schools Turner elementary, Aumsville elementary, and Cloverdale elementary. Then all the elementary schools merge at Cascade Junior High which those students go to the larger Cascade High. The Senior high has a symphonic, marching, and jazz band. The junior high has a beginning and 7th/8th grade band.
