= Ryan Thompson (pitcher) =

American baseball player (born 1992)

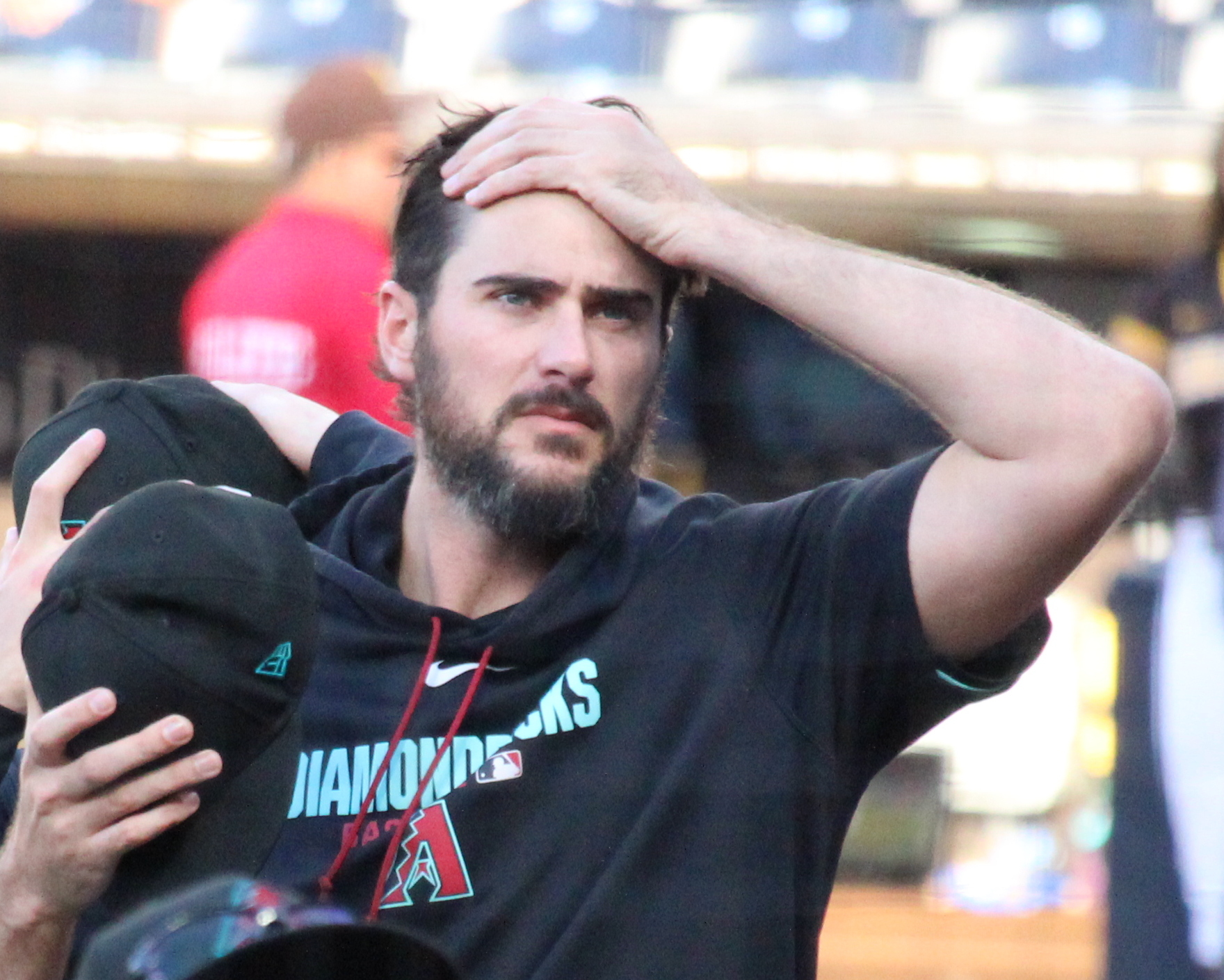
- Thompson with the Diamondbacks in 2026

Free agent
- Pitcher
- Born: June 26, 1992 (age 34); Turner, Oregon, U.S.
- Bats: Right Throws: Right

MLB debut
- July 24, 2020, for the Tampa Bay Rays

MLB statistics (through 2026 season)
- Win–loss record: 22–18
- Earned run average: 3.67
- Strikeouts: 237
- Stats at Baseball Reference

Teams
- Tampa Bay Rays (2020–2023); Arizona Diamondbacks (2023–2026)

Ryan Scott Thompson (born June 26, 1992) is an American professional baseball pitcher who is a free agent. He has played in Major League Baseball (MLB) for the Tampa Bay Rays and Arizona Diamondbacks. Thompson is a submarine-style pitcher.

== Career ==
=== Amateur career ===
Thompson attended Cascade High School in Turner, Oregon and played college baseball at Chemeketa Community College and Campbell University. In 2013, he briefly played collegiate summer baseball for the Hyannis Harbor Hawks of the Cape Cod Baseball League.

=== Houston Astros ===
The Houston Astros selected Thompson in the 23rd round of the 2014 Major League Baseball draft. He made his professional debut with the Low-A Tri-City ValleyCats, posting a 2.96 ERA in 23 appearances. In 2015, Thompson pitched for the Single-A Quad Cities River Bandits and the High-A Lancaster JetHawks, registering a 3.00 ERA with 60 strikeouts in 43 total appearances. The following season, Thompson split the year between Lancaster and the Double-A Corpus Christi Hooks, recording a 3.35 ERA with 65 strikeouts in another 43 appearances. In 2017, Thompson played for Corpus Christi and the Triple-A Fresno Grizzlies, logging a 4.05 ERA with 61 strikeouts in 66 2/3 innings pitched across 37 games. Thompson missed the entire 2018 season due to injury.

=== Tampa Bay Rays ===
The Tampa Bay Rays selected Thompson in the minor league phase of the Rule 5 draft on December 13, 2018. Thompson spent the 2019 season with the High-A Charlotte Stone Crabs and the Double-A Montgomery Biscuits, recording a 2.70 ERA in 16 games between the two teams.

Thompson made the Rays' Opening Day roster in 2020. On July 24, 2020, he made his MLB debut. In his debut campaign, Thompson was 1–2 with one save and a 4.44 ERA. In 2021, Thompson was shut down in late June due to right shoulder inflammation, and was later placed on the 60-day injured list on August 3. On September 24, 2021, it was announced that Thompson would undergo surgery to address thoracic outlet syndrome. He finished the year with a 2.38 ERA in 36 appearances.

On June 4, 2022, Thompson, along with four other Rays teammates, opted out of wearing a Rays team logo and cap in support of LGBTQ+ Pride, during the team's annual Pride Night celebration at Tropicana Field. In 47 games for the team in 2022, he posted a 3.80 ERA with 39 strikeouts and three saves in 42 2/3 innings pitched.

Thompson made 18 appearances for the Rays in 2023, struggling to a 6.11 ERA with 12 strikeouts in 17 2/3 innings pitched. On August 16, 2023, Thompson was designated for assignment following the promotion of Héctor Pérez. Thompson was released by the Rays the next day, after clearing waivers.

=== Arizona Diamondbacks ===
On August 19, 2023, Thompson signed a minor league contract with the Arizona Diamondbacks organization. After two scoreless appearances for the Triple–A Reno Aces, the Diamondbacks selected Thompson's contract to the major league roster on August 27.

On August 5, 2026, Thompson was placed on the injured list due to a lower–back strain. He had posted a 4–2 record and 4.43 ERA with 29 strikeouts in 46 appearances prior to the injury. On September 1, Thompson was transferred to the 60–day injured list, officially ending his season.

== See also ==
- Rule 5 draft results
