= Enchanted Forest (Oregon) =

Amusement park in Turner, Oregon, U.S.

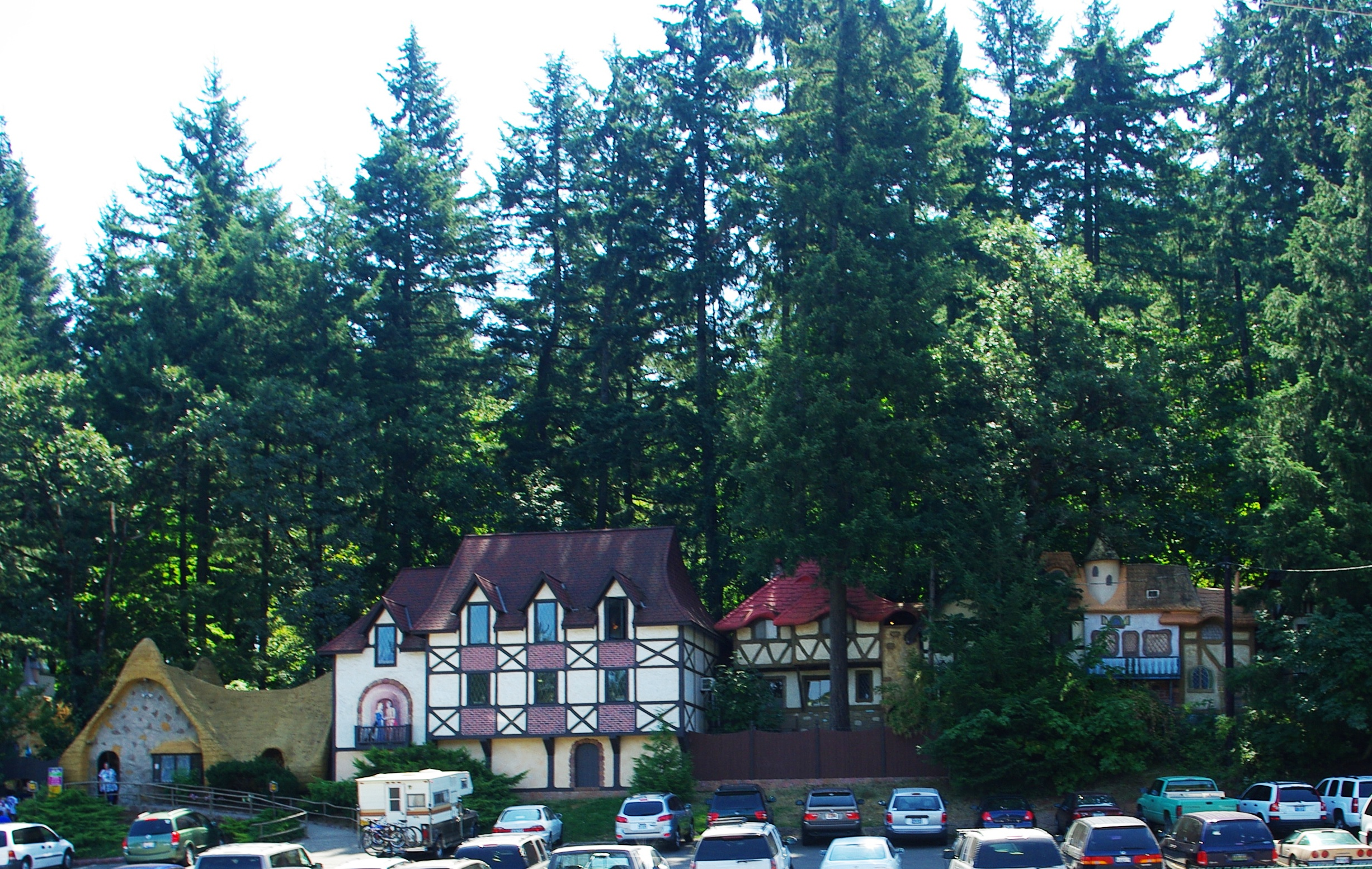
- Enchanted Forest entrance
- Interactive map of Enchanted Forest
- Location: 8462 Enchanted Way SE, Turner, Oregon, United States
- Coordinates: 44.833085°N 123.008249°W
- Opened: August 8, 1971; 55 years ago
- Owner: Tofte family
- Area: 20 acres (8.1 ha)

Attractions
- Total: 10
- Roller coasters: 2
- Water rides: 1 (Note: Big Timber Log Ride is classified as both a roller coaster and water ride)
- Website: www.enchantedforest.com

Enchanted Forest is a seasonal theme park located in Turner, Oregon, United States, 7 miles (11 km) south of Salem. Situated on a patch of hilly wooded land next to Interstate 5, the park was created and hand-built by Roger Tofte over a period of seven years in the late 1960s, and first opened to the public in 1971. Early success led to many expansions over the last half-century, mostly built again by Tofte by hand.

It features an assortment of attractions, including a Storybook Lane that features multiple sculptures and walkthrough displays based on fairy tales, nursery rhymes, and children's literature. The park's layout incorporates several other themed areas, such as an Old West-themed main street, and an Old European Village. The park features a number of small rides, as well as a bobsled-themed rollercoaster, a hybrid log flume–rollercoaster, a walkthrough haunted house, and an interactive dark ride. Additionally, the park features original live children's theater performances and music.

The Tofte family still owns and operates the 20-acre (8.1 ha) park, with three generations of the family involved in the day-to-day operations.

== History ==
=== 1964–1970: Development ===
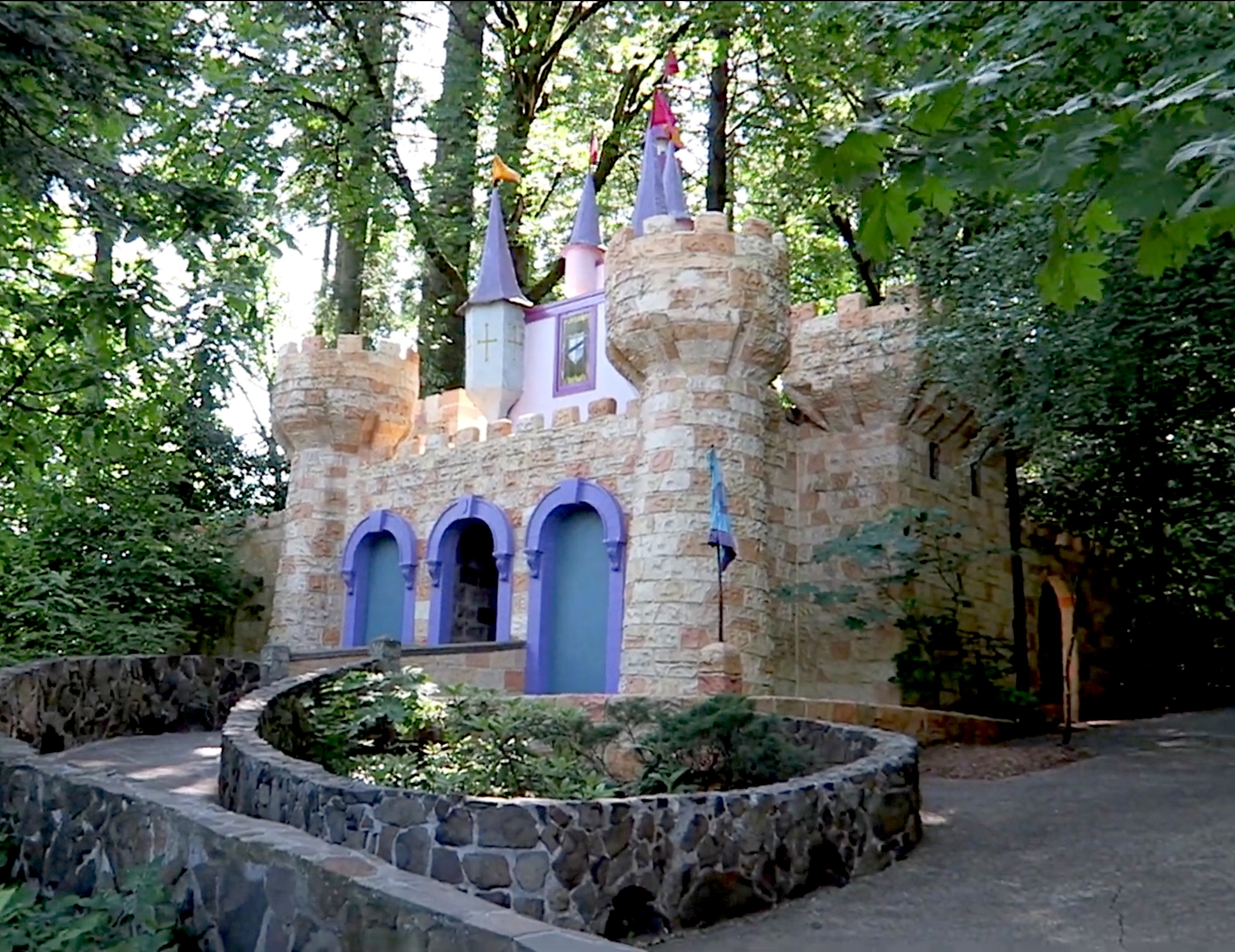
The Enchanted Castle at the park entrance

Enchanted Forest was founded and constructed by Roger Tofte (January 8, 1930 – February 13, 2026). Born in Chippewa Falls, Wisconsin, Tofte moved with his family to Astoria, Oregon at age five, before they settled in Silverton in the Willamette Valley.

In 1964, Tofte purchased 20 acres (8.1 ha) of land in Turner, Oregon for US$4,000 (equivalent to $41,524 in 2025), money he had earned repairing watches and working as a highway draftsman for the Oregon State Highway Division. The project was anticipated by Tofte to take two years, but due to lack of funds, zoning, and poor weather, as well as Tofte's vision of the park expanding, the initial construction ultimately took seven years.

Tofte retained his job while building Enchanted Forest, only working on the project in his free time. Tofte built many of the park's structures himself, including all of the initial structures along the Storybook Lane, mentioning he created any cement structures using a rebar frame cover covered with metal lath, upon which he sculpted cement. Tofte repurposed lumber from the cleared trees to create guardrails for the pathways. "I'm trying to stay away from the carnival and commercialized atmosphere," he said. "I want real quality—nothing just slapped together."

=== 1971–1999: Early years and expansion ===
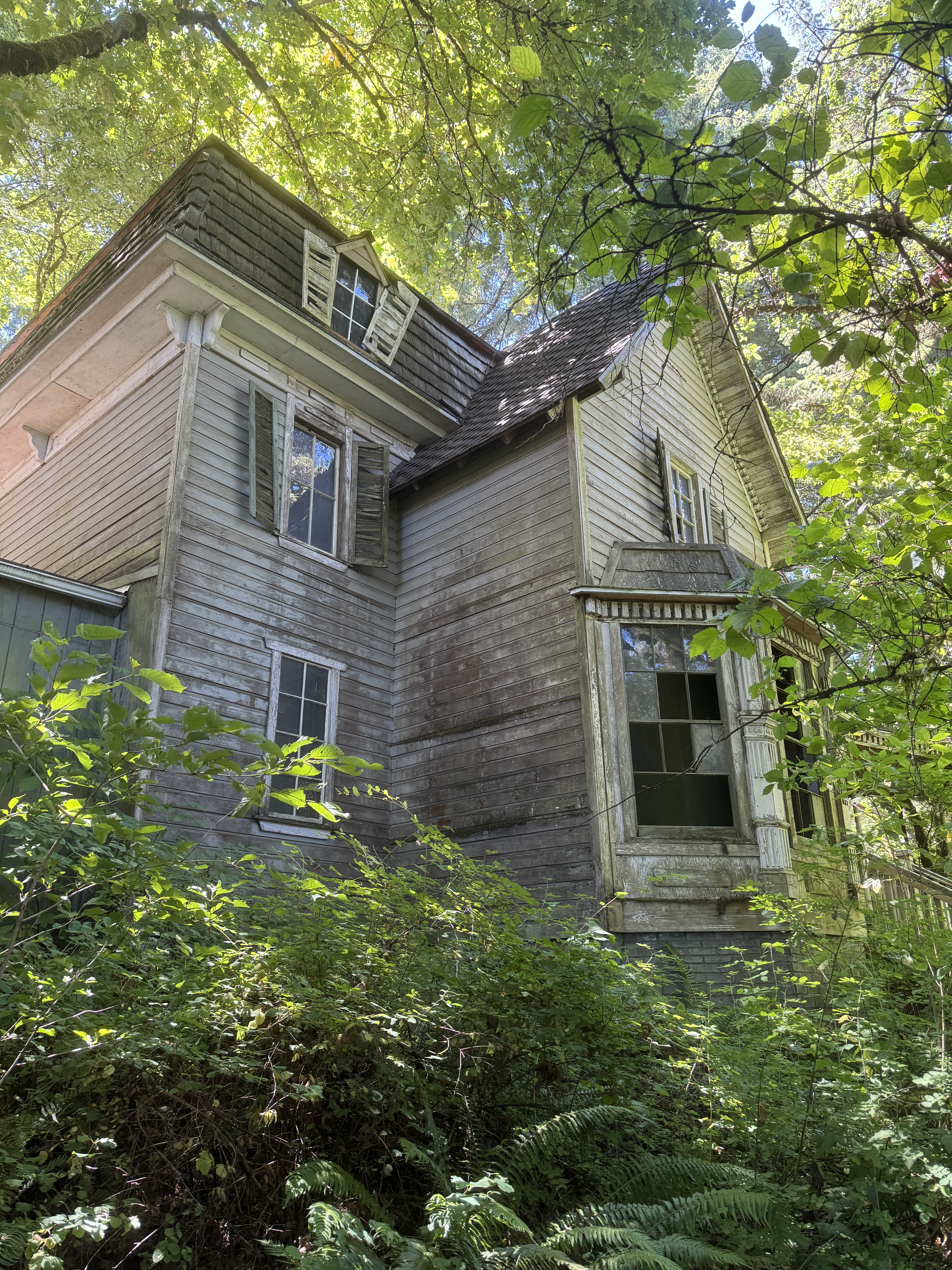
The Haunted House attraction opened in 1975

Shortly before the park's opening in 1971, Tofte and his wife, Mavis, secured a $2,000 loan to purchase souvenirs for park patrons. The park officially opened to guests on August 8, 1971. At the time, it consisted solely of the Storybook Lane, a .25 miles (0.40 km) trail featuring various sculptures and walkthrough exhibits themed around fairy tales and nursery rhymes. Its first season ran from August 8 until mid-October 1971.

After the conclusion of the park's first season, Tofte began construction of Tofteville, a new section themed after an Old West mining town. This section opened in 1974 in the park's third season 1974, during which it earned an estimated $200,000. In May 1975, the Haunted House attraction opened in an attempt to appeal to older children and adolescents, and cost approximately $20,000 to build.

The Ice Mountain Bobsled, a bobsled-themed rollercoaster built around an icy mountain peak, opened in 1982. The rollercoaster was originally built with trains which ran along a 24-inch-wide (61 cm) fiberglass track, which was converted to a traditional steel tubular track in 1985. Development of the Old European Village, a Renaissance-style village section, began shortly after in the mid-1980s, debuting with the opening of the Fantasy Fountains, a light and water show housed in the Jolly Roger Inn dining hall.

In 1990, the Ice Mountain Bobsled was damaged during a winter storm which caused multiple trees to fall in the park.

The Big Timber Log Ride, a log flume and rollercoaster hybrid designed by the Portland, Oregon-based E&F Miler Industries, opened in the spring of 1997. Constructed at a cost of $2 million, it marked the park's most expensive project to date.

=== 2000–present ===
In 2006, the Challenge of Mondor, a trackless interactive dark ride featuring a wizard, dragons, and monsters, was opened. The ride was designed by the Dutch ETF Ride Systems and the United States-based Sally Corporation.

The original 1971 Humpty Dumpty display was damaged in July 2014 and was replaced the following month with a new sculpture of the character.

Before 2020, the park averaged 200,000 visitors per year. The park struggled financially during COVID, and crowd-funded $360,000.

Park founder Roger Tofte died in February 2026. The business is managed by Tofte's two daughters.

== Park layout and design ==
The park is divided into various areas that the park classifies as attractions.

=== Storybook Lane ===
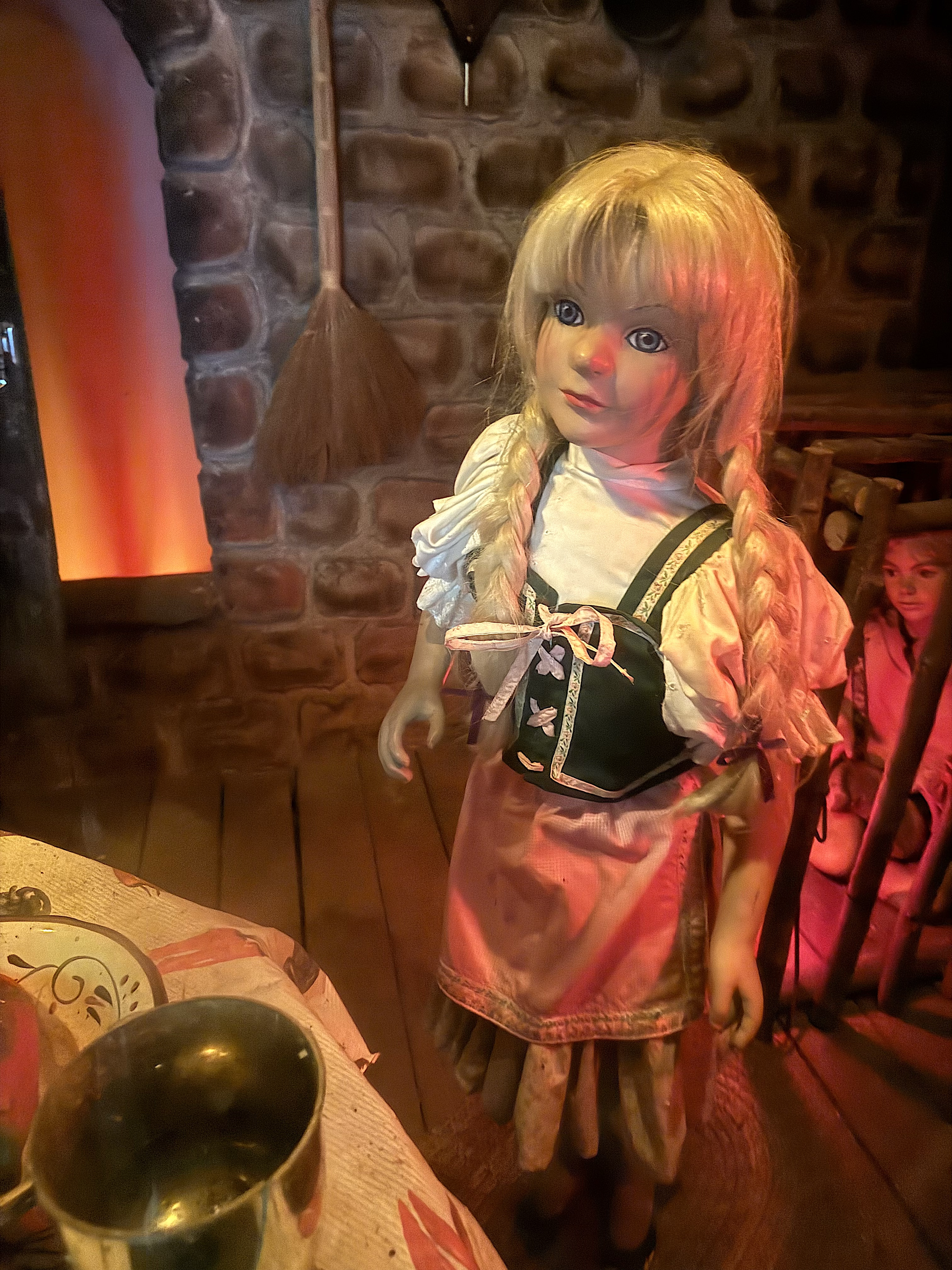
"Hansel and Gretel" display in Storybook Lane

The park initially opened with just the Storybook Lane section in 1971 before numerous additions were made in the ensuing years. The Storybook Lane features numerous exhibits, sculptures, and structures based on fairy tales, nursery rhymes, and classic children's literature. The original sculptures and structures were built using concrete, fiberglass, and plaster of paris. Guests enter the Storybook Lane through a castle at the park entrance, followed by pathways featuring sculptures and displays based on "Humpty Dumpty", "Little Miss Muffet", "Goldilocks and the Three Bears", "Jack and Jill", "Peter, Peter, Pumpkin Eater", and "Mary Had a Little Lamb", and Mother Goose.

Also featured are a life-sized rabbit hole and wooden maze based on Alice's Adventures in Wonderland; a walkthrough gingerbread house based on "Hansel and Gretel"; a walkthrough mine tunnel and display based on "Snow White"; a walkthrough witch's house featuring a slide; and a large shoe with a dual-lane slide based on "There Was an Old Woman Who Lived in a Shoe".

=== Tofteville Western Town ===
The Tofteville Western Town, which opened in 1974, features a main street modeled after an Old West frontier town. Tofteville is home to western-themed storefront and window displays of old western characters. Also located in Toftefille are two gift shops: the General Store and the Opera House, the latter of which also houses a small museum about the park's history. This section of the park is also home to a treasure panning station as well as the Comedy Theatre, which began in 1973 and holds original productions written and directed by Roger Tofte's daughter, Susan Vaslev.

Located on the edge of Tofteville is the park's Haunted House, a walkthrough Victorian-style haunted house attraction which opened in May 1975.

=== Old European Village ===
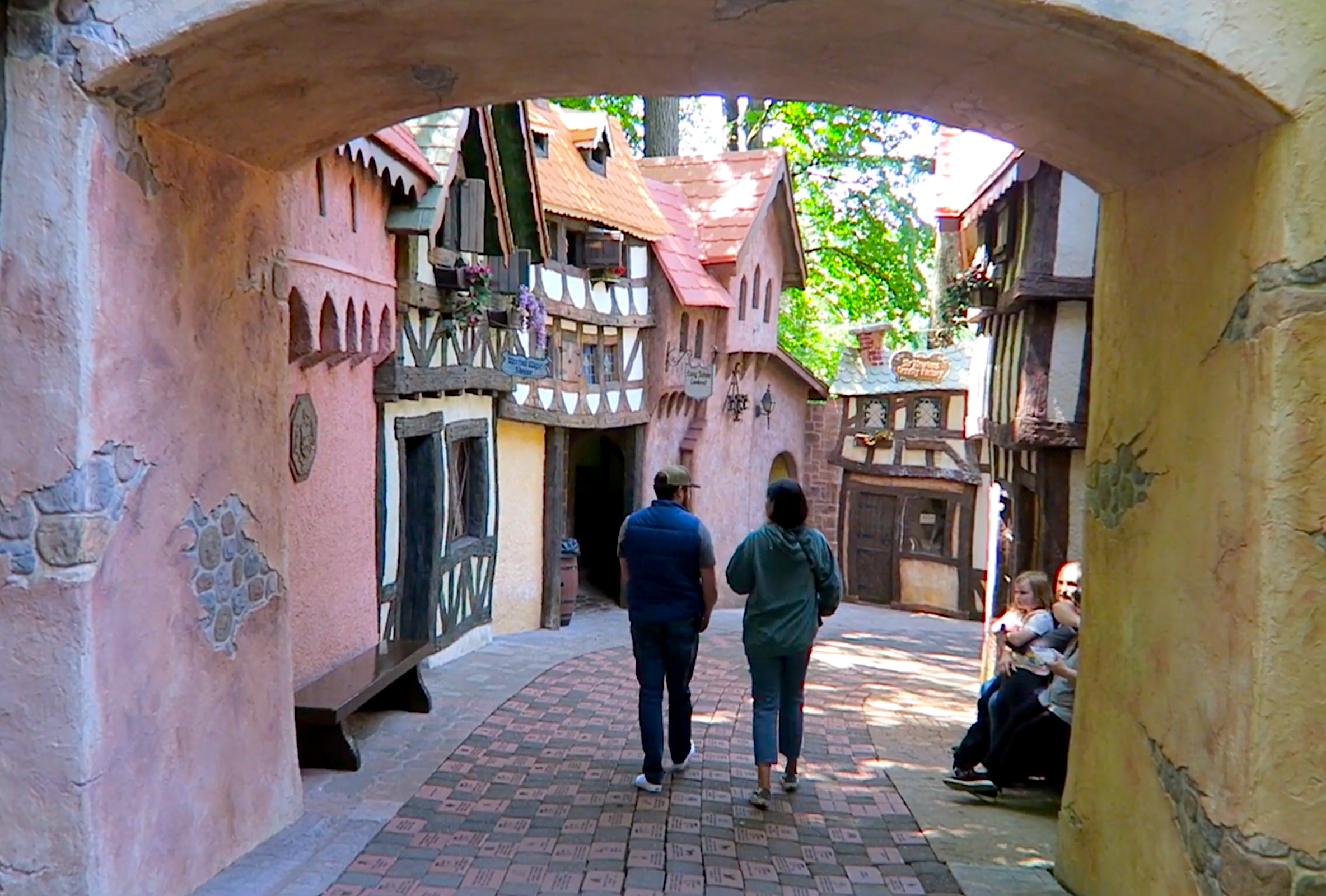
Street scene in the Old European Village

The Old European Village (Note: This section of the park was originally referred to as the Olde World Village.) features a cobblestone street and is modeled after a Renaissance village. The first phase of this section opened in the spring of 1988 with the Fantasy Fountains, a musical water and light show housed in the Jolly Roger Inn, an English-style dining hall. The Old European Village was completed in 1992.

It also features themed walkthrough attractions themed around Pinocchio; Merlin's Magic Shop; a kaleidoscope; Sir Newton's Gravity Factory; and the Blackbird Bakery, an animatronic singing blackbird exhibit. Also located in the Old European Village is the Gathering Hall, a small musical venue that hosts Possibly Irish, an Irish music band that performs scheduled family-friendly musical performances.

The Challenge of Mondor, a trackless interactive fantasy-themed dark ride, was added to the Old European Village in 2006.

=== Kiddy Land ===
Kiddy Land is a midway featuring several rides designed for younger children, including bumper boats, bumper cars, and a small ferris wheel, among others. Near Kiddy Land is the Summer Comedy Theater, which showcases original musical plays based on classic fairy tales, written by Susan Vaslev. A carousel was added adjacent to Kiddy Land in 2017.

== Attractions ==
=== Rides ===
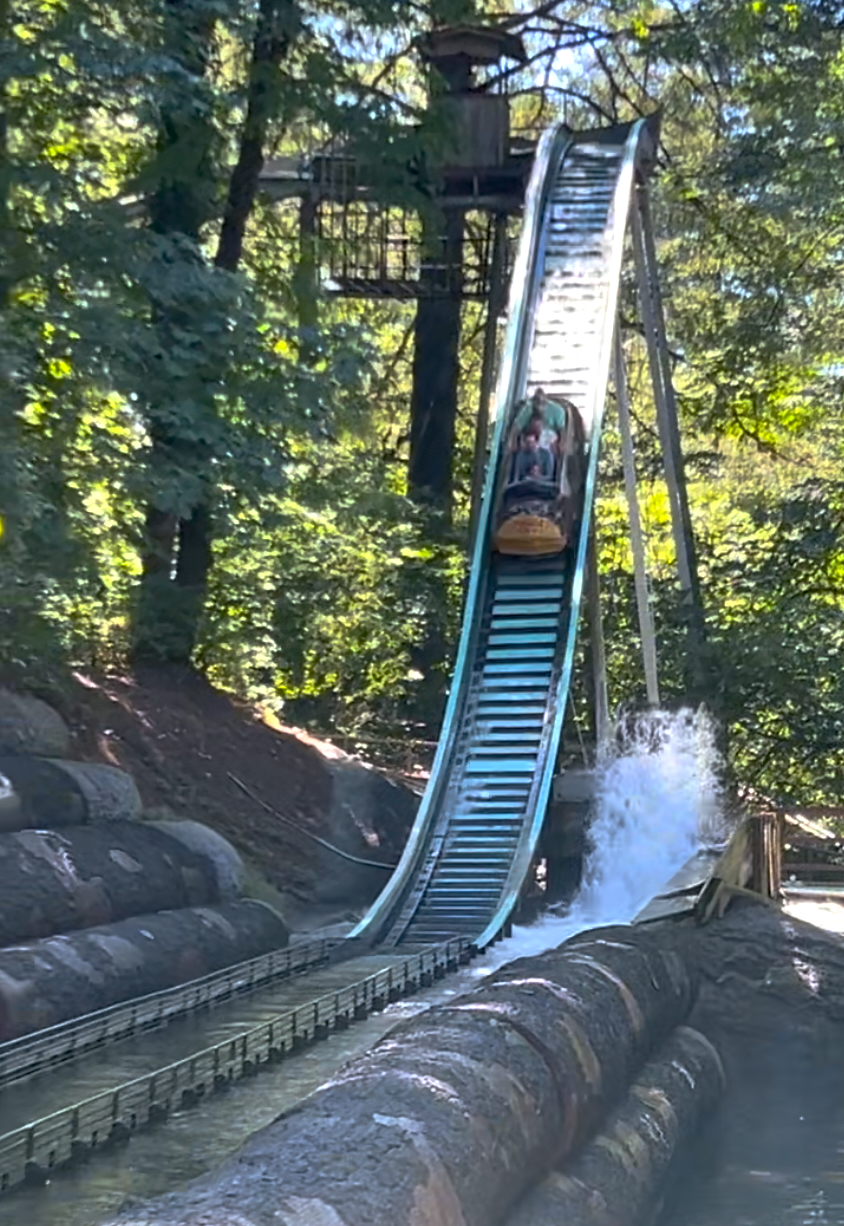
Big Timber Log Ride

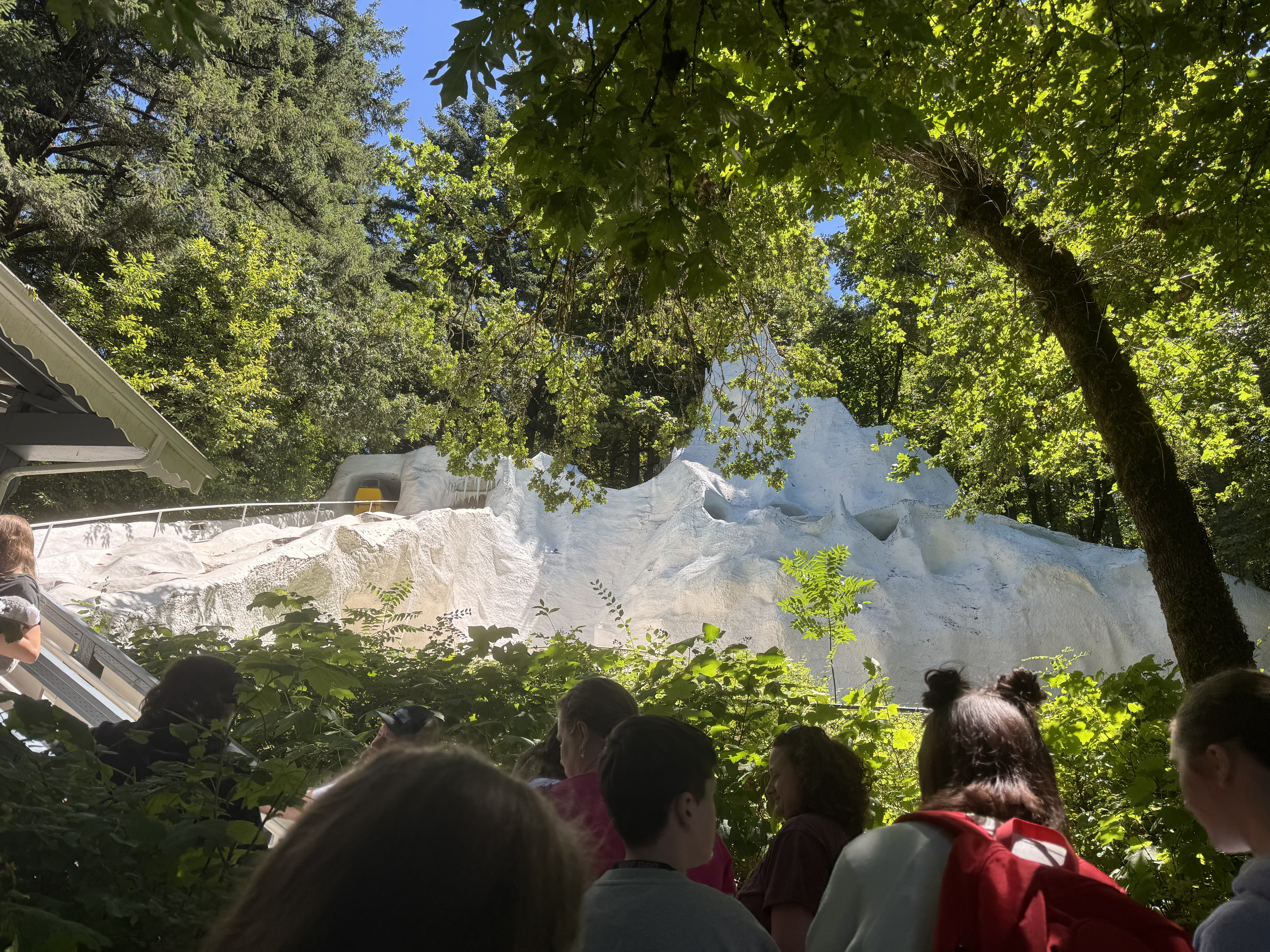
Ice Mountain Bobsled

Ride	Opened	Manufacturer	Description	Ref.
Big Timber Log Ride	1997	E&F Miler Industries	A log flume and roller coaster hybrid ride, themed to a lumber mill. Features a roller coaster section and a 40-foot (12 m) drop into a splashdown. It is the largest ride of its kind in the Pacific Northwest.	
Carousel	2017		A carousel featuring horses, ostriches, bunnies, and a pig.	
Challenge of Mondor	2006	ETF Ride Systems; Sally Corporation	A trackless shooting dark ride. Passengers participate in a quest from a wizard, Mondor, which requires them to shoot at targets.	
The Haunted House	1975	Enchanted Forest	A walkthrough attraction themed to a haunted house. (Note: Though a walkthrough attraction, the Haunted House is classified and ticketed as a ride.)	
Ice Mountain Bobsled	1982	Ascot Design and Development	A roller coaster with enclosed cars that begins in an icy mountain. Originally built with trains which ran along a 24-inch-wide (61 cm) fiberglass track, the ride was modified in 1985 to use traditional steel tubular track. The ride stands 100 feet (30 m) tall at its peak.	
Kiddy Bumper Boats			A bumper boats ride aimed at a young demographic.	
Kiddy Frog Hopper			A 20-foot-tall (6.1 m) drop ride aimed at a young demographic.	
Speedway Bumper Cars	2007		A bumper cars ride.	
Tiny Tune Train	2007		A train ride around themed sculptures.	
Up and Away Ferris Wheel			A Ferris wheel-like ride featuring hot air balloon-themed cars; aimed at a young demographic.	

=== Non-ride attractions ===
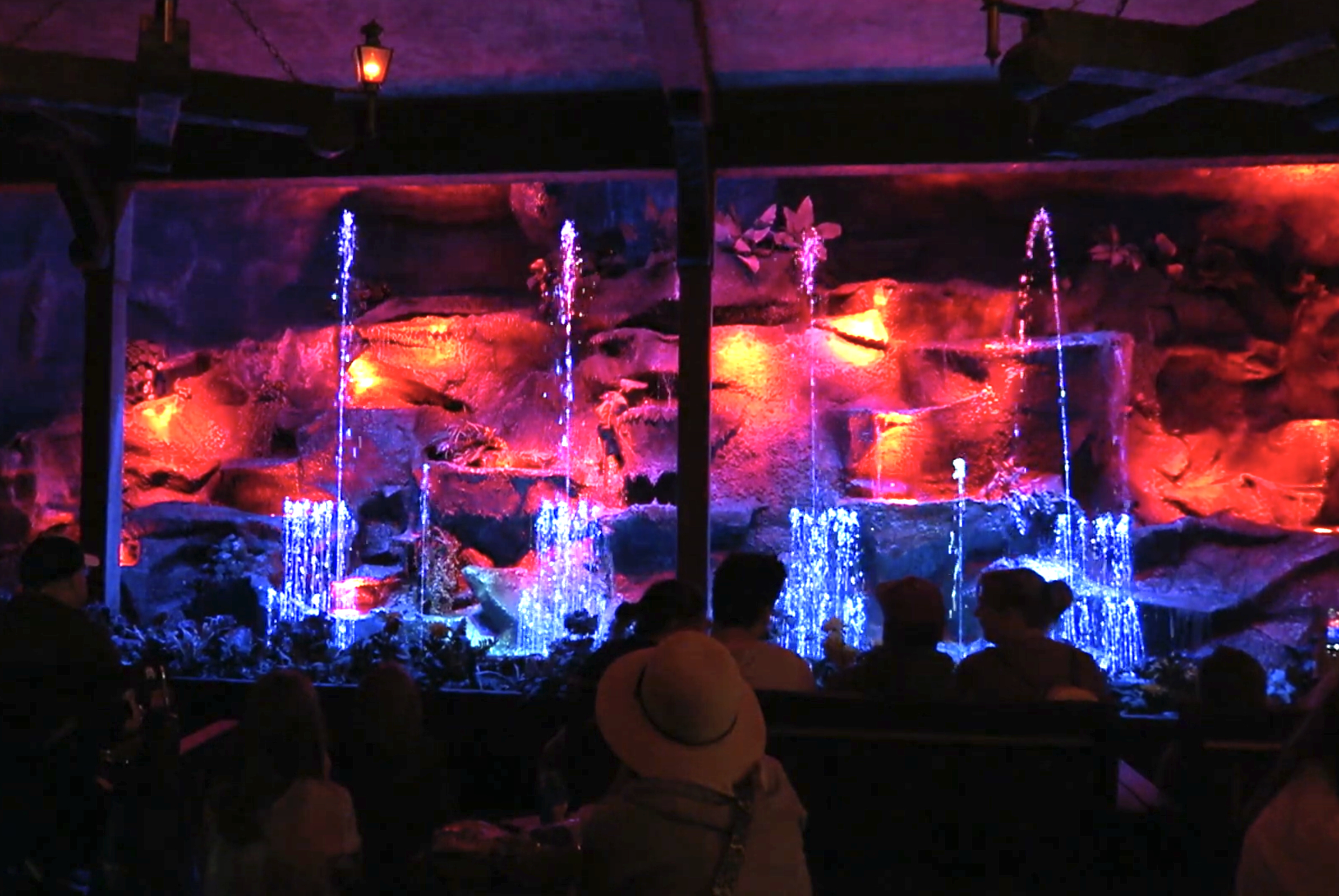
The Fantasy Fountains light and water show

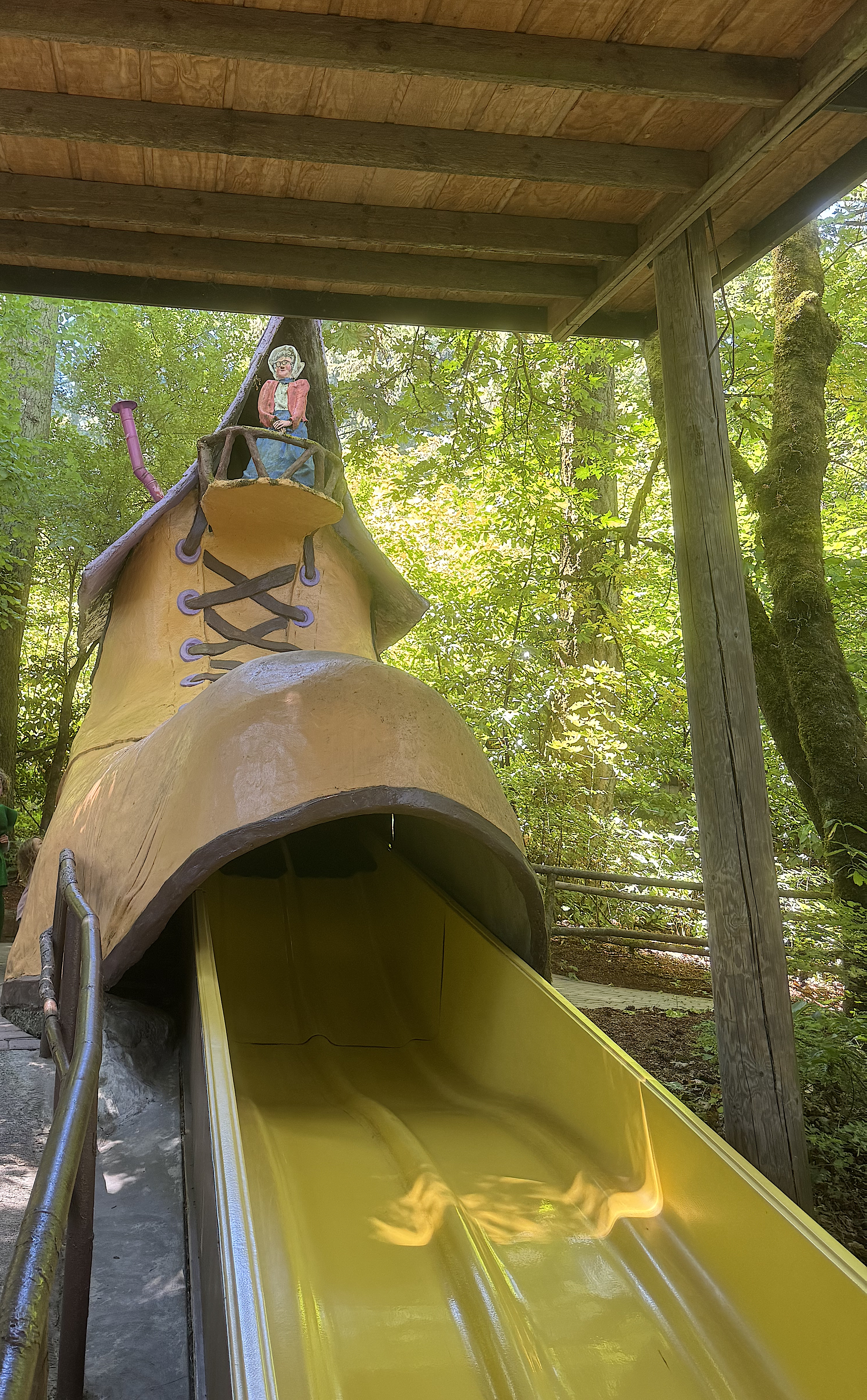
The Old Lady Who Lived In a Shoe slide

Attraction	Description	Ref.
Blackbird Bakery	A large musical animatronic exhibit featuring a singing blackbird in a blackberry pie.	
The Crooked Man's House	A walkthrough house featuring disorienting sloped floors and walls, based on "There Was a Crooked Man".	
Enchanted Castle	A castle with passageways, a dungeon, and moat, situated at the park's entrance.	
Fantasy Fountains	A musical light and water show housed in the Jolly Roger Inn dining hall.	
Fort Fearless	An Old West-themed attraction featuring a shooting gallery.	
Geppetto's Workshop	A walkthrough workshop based on the Geppetto character in The Adventures of Pinocchio.	
Gingerbread House	A walkthrough gingerbread house based on "Hansel and Gretel".	
Mad Hatter's Maze	A wooden walkthrough maze themed around the Mad Hatter in Alice's Adventures in Wonderland.	
Old Lady Who Lived In The Shoe Slide	A dual-lane fun slide that begins inside a large shoe, based on "There Was an Old Woman Who Lived in a Shoe".	
Pinocchio's Playroom	A walkthrough attraction themed around The Adventures of Pinocchio.	
Rabbit Hole	A tunnel guests are able to crawl through, based on the White Rabbit's rabbit hole in Alice's Adventures in Wonderland.	
The Seven Dwarves' Mine	A walkthrough mine attraction based on the Seven Dwarfs mine in "Snow White".	
Sir Newton's Gravity Factory	An interactive kinetic rolling ball sculpture demonstrating Isaac Newton's law of universal gravitation.	
The Witch's Head	A walkthrough structure resembling a large witch's head, based on the witch in "Snow White". Guests enter via her mouth and can exit using a slide that runs down her hair.	

== Park schedule ==
The park is open on a seasonal schedule: opening in late March, weekends only in April, daily from May to Labor Day, and then weekends only through September.

Due to the COVID-19 pandemic, the park did not adhere to its usual schedule for the 2020 season. The park was able to open daily with reduced capacity beginning June 26 with COVID-19 safety practices in place.

== In media ==
The park was featured in a 2018 episode of the series Ghost Adventures.

In March of 2024, the park was voted Newsweek's readers' choice "Best Family-Owned Amusement Park" in the country.
