= Stayton, Oregon =

- City
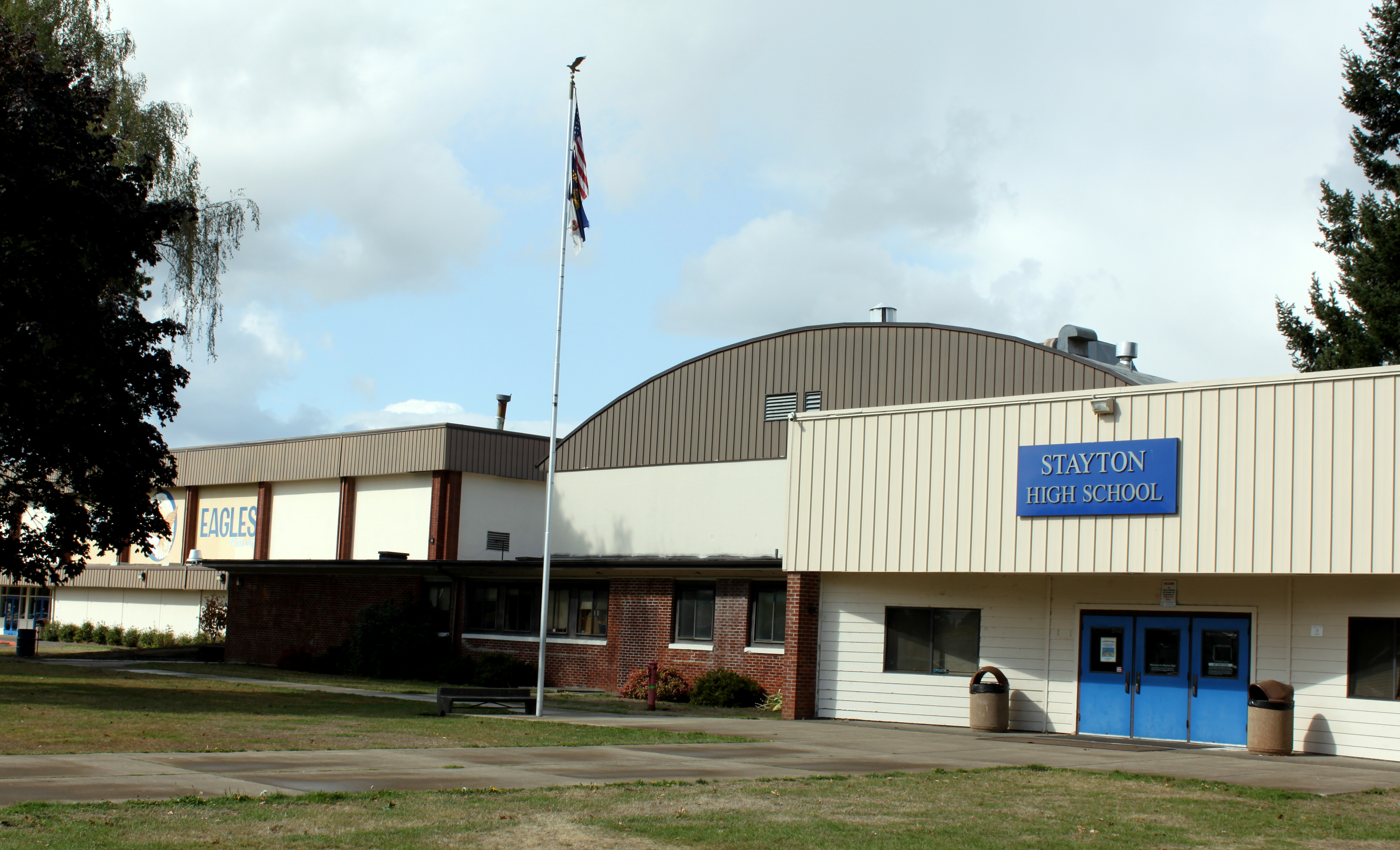
- Stayton High School

- Seal

- Location in Oregon
- Coordinates: 44°48′12″N 122°47′54″W
- Country: United States
- State: Oregon
- County: Marion
- Incorporated: 1891

Government
  - Mayor: Steve Sims (interim)

Area
  - Total: 3.11 sq mi (8.05 km^{2})
  - Land: 3.09 sq mi (8.01 km^{2})
  - Water: 0.015 sq mi (0.04 km^{2})
- Elevation: 456 ft (139 m)

Population (2020)
  - Total: 8,244
  - Density: 2,665.9/sq mi (1,029.32/km^{2})
- Time zone: UTC-8 (Pacific)
  - Summer (DST): UTC-7 (Pacific)
- ZIP Code: 97383
- Area codes: 503 and 971
- FIPS code: 41-70200
- GNIS feature ID: 2411975
- Website: www.staytonoregon.gov

Stayton is a city in Marion County, Oregon, United States, located 16 miles (26 km) southeast of the state capital, Salem, on Oregon Route 22. It is south of Sublimity and southeast of Aumsville. Located on the North Santiam River, Stayton is a regional agricultural and light manufacturing center. The population was 8,244 at the 2020 census. Established in 1872, it was incorporated in 1891. Stayton is part of the Salem Metropolitan Statistical Area.

== History ==
Stayton was founded by Drury Smith Stayton, who purchased the town site in 1866 and built a carding mill and sawmill on a watercourse of the North Santiam River. In 1872, he platted the town site, and that same year the community received a post office. A ferry crossing of the Santiam River operated from 1876 until a bridge was constructed in 1888. By 1880, a laundry had been established by Kee Sing and Tom. The first newspaper, The Stayton Sun, was published in 1889 by T. H. McGill.

The founder of Stayton, Drury Stayton, originally wanted to name the city after his daughter, Florence Stayton. After his petition was denied by the post office because another city in Oregon was named Florence, he chose Stayton and named a street after his daughter. The city was incorporated as the Town of Stayton in 1891 after a failed attempt in 1884.

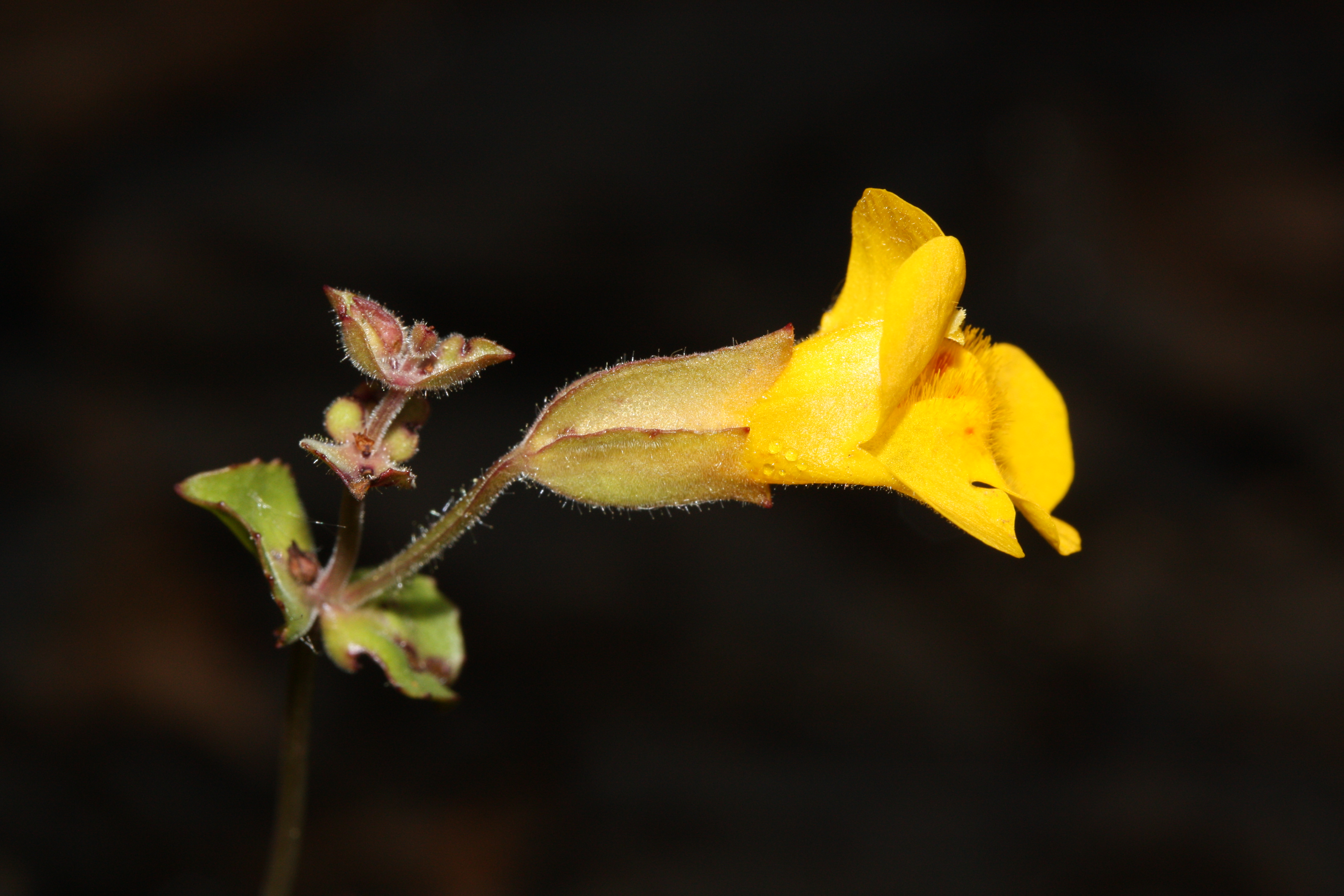
Seep monkeyflower (Mimulus guttatus) is among the species protected in Kingston Prairie Preserve near Stayton.

== Geography ==
According to the United States Census Bureau, the city has a total area of 3.14 square miles (8.13 km^{2}), of which 3.12 square miles (8.08 km^{2}) are land and 0.02 square miles (0.05 km^{2}), or 0.48%, are water.

=== Climate ===
Stayton experiences a temperate climate that is usually described as oceanic with mild, damp winters and relatively dry, warm summers, like most of the Pacific Northwest.

Summers in Stayton are warm and relatively sunny but can, on occasion, be wet. The warmest month is August with a daytime average of 80.8 °F (27.1 °C) and an average low of 51 °F (10.6 °C). Because of its inland location, Stayton can experience heat waves, in July and August particularly, with air temperatures sometimes rising over 90 °F (32 °C).

Winters are described as somewhat mild and very wet. Cold snaps can occur and last for several days, and snowfall occurs a few times throughout the winter season; the city has been known to see major snow and ice storms. Spring can bring rather unpredictable weather, resulting from brief warm spells, to thunderstorms rolling off the Cascade Range.

The lowest temperature ever recorded in Stayton was −7 °F (−22 °C), on December 8, 1972. According to the Köppen Climate Classification system, Stayton has a warm-summer Mediterranean climate, abbreviated "Csb" on climate maps.

Climate data for Stayton, Oregon (1991–2020 normals, extremes 1957–present)
Month	Jan	Feb	Mar	Apr	May	Jun	Jul	Aug	Sep	Oct	Nov	Dec	Year
Record high °F (°C)	69 (21)	72 (22)	82 (28)	86 (30)	98 (37)	113 (45)	105 (41)	106 (41)	102 (39)	91 (33)	76 (24)	66 (19)	113 (45)
Mean maximum °F (°C)	59.1 (15.1)	61.3 (16.3)	69.0 (20.6)	76.5 (24.7)	84.9 (29.4)	89.3 (31.8)	94.9 (34.9)	95.4 (35.2)	90.3 (32.4)	77.6 (25.3)	63.5 (17.5)	58.7 (14.8)	98.5 (36.9)
Mean daily maximum °F (°C)	46.9 (8.3)	50.6 (10.3)	55.2 (12.9)	60.2 (15.7)	67.0 (19.4)	72.8 (22.7)	80.8 (27.1)	81.0 (27.2)	75.4 (24.1)	63.3 (17.4)	52.1 (11.2)	46.0 (7.8)	62.6 (17.0)
Daily mean °F (°C)	40.6 (4.8)	42.7 (5.9)	46.2 (7.9)	50.5 (10.3)	56.4 (13.6)	61.5 (16.4)	67.2 (19.6)	67.1 (19.5)	62.4 (16.9)	53.3 (11.8)	45.2 (7.3)	40.1 (4.5)	52.8 (11.6)
Mean daily minimum °F (°C)	34.4 (1.3)	34.9 (1.6)	37.2 (2.9)	40.8 (4.9)	45.7 (7.6)	50.2 (10.1)	53.6 (12.0)	53.2 (11.8)	49.4 (9.7)	43.4 (6.3)	38.3 (3.5)	34.3 (1.3)	42.9 (6.1)
Mean minimum °F (°C)	23.0 (−5.0)	24.8 (−4.0)	28.5 (−1.9)	33.0 (0.6)	37.1 (2.8)	42.6 (5.9)	47.7 (8.7)	46.9 (8.3)	41.3 (5.2)	33.2 (0.7)	26.2 (−3.2)	21.9 (−5.6)	17.9 (−7.8)
Record low °F (°C)	2 (−17)	7 (−14)	18 (−8)	25 (−4)	31 (−1)	33 (1)	34 (1)	34 (1)	30 (−1)	23 (−5)	9 (−13)	−7 (−22)	−7 (−22)
Average precipitation inches (mm)	7.24 (184)	5.48 (139)	6.15 (156)	4.84 (123)	3.29 (84)	2.07 (53)	0.47 (12)	0.70 (18)	2.02 (51)	4.66 (118)	7.24 (184)	8.50 (216)	52.66 (1,338)
Average precipitation days (≥ 0.01 in)	20.3	16.9	18.5	17.9	13.4	9.6	3.4	3.9	7.5	13.8	19.2	20.9	165.3
Source: NOAA

== Demographics ==
Historical population
Census	Pop.	Note	%±
1880	226		—
1890	381		68.6%
1900	324		−15.0%
1910	703		117.0%
1920	649		−7.7%
1930	797		22.8%
1940	1,085		36.1%
1950	1,507		38.9%
1960	2,108		39.9%
1970	3,170		50.4%
1980	4,396		38.7%
1990	5,011		14.0%
2000	6,816		36.0%
2010	7,644		12.1%
2020	8,244		7.8%
U.S. Decennial Census

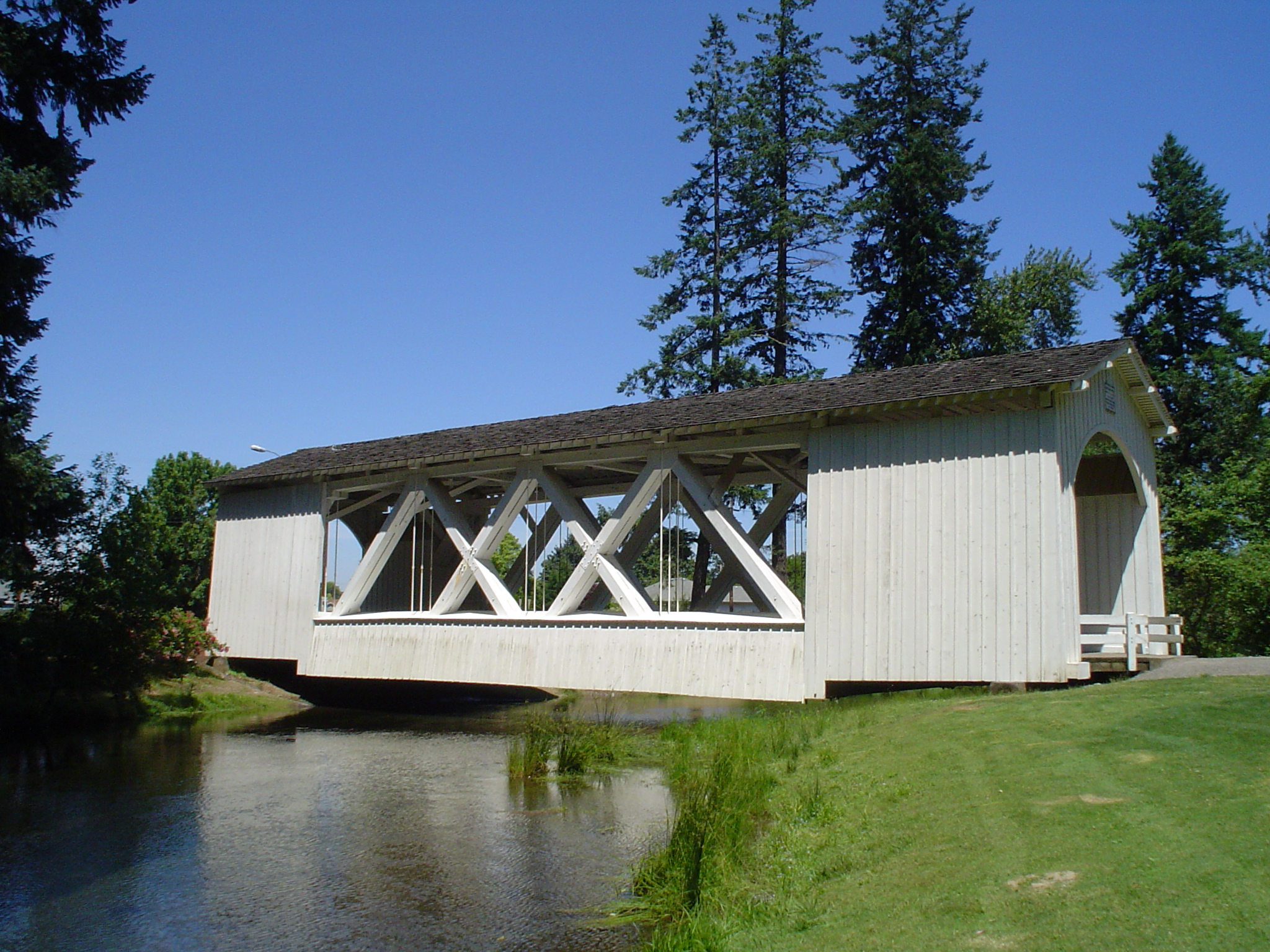
Stayton–Jordan bridge in Pioneer Park

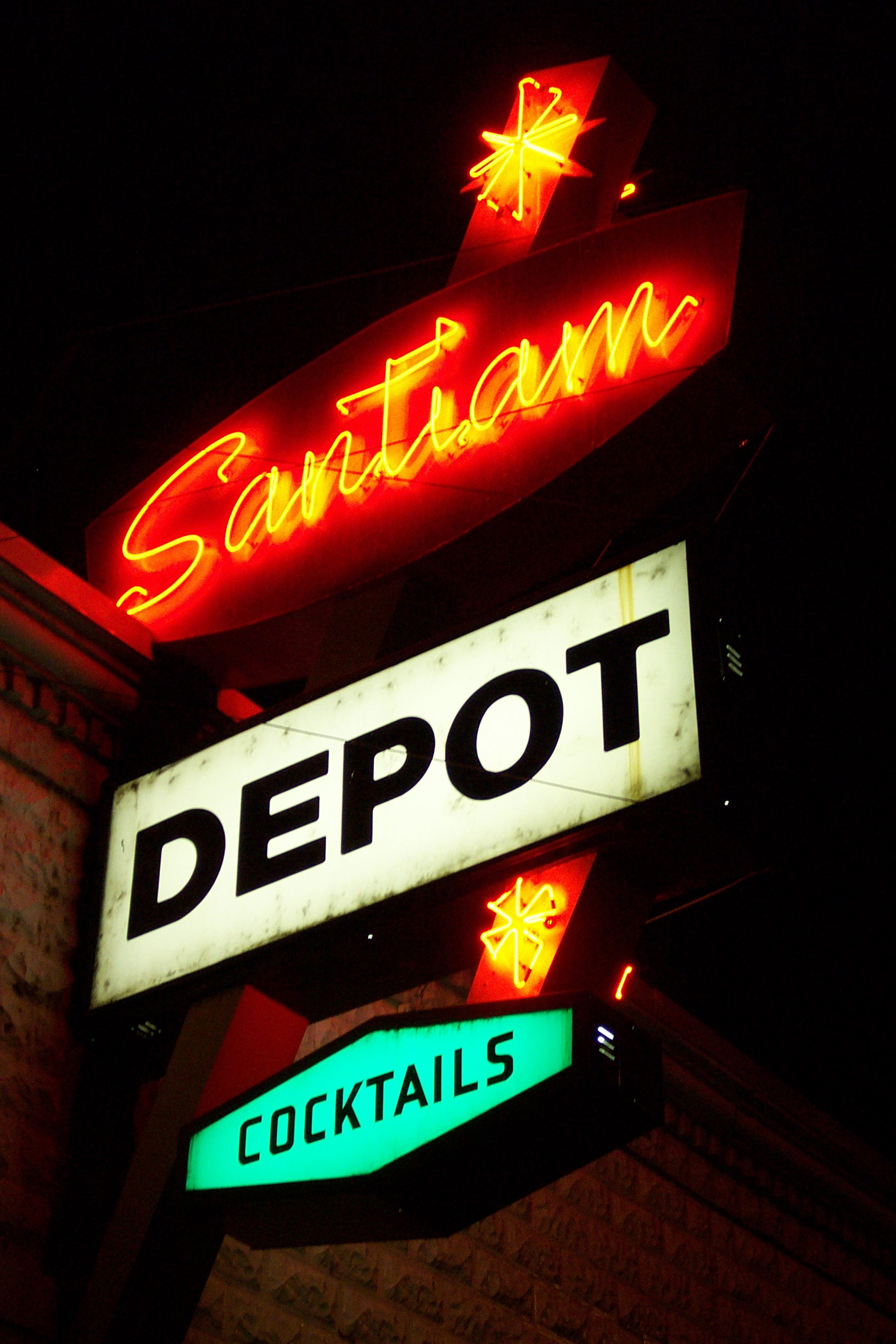
The Santiam Depot, a restaurant

=== 2020 census ===
As of the 2020 census, Stayton had a population of 8,244. The median age was 37.9 years, with 24.7% of residents under the age of 18 and 17.6% of residents 65 years of age or older. For every 100 females there were 93.9 males, and for every 100 females age 18 and over there were 91.7 males age 18 and over.

98.5% of residents lived in urban areas, while 1.5% lived in rural areas.

There were 3,105 households in Stayton, of which 35.9% had children under the age of 18 living in them. Of all households, 49.8% were married-couple households, 16.1% were households with a male householder and no spouse or partner present, and 26.5% were households with a female householder and no spouse or partner present. About 23.7% of all households were made up of individuals and 12.8% had someone living alone who was 65 years of age or older.

There were 3,233 housing units, of which 4.0% were vacant. Among occupied housing units, 60.6% were owner-occupied and 39.4% were renter-occupied. The homeowner vacancy rate was 0.9% and the rental vacancy rate was 4.7%.

Racial composition as of the 2020 census
Race	Number	Percent
White	6,386	77.5%
Black or African American	55	0.7%
American Indian and Alaska Native	130	1.6%
Asian	74	0.9%
Native Hawaiian and Other Pacific Islander	17	0.2%
Some other race	754	9.1%
Two or more races	828	10.0%
Hispanic or Latino (of any race)	1,441	17.5%

=== 2010 census ===
As of the census of 2010, there were 7,644 people, 2,882 households, and 2,031 families living in the city. The population density was 2,691.5 inhabitants per square mile (1,039.2/km^{2}). There were 3,049 housing units at an average density of 1,073.6 per square mile (414.5/km^{2}). The racial makeup of the city was 87.7% White, 14.3% Hispanic or Latino, 1.4% Native American, 0.7% Asian, 0.5% African American, 0.2% Pacific Islander, 5.9% from other races, and 3.6% from two or more races.

There were 2,882 households, of which 38.1% had children under the age of 18 living with them, 50.3% were married couples living together, 14.9% had a female householder with no husband present, 5.3% had a male householder with no wife present, and 29.5% were non-families. 24.6% of all households were made up of individuals, and 10.8% had someone living alone who was 65 years of age or older. The average household size was 2.65 and the average family size was 3.15.

The median age in the city was 35 years. 27.8% of residents were under the age of 18; 9% were between the ages of 18 and 24; 25.3% were from 25 to 44; 24.9% were from 45 to 64; and 12.9% were 65 years of age or older. The gender makeup of the city was 48.3% male and 51.7% female.

=== 2000 census ===
As of the census of 2000, there were 6,816 people, 2,519 households, and 1,851 families living in the city. The population density was 2,525.3 inhabitants per square mile (975.0/km^{2}). There were 2,654 housing units at an average density of 983.3 per square mile (379.7/km^{2}). The racial makeup of the city was 90.95% White, 9.18% Hispanic or Latino of any race, 1.50% Native American, 0.62% Asian, 0.13% African American, 0.07% Pacific Islander, 3.84% from other races, and 2.89% from two or more races.

There were 2,519 households, out of which 41.0% had children under the age of 18 living with them, 53.4% were married couples living together, 14.9% had a female householder with no husband present, and 26.5% were non-families. 21.7% of all households were made up of individuals, and 9.3% had someone living alone who was 65 years of age or older. The average household size was 2.70 and the average family size was 3.14.

In the city, the population was spread out, with 30.9% under the age of 18, 10.0% from 18 to 24, 27.7% from 25 to 44, 19.2% from 45 to 64, and 12.3% who were 65 years of age or older. The median age was 32 years. For every 100 females, there were 92.3 males. For every 100 females age 18 and over, there were 88.8 males.

The median income for a household in the city was $34,004, and the median income for a family was $41,389. Males had a median income of $32,437 versus $24,067 for females. The per capita income for the city was $15,740. About 11.5% of families and 14.2% of the population were below the poverty line, including 18.6% of those under age 18 and 5.6% of those age 65 or over.

== Education ==
Stayton is served by the North Santiam School District. Public schools in Stayton include Stayton High School, Stayton Middle/Intermediate School, and Stayton Elementary School. Private Catholic schools include Regis High School and St. Mary Elementary School.

== Infrastructure ==
Santiam Hospital is the lone hospital in the city. Stayton Public Library, one of 18 members of Chemeketa Cooperative Regional Library Service, is the sole library in the city. The only state highway is Route 22, which is located on the north side of Stayton, separating it from Sublimity.

== Points of interest ==
Local attractions include Pioneer Park with the Stayton–Jordan Bridge, a covered bridge. A copy of the Jordan Bridge that spanned Thomas Creek east of Scio, it was moved to the park in 1988. Destroyed by fire in 1994, it was rebuilt and painted white. It is used for social occasions such as weddings.

Kingston Prairie Preserve, 3 miles (5 km) southeast of Stayton, protects a remnant of the native prairie that was once common in the central Willamette Valley.

Silver Falls State Park is northeast of Stayton; it is the largest state park in Oregon and a major tourist destination in the region, popular for its camping, and for its waterfalls.

== Notable people ==
- Jay Baller, Major League Baseball pitcher
- Greg Brock, Major League Baseball first baseman
- Fred Girod, politician
- Albin W. Norblad, judge
- A. Walter Norblad, congressman
- Terry Schrunk, mayor of Portland
- Wanda Brown Shaw, educator
