= Stayton High School =

Stayton High School, Stayton Union High School
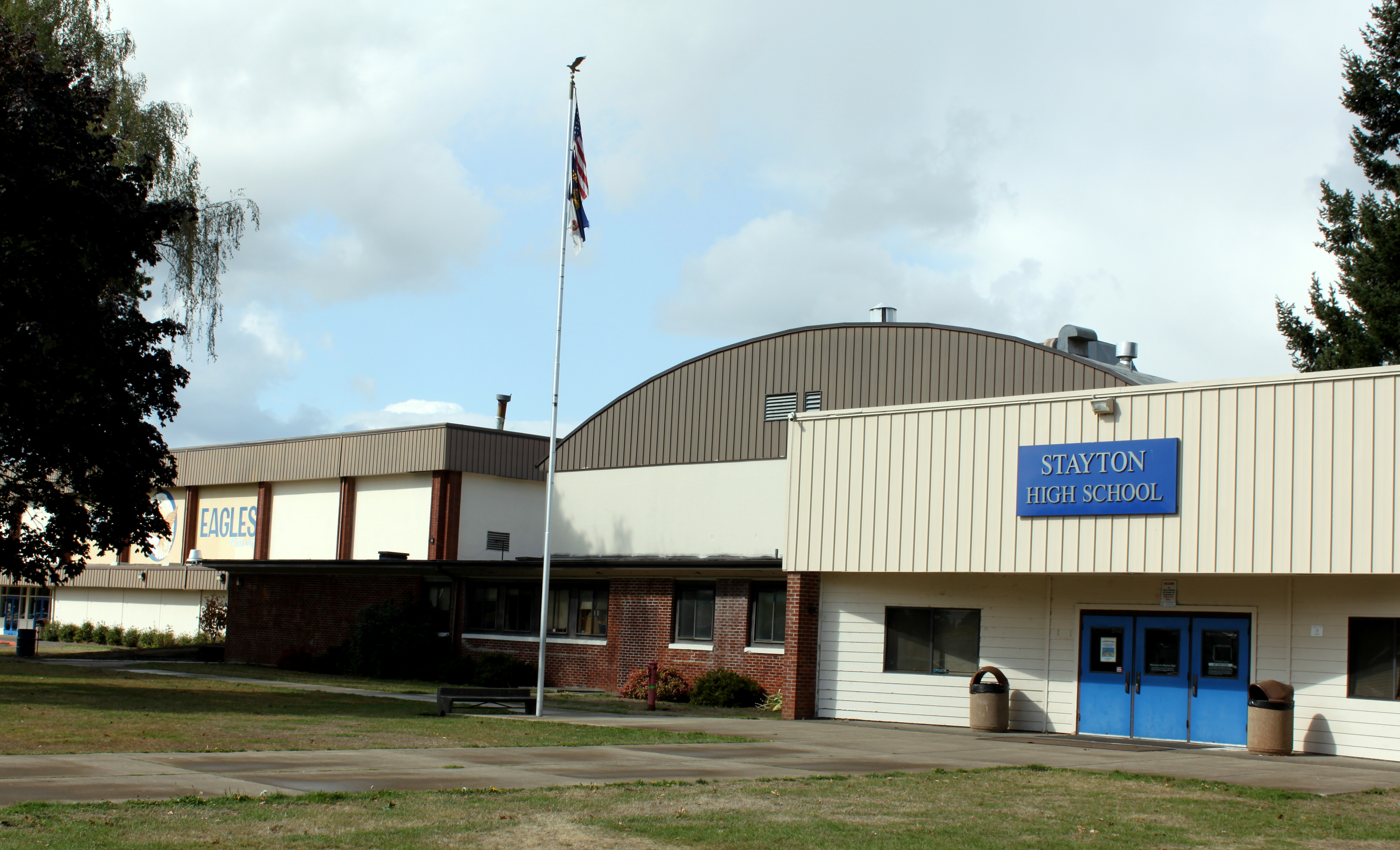

Location
- 757 W Locust Street; Stayton, (Marion County), Oregon 97383; United States; 44.802895°N 122.800924°W

Information
- Type: Public
- Opened: 1921
- School district: North Santiam School District
- Principal: Vicky Storey
- Grades: 9-12
- Enrollment: 753 (2019-20)
- Colors: Navy and gold
- Athletics conference: OSAA 4A-3 Oregon West Conference
- Mascot: Eagle
- Team name: The Eagles
- Rival: Cascade High School (Oregon)
- Newspaper: Aquila
- Website: shs.nssd29j.org

Stayton High School is a public high school in Stayton, Oregon, United States. Formerly known as Stayton Union High School, and established proper in 1921, Stayton High School became a unified school in 1949.

== Academics ==
As of 2018, according to Schooldigger.com, Stayton High ranked 106th out of 283 Oregon high schools, up from 174th in 2016.

=== Test scores ===
2012-2013 Stayton High School test scores:

- Math: 67.7% - State average: 68.8%
- Reading and Literature: 84.4% - State average: 84.5%
- Science: 68.1% - State average: 62.9%
- Writing: 54.3% - State average: 59.5%

=== Graduation ===
In the 2017–18 school year, 81% of students graduated on time, an increase of 8% from the previous year. By comparison, 70% received a regular high school diploma six years earlier in 2012.

== Athletics ==
=== Fall ===
- Cheerleading
- Cross country
- Football
- Soccer
- Volleyball

=== Winter ===
- Basketball
- Cheerleading
- Dance
- Swimming
- Wrestling

=== Spring ===
- Baseball
- Golf
- Softball
- Tennis
- Track

The school is known for their successful dance team, the Highlights. The team has won a total of 16 state championship titles, winning 12 of those consecutively from 2003–2014.

== Notable alumni ==
- Greg Brock, baseball player
- Fred Girod, dentist and member of the Oregon State Senate
