= Tyrell Williams =

American football player (born 1992)

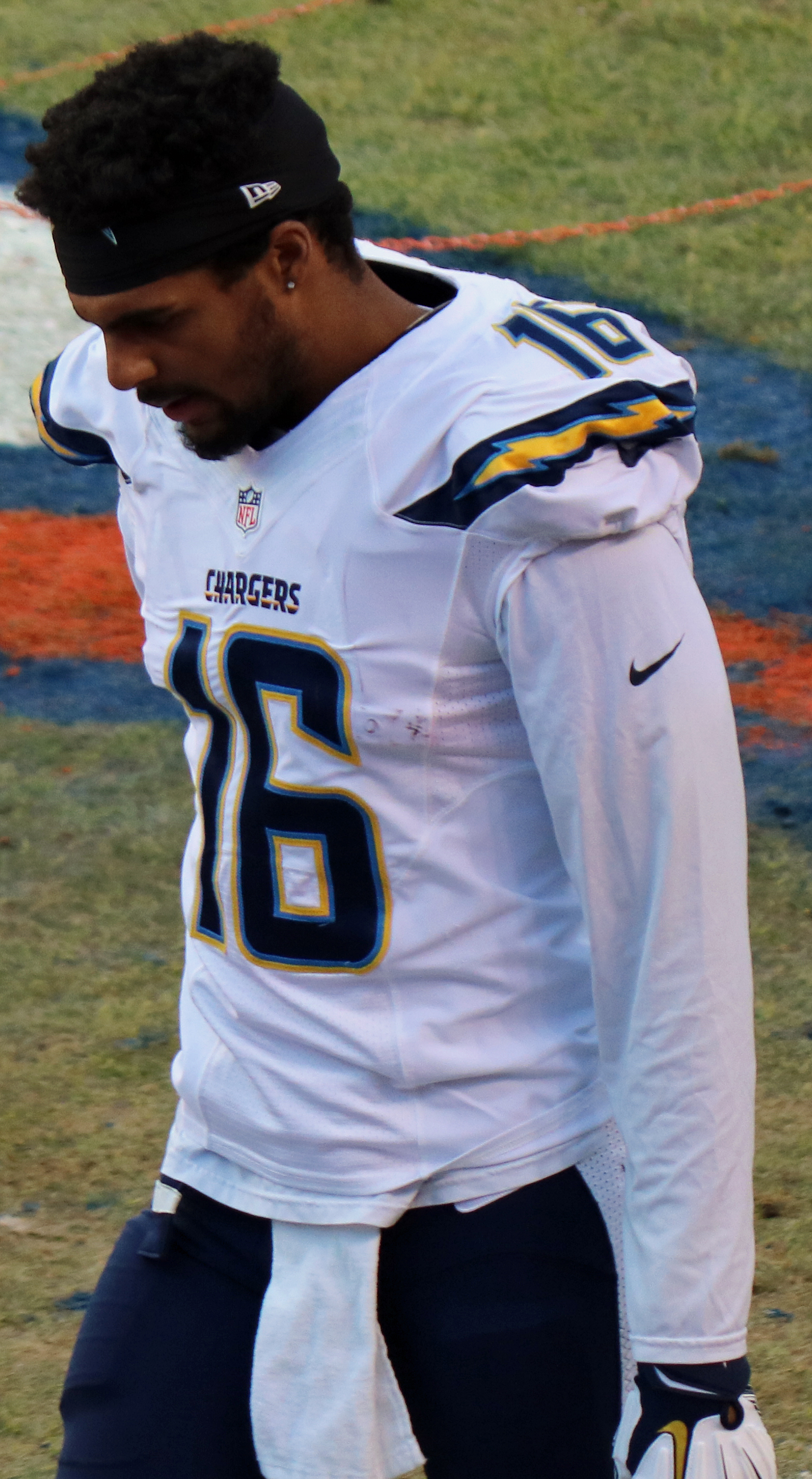
- Williams with the San Diego Chargers in 2015

No. 16, 6
- Position: Wide receiver

Personal information
- Born: February 12, 1992 (age 34); Salem, Oregon, U.S.
- Listed height: 6 ft 4 in (1.93 m)
- Listed weight: 210 lb (95 kg)

Career information
- High school: Cascade (Turner, Oregon)
- College: Western Oregon (2010–2014)
- NFL draft: 2015: undrafted

Career history
- San Diego / Los Angeles Chargers (2015–2018); Oakland / Las Vegas Raiders (2019–2020); Detroit Lions (2021)

Career NFL statistics
- Receptions: 199
- Receiving yards: 3,195
- Receiving touchdowns: 23
- Stats at Pro Football Reference

Tyrell Williams (born February 12, 1992) is an American former professional football player who was a wide receiver in the National Football League (NFL). He played college football for the Western Oregon Wolves and was signed by the San Diego Chargers as an undrafted free agent in 2015. He also played for the Oakland Raiders and Detroit Lions.

== Early life ==
Williams was born in Salem, Oregon. He attended and played high school football at Cascade High School in Turner, Oregon, a suburb of Salem. In addition, he played basketball and ran track. He earned all-state honors in the three sports during his senior season.

== College career ==
Williams attended and played college football at Western Oregon University. In his 5-year career at Western Oregon from 2010 to 2014, he recorded 184 receptions for 3,169 yards and 24 touchdowns. As a senior, he caught 56 passes for 950 yards and eight touchdowns.

== Professional career ==
Pre-draft measurables
Height	Weight	Arm length	Hand span	Wingspan	40-yard dash	10-yard split	20-yard split	20-yard shuttle	Three-cone drill	Vertical jump	Broad jump
6 ft 3 1/2 in (1.92 m)	204 lb (93 kg)	33 1/2 in (0.85 m)	9 7/8 in (0.25 m)	6 ft 6 3/8 in (1.99 m)	4.43 s	1.51 s	2.59 s	4.17 s	6.74 s	39.5 in (1.00 m)	10 ft 7 in (3.23 m)
All values from Pro Day

=== San Diego / Los Angeles Chargers ===
==== 2015 ====
On May 2, 2015, Williams was signed as an undrafted free agent by the San Diego Chargers following the 2015 NFL draft. On September 19, 2015, he was waived. On September 22, 2015, he was signed to the Chargers' practice squad. On November 21, 2015, he was promoted to the active roster.

On January 3, 2016, Williams made his first catch of the season and caught an 80-yard touchdown reception in the regular season finale. He finished the game with two catches for a total of 90 yards and one touchdown in a 20–27 loss to the Denver Broncos.

==== 2016 ====
In the 2016 season, Williams made two catches for 71 yards in the season opener against AFC West rival Kansas City Chiefs. He became the third wide receiver behind Dontrelle Inman and Travis Benjamin after starting wide receivers Keenan Allen and Stevie Johnson were placed on injured-reserve for the season. The following week, he caught his first touchdown of the season on a 44-yard reception against the Jacksonville Jaguars in Week 2. On October 9, 2016, he had his first career game with over 100 receiving yards against the Oakland Raiders. He finished the game with five receptions for 117 yards and a touchdown in the Chargers' 31–34 loss. In Week 7, against the Atlanta Falcons, he had seven receptions for 140 receiving yards in the 33–30 victory. In Week 10 against the Miami Dolphins, he had five receptions for 125 receiving yards and one receiving touchdown in the 31–24 loss. Williams finished his second season with 69 catches for 1,059 yards and seven touchdowns.

==== 2017 ====
In 2017, Williams played in all 16 games with 15 starts, recording 43 receptions for 728 yards and four touchdowns.

==== 2018 ====
On March 12, 2018, the Chargers placed a second-round restricted free agent tender on Williams. On April 23, 2018, he signed his tender. In Week 6, he recorded three receptions for 118 receiving yards and two receiving touchdowns in a victory over the Cleveland Browns. In the 2018 season, he finished with 41 receptions for 653 yards and five touchdowns. In the Wild Card Round victory over the Baltimore Ravens, he had two receptions for nine yards. In the Divisional Round loss to the New England Patriots, he had five receptions for 94 yards.

=== Oakland / Las Vegas Raiders ===
==== 2019 ====
On March 13, 2019, Williams signed a four-year, $44 million contract with the Raiders. Williams made his debut with the Raiders in Week 1 against the Broncos on Monday Night Football. In the game, Williams caught six passes for 105 yards and a touchdown in the 24–16 win. In Week 2 against the Chiefs, Williams caught five passes for 46 yards and one touchdown as the Raiders lost 28–10. In Week 3 against the Minnesota Vikings, Williams caught three passes for 29 yards and his third receiving touchdown of the season as the Raiders lost 34–14. In Week 4 against the Indianapolis Colts, Williams caught three passes for 36 yards and one touchdown in the 31–24 win. This was Williams' fourth consecutive game with a receiving touchdown. Williams was forced to miss the Raiders' next two games due to a foot injury. He made his return in Week 8 against the Houston Texans. In the game, Williams caught three passes for 91 yards and a touchdown in the 27–24 loss. Overall, Williams finished the 2019 season with 42 receptions for 651 receiving yards and six receiving touchdowns.

==== 2020 season ====
On September 1, 2020, Williams was placed on season-ending injured reserve after suffering a torn labrum in his shoulder.

On February 24, 2021, Williams was released by the Raiders.

=== Detroit Lions ===
==== 2021 ====
On March 9, 2021, Williams signed a one-year deal with the Detroit Lions. He was placed on injured reserve on September 23, 2021, after suffering a concussion in Week 1. He was released on November 5.

== NFL career statistics ==
Year	Team	Games		Receiving					Rushing					Fumbles	
Year	Team	GP	GS	Rec	Yds	Avg	Lng	TD	Att	Yds	Avg	Lng	TD	Fum	Lost
2015	SD	7	0	2	90	45.0	80T	1	—	—	—	—	—	0	0
2016	SD	16	12	69	1,059	15.3	51T	7	—	—	—	—	—	0	0
2017	LAC	16	15	43	728	16.9	75T	4	—	—	—	—	—	1	1
2018	LAC	16	10	41	653	15.9	75T	5	2	15	7.5	14	0	2	0
2019	OAK	14	12	42	651	15.5	46	6	—	—	—	—	—	0	0
2020	LV	0	0	Did not play due to injury											
2021	DET	1	1	2	14	7.0	7	0	—	—	—	—	—	0	0
Career		70	50	199	3,195	16.1	80	23	2	15	7.5	14	0	3	1
