= Cascade High School (Oregon) =

Public school in Oregon, United States

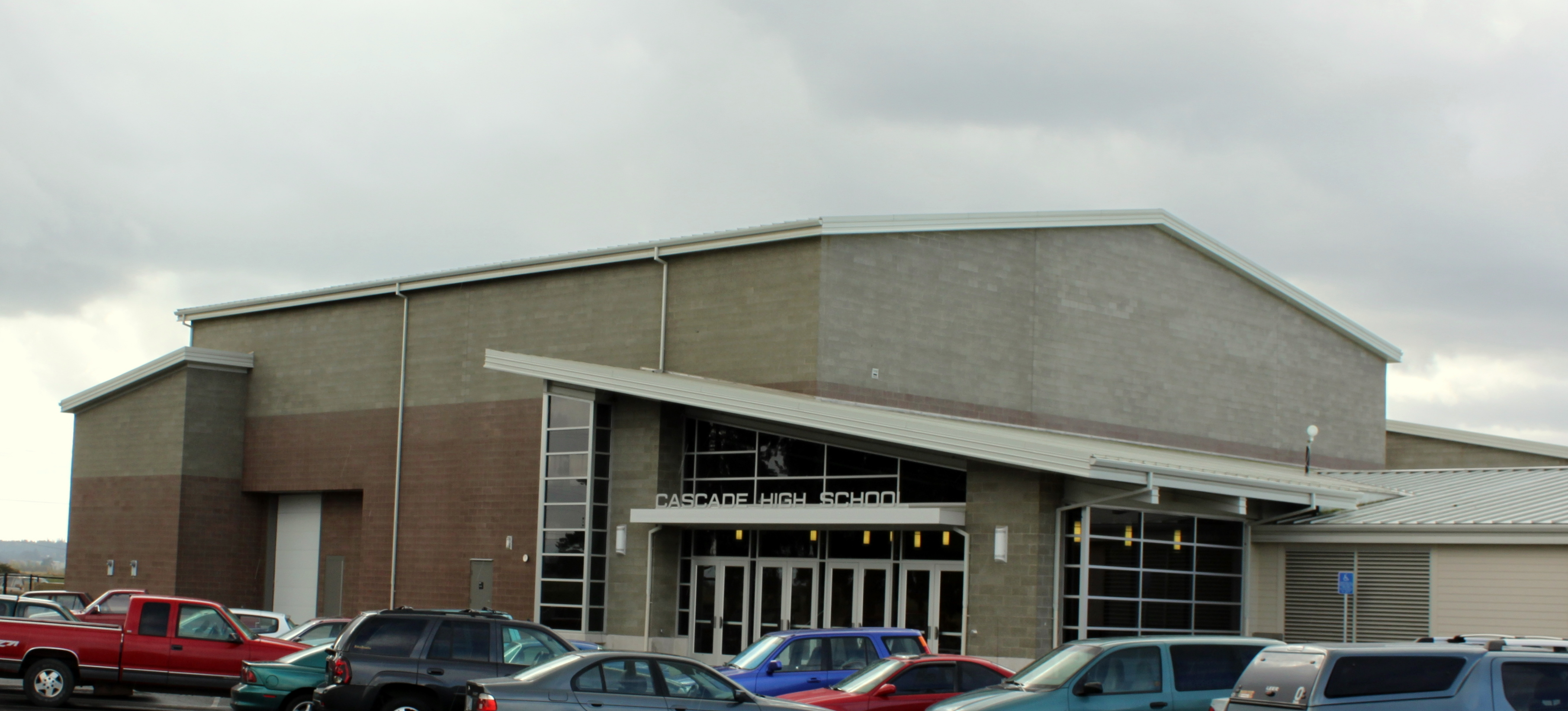

Location
- 10226 Marion Road SE; Turner postal address, (Marion County), Oregon 97392; United States; 44.807826°N 122.914175°W

Information
- Type: Public
- School district: Cascade School District
- Principal: Pete Rasmussen
- Staff: 43.70 (FTE)
- Grades: 9-12
- Enrollment: 814 (2023-2024)
- Student to teacher ratio: 18.63
- Colors: Black and pink
- Athletics conference: OSAA 4A-3 Oregon West Conference
- Mascot: Cougar
- Rival: Stayton High School
- Website: Cascade Senior High School

Cascade High School is a public high school in unincorporated Marion County, Oregon, United States, with a Turner postal address. The district administration facility is on the same property as the high school and the junior high school. It is a part of the Cascade School District.

Its school district includes Turner, Aumsville, Marion, and a small portion of Salem.

== Academics ==
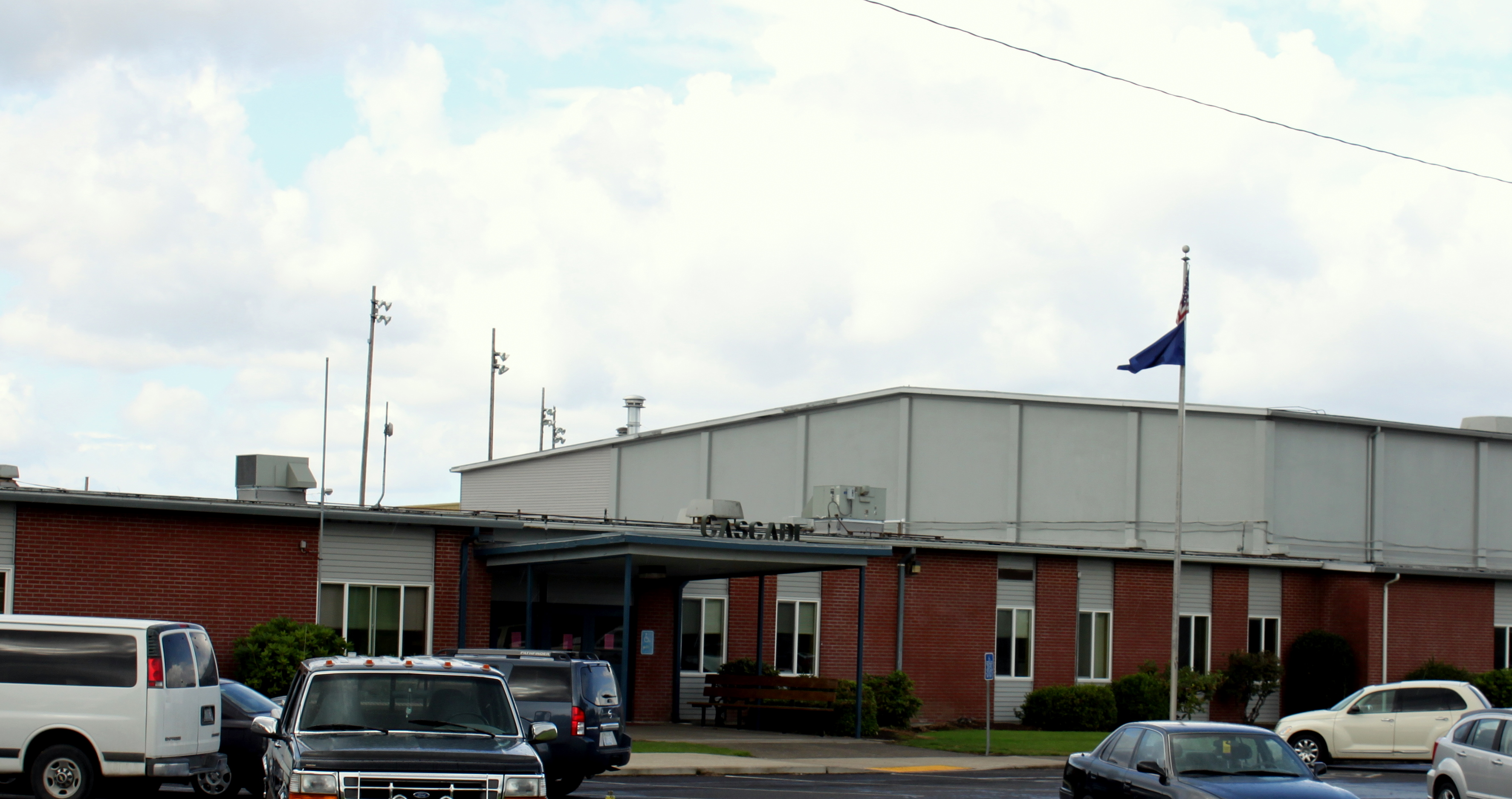
618 Original entrance

In 2008, 90% of the school's seniors received a high school diploma. Of 202 students, 181 graduated, one dropped out, six received a modified diploma, and 14 were still in high school in 2009.

== Notable alumni ==
- Jess Lewis - All-American linebacker at Oregon State University and the Houston Oilers
- Tyrell Williams - NFL Wide receiver for the Oakland Raiders
- Ryan Thompson - MLB pitcher for the Tampa Bay Rays
