= Santiam Hospital =

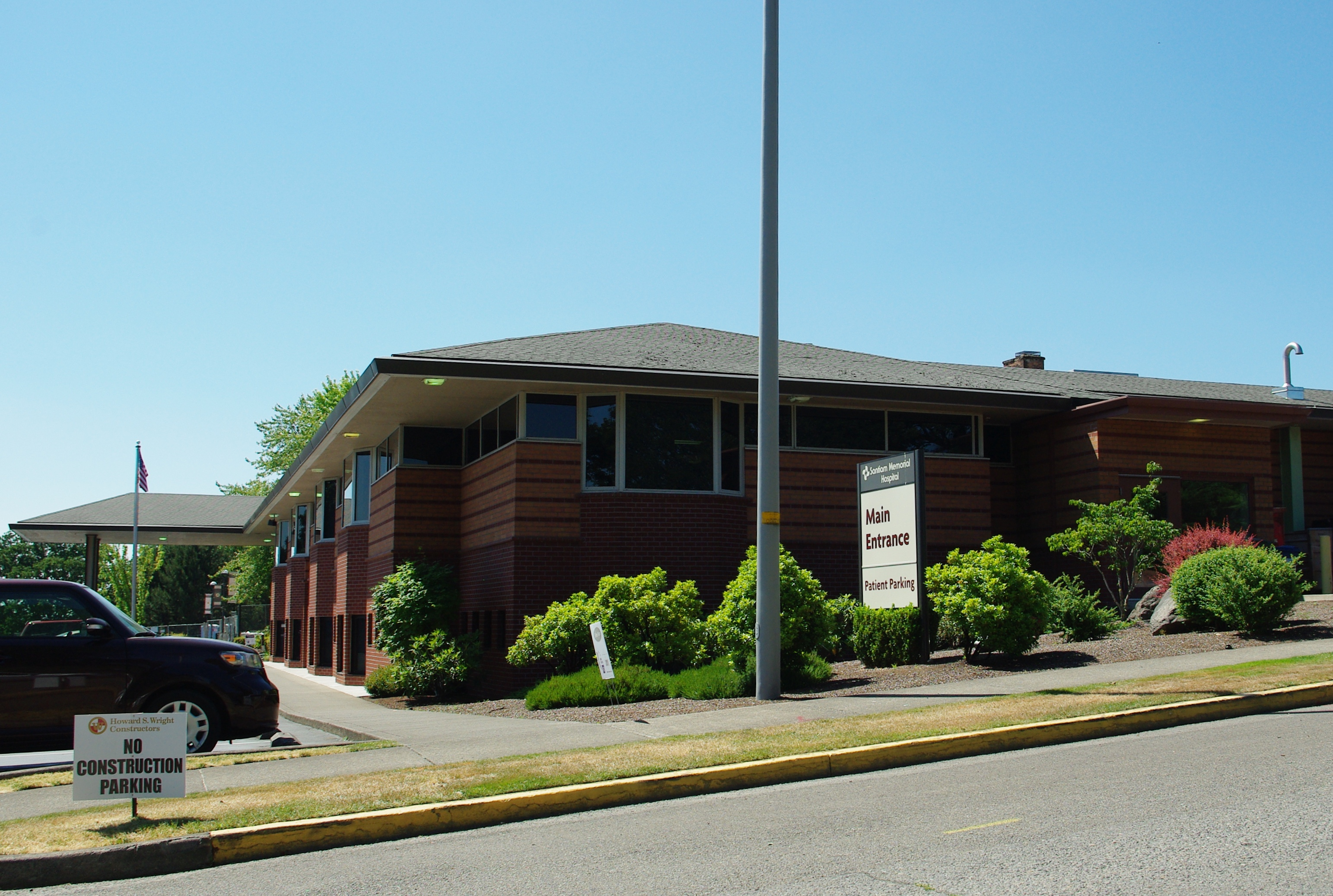
- Main entrance

Geography
- Location: 1401 N 10th Avenue, Stayton, Oregon, United States
- Coordinates: 44.80522°N 122.7849°W

Organization
- Care system: non-profit
- Type: General, acute care

Services
- Beds: 40

History
- Opened: 1953

Links
- Website: santiamhospital.org
- Lists: Hospitals in Oregon

Santiam Hospital is a hospital in Stayton in the U.S. state of Oregon. Established in 1953, the 40-bed facility serves eastern Marion County and the suburbs of Salem.

== History ==
A non-profit group was created in 1950 by civic leaders in the Stayton area with the goal of creating a hospital to serve the community. Funds to build the hospital were raised by subscription. In March 1953, Santiam Memorial Hospital opened. The hospital looked to expand by adding six beds in 1961 at a cost of about $90,000, but the lack of a sewer system in the city hampered the project. In 1968, the facility began working to build a helipad. On March 11, 1983, a nursing station at the hospital was robbed at gunpoint by a man seeking drugs. It was one of five hospitals in Oregon as of 2007 that did not participate in reporting errors to the Oregon Patient Safety Commission, however they are a current participant. An expansion that doubled the size of the facility ended in 2012, and the next year the name was shortened to Santiam Hospital.

== Operations ==
Santiam has 40 licensed beds, and staffs all 40 of the beds. The hospital serves the eastern portions of Marion County in the Salem area. The state of Oregon classifies the hospital as a type B rural hospital. Services at the facility include emergency services, eye health, cardiology, maternity, surgery, pharmacy, radiology, breast health, cardiac rehabilitation, and orthopedic services, among others. For 2013, the hospital had a total of 1,017 discharges, with 3,643 patient days, and 10,507 emergency room visits, plus 36,559 outpatient visits. Also that year were 114 births and 403 inpatient surgeries. In 2013 Santiam Hospital had $69,539,308 in gross patient revenues, provided $1,453,998 in charity care, had $38,818,184 total in operating expenses, and an income of $79,194.

The hospital has a heliport with FAA LID: 5OR7.
