= Greg Brock (baseball) =

American baseball player (born 1957)

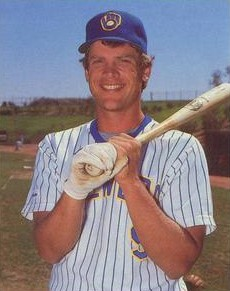
- First baseman
- Born: June 14, 1957 (age 69); McMinnville, Oregon, U.S.
- Batted: Left Threw: Right

MLB debut
- September 1, 1982, for the Los Angeles Dodgers

Last MLB appearance
- June 28, 1991, for the Milwaukee Brewers

MLB statistics
- Batting average: .248
- Home runs: 110
- Runs batted in: 462
- Stats at Baseball Reference

Teams
- Los Angeles Dodgers (1982–1986); Milwaukee Brewers (1987–1991)

Gregory Allen Brock (born June 14, 1957) is an American former professional baseball first baseman. He played for 10 seasons in Major League Baseball (MLB), splitting his time evenly between the Los Angeles Dodgers and Milwaukee Brewers.

== Early life ==
Brock was born in McMinnville, Oregon, the son of Marilyn and Joe Brock, who coached baseball at Stayton High School. Greg played for his father at the school, and in 1995 had his jersey retired. Brock attended the University of Wyoming.

== Career statistics ==
In 1013 games over 10 major league seasons, Brock posted a .248 batting average (794-for-3202) with 420 runs, 141 doubles, 6 triples, 110 home runs, 462 RBI, 41 stolen bases, 434 bases on balls, .338 on-base percentage and .399 slugging percentage. Defensively, he recorded a .994 fielding percentage as a first baseman. In the 1983 and 1985 National League Championship Series, he hit only .048 (1-for-21) with 3 runs, 1 home run, 2 RBI and 2 walks in 8 games.
