= Turner, Oregon =

- City
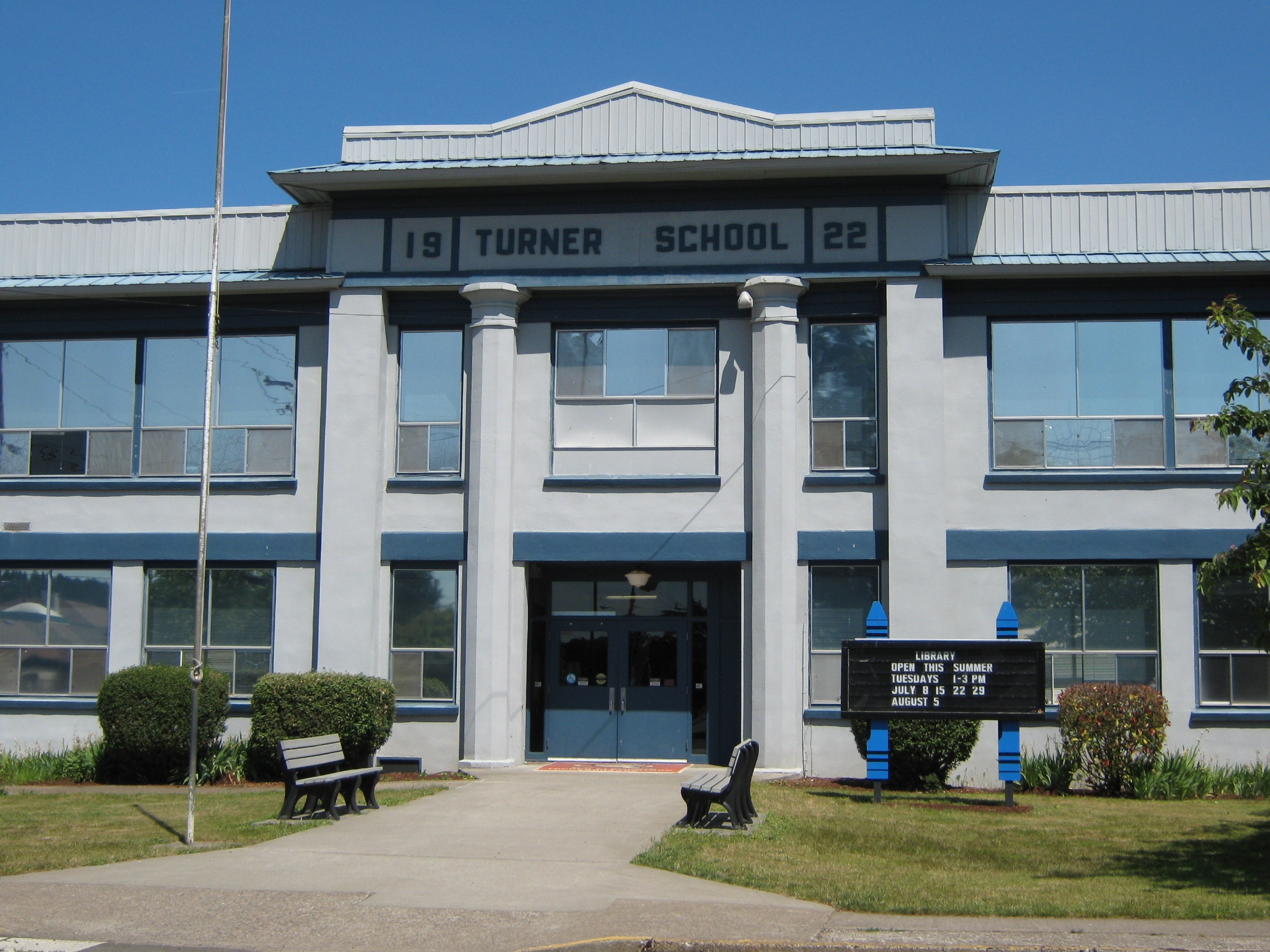
- Turner Elementary School (built as the K-12 Turner School)
- Motto: The Good Neighbor Town
- Location in Oregon
- Coordinates: 44°50′56″N 122°57′07″W
- Country: United States
- State: Oregon
- County: Marion
- Incorporated: 1905

Government
  - Mayor: Mike Schaufler

Area
  - Total: 1.45 sq mi (3.76 km^{2})
  - Land: 1.43 sq mi (3.71 km^{2})
  - Water: 0.019 sq mi (0.05 km^{2})
- Elevation: 407 ft (124 m)

Population (2020)
  - Total: 2,454
  - Density: 1,712.7/sq mi (661.26/km^{2})
- Time zone: UTC-8 (Pacific)
  - Summer (DST): UTC-7 (Pacific)
- ZIP Code: 97392
- Area code: 503
- FIPS code: 41-75150
- GNIS feature ID: 2412115
- Website: turneroregon.gov

Turner is a city in Marion County, Oregon, United States. The population was 2,454 at the 2020 census, up from 1,854 in 2010. It is part of the Salem Metropolitan Statistical Area. The community was incorporated by the Oregon Legislative Assembly on February 10, 1905.

Since 1971, it has been the location of the Enchanted Forest amusement park.

== Geography ==
Turner is in western Marion County, 10 miles (16 km) southeast of downtown Salem, the state capital and Marion county seat, but less than 1 mile (1.6 km) southeast of the Salem city limits. It is 4 miles (6 km) west of Aumsville.

According to the U.S. Census Bureau, Turner has a total area of 1.45 square miles (3.76 km^{2}), of which 1.43 square miles (3.70 km^{2}) are land and 0.02 square miles (0.05 km^{2}), or 1.24%, are water. Mill Creek, which runs through the center of town, is a northwest-flowing tributary of the Willamette River, joining it in the center of Salem.

== Demographics ==
Historical population
Census	Pop.	Note	%±
1880	85		—
1910	191		—
1920	289		51.3%
1930	283		−2.1%
1940	414		46.3%
1950	610		47.3%
1960	770		26.2%
1970	846		9.9%
1980	1,116		31.9%
1990	1,281		14.8%
2000	1,199		−6.4%
2010	1,854		54.6%
2020	2,454		32.4%
U.S. Decennial Census

=== 2020 census ===
As of the 2020 census, Turner had a population of 2,454. The median age was 39.4 years. 22.7% of residents were under the age of 18 and 19.4% of residents were 65 years of age or older. For every 100 females there were 93.1 males, and for every 100 females age 18 and over there were 90.2 males age 18 and over.

99.7% of residents lived in urban areas, while 0.3% lived in rural areas.

There were 912 households in Turner, of which 33.9% had children under the age of 18 living in them. Of all households, 58.2% were married-couple households, 12.3% were households with a male householder and no spouse or partner present, and 22.7% were households with a female householder and no spouse or partner present. About 21.3% of all households were made up of individuals and 13.0% had someone living alone who was 65 years of age or older.

There were 978 housing units, of which 6.7% were vacant. Among occupied housing units, 76.0% were owner-occupied and 24.0% were renter-occupied. The homeowner vacancy rate was <0.1% and the rental vacancy rate was 2.2%.

Racial composition as of the 2020 census
Race	Number	Percentage
White	2,067	84.2%
Black or African American	7	0.3%
American Indian and Alaska Native	39	1.6%
Asian	38	1.5%
Native Hawaiian and Other Pacific Islander	3	0.1%
Some other race	73	3.0%
Two or more races	227	9.3%
Hispanic or Latino (of any race)	190	7.7%

=== 2010 census ===
As of the census of 2010, there were 1,854 people, 710 households, and 513 families living in the city. The population density was 1,296.5 inhabitants per square mile (500.6/km^{2}). There were 768 housing units at an average density of 537.1 per square mile (207.4/km^{2}). The racial makeup of the city was 93.2% White, 0.6% African American, 1.7% Native American, 0.5% Asian, 2.0% from other races, and 2.0% from two or more races. Hispanic or Latino of any race were 7.3% of the population.

There were 710 households, of which 33.1% had children under the age of 18 living with them, 57.6% were married couples living together, 8.9% had a female householder with no husband present, 5.8% had a male householder with no wife present, and 27.7% were non-families. 23.5% of all households were made up of individuals, and 15.3% had someone living alone who was 65 years of age or older. The average household size was 2.61 and the average family size was 3.07.

The median age in the city was 39 years. 25.5% of residents were under the age of 18; 7.1% were between the ages of 18 and 24; 24.8% were from 25 to 44; 24.4% were from 45 to 64; and 18.3% were 65 years of age or older. The gender makeup of the city was 48.1% male and 51.9% female.

=== 2000 census ===
As of the census of 2000, there were 1,199 people, 491 households, and 330 families living in the city. The population density was 778.0 inhabitants per square mile (300.4/km^{2}). There were 522 housing units at an average density of 338.7 per square mile (130.8/km^{2}). The racial makeup of the city was 93.83% White, 0.08% African American, 1.67% Native American, 0.25% Asian, 2.00% from other races, and 2.17% from two or more races. Hispanic or Latino of any race were 4.34% of the population.

There were 491 households, out of which 27.1% had children under the age of 18 living with them, 56.8% were married couples living together, 7.1% had a female householder with no husband present, and 32.6% were non-families. 27.5% of all households were made up of individuals, and 20.0% had someone living alone who was 65 years of age or older. The average household size was 2.44 and the average family size was 2.99.

In the city, the population was spread out, with 23.8% under the age of 18, 7.4% from 18 to 24, 24.3% from 25 to 44, 22.4% from 45 to 64, and 22.1% who were 65 years of age or older. The median age was 41 years. For every 100 females, there were 92.8 males. For every 100 females age 18 and over, there were 88.5 males.

The median income for a household in the city was $36,250, and the median income for a family was $43,906. Males had a median income of $38,125 versus $23,636 for females. The per capita income for the city was $26,234. About 4.8% of families and 9.2% of the population were below the poverty line, including 9.8% of those under age 18 and 7.3% of those age 65 or over.

== Education ==
Turner is served by the Cascade School District, which operates Cascade High School, Cascade Junior High, and three elementary schools.

== Notable people ==
- Dean Cromwell (1879–1962), U.S. Olympic track and field coach, USC track and football coach
- Ryan Thompson (born 1992), Major League Baseball pitcher, Arizona Diamondbacks
- Tyrell Williams (born 1992), NFL wide receiver, Las Vegas Raiders

== See also ==
- Enchanted Forest
