= Marion, Oregon =

Unincorporated community in the state of Oregon, United States

- Census-designated place
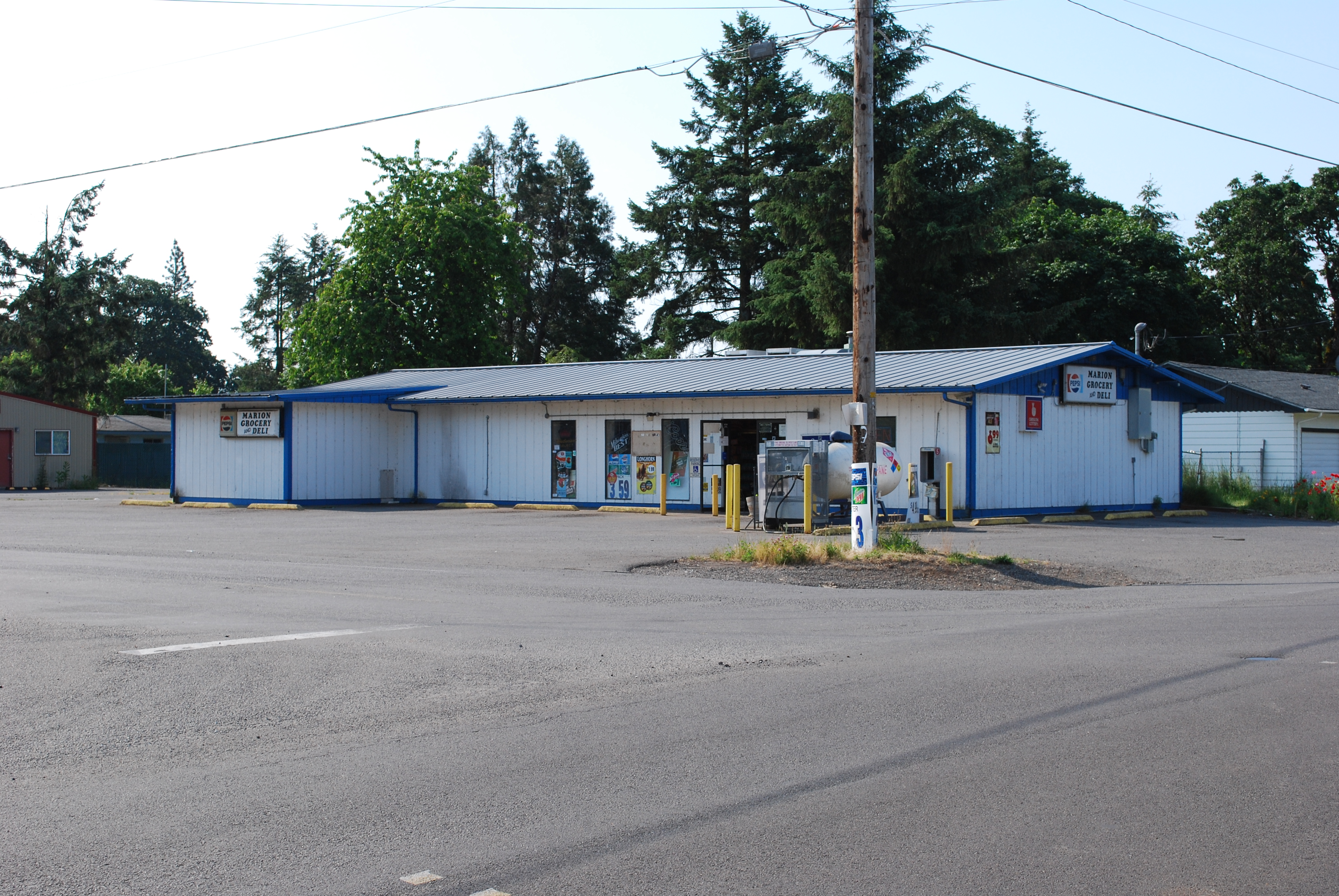
- Marion Grocery and Deli

- Location in Marion County and the state of Oregon
- Coordinates: 44°44′56″N 122°56′25″W
- Country: United States
- State: Oregon
- County: Marion

Area
  - Total: 1.15 sq mi (2.97 km^{2})
  - Land: 1.15 sq mi (2.97 km^{2})
  - Water: 0 sq mi (0.00 km^{2})
- Elevation: 315 ft (96 m)

Population (2020)
  - Total: 307
  - Density: 267.4/sq mi (103.25/km^{2})
- Time zone: UTC-8 (Pacific (PST))
  - Summer (DST): UTC-7 (PDT)
- ZIP Code: 97392 (Turner)
- Area code: 503
- FIPS code: 41-45900
- GNIS feature ID: 2408180

Marion is an unincorporated community and census-designated place (CDP) in Marion County, Oregon, United States. The population was 307 at the 2020 census. Marion is part of the Salem Metropolitan Statistical Area.

== Geography ==
Marion is in southwestern Marion County, 1 mile (1.6 km) north of the North Santiam River and the Linn County line. Marion is 5 miles (8 km) northeast of Jefferson, 8 miles (13 km) southwest of Stayton, and 17 miles (27 km) south-southeast of Salem, the state capital and Marion county seat.

According to the U.S. Census Bureau, the Marion CDP has a total area of 1.15 square miles (2.98 km^{2}), all land.

== Demographics ==
Historical population
Census	Pop.	Note	%±
2000	274		—
2010	313		14.2%
2020	307		−1.9%
U.S. Decennial Census

=== 2000 census ===
As of the census of 2000, there were 274 people, 92 households, and 69 families residing in the CDP. The population density was 236.5 inhabitants per square mile (91.3/km^{2}). There were 99 housing units at an average density of 85.4 per square mile (33.0/km^{2}). The racial makeup of the CDP was 89.42% White, 4.38% Native American, 3.28% from other races, and 2.92% from two or more races. Hispanic or Latino of any race were 5.47% of the population.

There were 92 households, out of which 33.7% had children under the age of 18 living with them, 64.1% were married couples living together, 6.5% had a female householder with no husband present, and 25.0% were non-families. 19.6% of all households were made up of individuals, and 13.0% had someone living alone who was 65 years of age or older. The average household size was 2.98 and the average family size was 3.38.

In the CDP, the population was spread out, with 31.4% under the age of 18, 5.1% from 18 to 24, 27.4% from 25 to 44, 20.1% from 45 to 64, and 16.1% who were 65 years of age or older. The median age was 37 years. For every 100 females, there were 87.7 males. For every 100 females age 18 and over, there were 89.9 males.

The median income for a household in the CDP was $21,389, and the median income for a family was $20,625. Males had a median income of $34,250 versus $23,750 for females. The per capita income for the CDP was $9,916. About 38.3% of families and 40.9% of the population were below the poverty line, including 68.5% of those under the age of eighteen and 30.8% of those 65 or over.
