= Portland Interscholastic League =

High school athletic conference in Portland, Oregon

The Portland Interscholastic League (PIL) is a high school athletic conference in Portland, Oregon, that is a member of the Oregon School Activities Association (OSAA). It consists of high schools in the Portland Public Schools district. Competition among member schools dates back to at least 1900.

== Member schools ==
The conference has nine schools in the OSAA 6A classification. The teams in the conference had competed in as many as three classifications since 2006, but were unified in the 6A classification for the 2014–2015 season.

School	Enrollment (2017)	Mascot	Established
Benson Polytechnic High School	1,026	Astros	1919
Cleveland High School	1,586	Warriors	1916
Franklin High School	1,745	Lightning	1914
Grant High School	1,512	Generals	1924
Jefferson High School	677	Democrats	1908
Lincoln High School	1,705	Cardinals	1869
McDaniel High School	1,146	Mountain Lions	1957
Roosevelt High School	859	Roughriders	1922
Wells-Barnett High School	1,512	Guardians	1956

=== Defunct schools ===
- Adams High School (closed 1981)
- Jackson High School (closed 1981)
- James John High School (closed 1921)
- Marshall High School (closed 2011)
- Washington-Monroe High School (closed 1981)

== Hall of Fame ==
The PIL Hall of Fame Association was established in 1981 to honor athletes, coaches, and administrators who have been a part of the PIL.

== PIL Boys Basketball State Champions ==
PIL Teams have competed in the OSAA State Basketball Championship since it was first held in 1919.

Year	Class	School (W-L)	Coach
1919	---	Lincoln (14-0)	George Dewey
1921	---	Franklin (17-1)	Colton Meek
1928	---	Washington (23-3)	Eldon Jenne
1945	A	Washington (26-2)	Ted Schopf
1949	A	Roosevelt (24-6)	Rollie Rourke
1952	A	Lincoln (24-3)	Jim Partlow
1956	A-1	Franklin (22-4)	Mel Krause
1957	A-1	Lincoln (22-4)	Wayne Sturdivant
1959	A-1	Franklin (22-5)	Don Peterson
1969	A-1	Grant (26-1)	Ed Rooney
1971	AAA	Benson (26-2)	Dick Gray
1973	AAA	Benson (26-1)	Dick Gray
1974	AAA	Benson (25-2)	Dick Gray
1981	AAA	Benson (25-1)	Dick Gray
1985	AAA	Wilson (22-2)	Dick Beachell
1986	AAA	Grant (24-1)	John Stilwell
1989	AAA	Wilson (25-1)	Dick Beachell
1990	AAA	Benson (23-4)	Dick Gray
1991	4A	Wilson (26-0)	Dick Beachell
2000	4A	Jefferson (28-0)	Marshall Haskins
2008	6A	Grant (22-6)	Tony Broadous
2008	5A	Jefferson (25-1)	Marshall Haskins
2009	5A	Jefferson (20-6)	Pat Strickland
2010	5A	Jefferson (20-6)	Pat Strickland
2013	5A	Jefferson (24-4)	Pat Strickland
2014	5A	Jefferson (26-1)	Pat Strickland
2017	6A	Jefferson (27-1)	Pat Strickland
2018	6A	Grant (25-4)	Robert Key
