= James John Elementary School =

James John Elementary
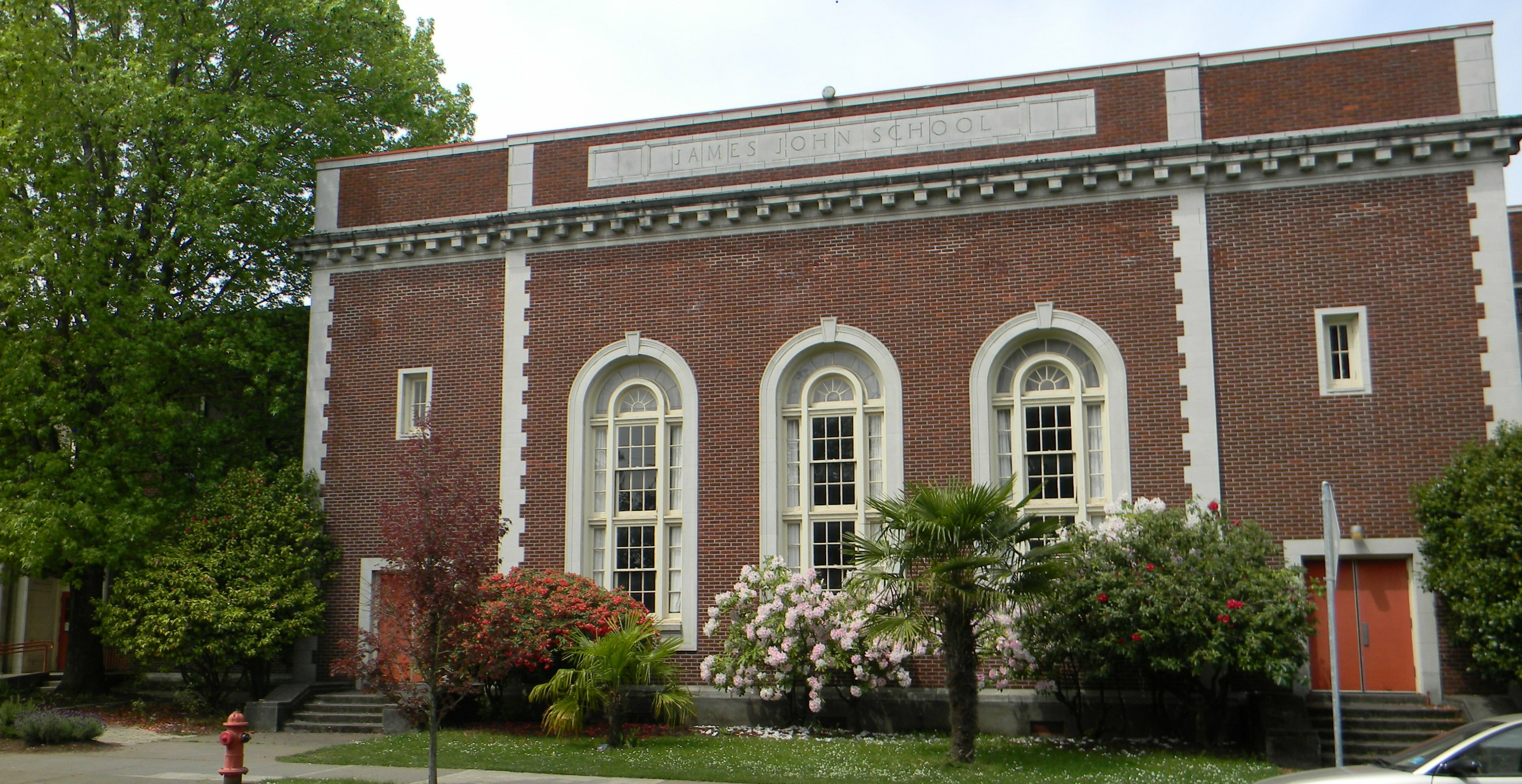

Location
- 7439 N Charleston Ave. Portland, Oregon 97203; United States; 45.5903°N 122.7519°W

Information
- Established: 1929
- School district: Portland Public Schools
- Principal: John Melvin
- Grades: K–5
- Enrollment: 368 (2017)
- Average class size: 22.4
- Feeder to: George Middle School; Roosevelt High School
- Website: jamesjohn.pps.net

James John Elementary is a K–5 school within the Portland Public Schools district located in the St. Johns neighborhood of north Portland, Oregon, United States. Built in 1929, it feeds graduates to George Middle School which then feeds Roosevelt High School.

== History ==
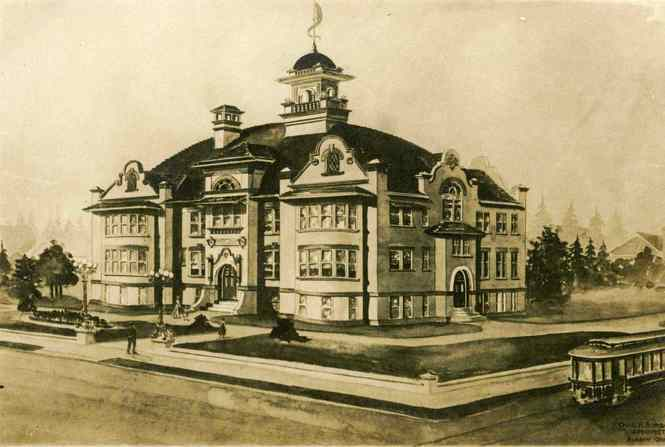
James John High School, predecessor to James John Elementary

James John Elementary is named after the pioneer of St. Johns who bequeathed land and money for the establishment of a school. In 1911, James John High School was built on what is now the playground for the current school.

The current building was designed by the prolific architect George Howell Jones in a two-story Classical Revival style and influenced by John Dewey’s Progressive Education Movement. It is similar to numerous other "fireproof" Portland schools of the era that were built in response to some highly publicized school fires elsewhere in the U.S.

The school became a K–8 when Roosevelt High School was founded in 1921 and became a K–5 school when George Middle School was founded in 1951. At some point later it again became a K–8 school, and in the fall of 1985, when the new George Middle School was completed James John was again switched to a K–5 elementary school.

== Profile ==
Ethnic/Racial Profile (2017)

African American	Asian	Hispanic	Native American	Pacific Islander	White	Multiple Races
9.0%	3.8%	39.4%	1.1%	1.4%	37.2%	8.2%

Percent Meeting or Exceeding Achievement Benchmarks

Year	3rd Grade Reading	3rd Grade Math	5th Grade Reading	5th Grade Math
2010-2011	87.5%	56.3%	60.4%	52.8%
2011-2012	61.4%	52.9%	48.4%	39.1%
2012-2013	40%	33.3%	56.3%	39.6%

Five-year Student Body Growth

Year	K	1	2	3	4	5	Total
2009	70	73	48	64	61	68	384
2013	85	99	80	68	59	70	461

Select Demographics 2012-2013

English Learners	31%
Economically disadvantaged	84%
Students with disabilities	19%
Different languages spoken	14
