= 2023 Portland Association of Teachers strike =

Labor strike in the U.S. state of Oregon

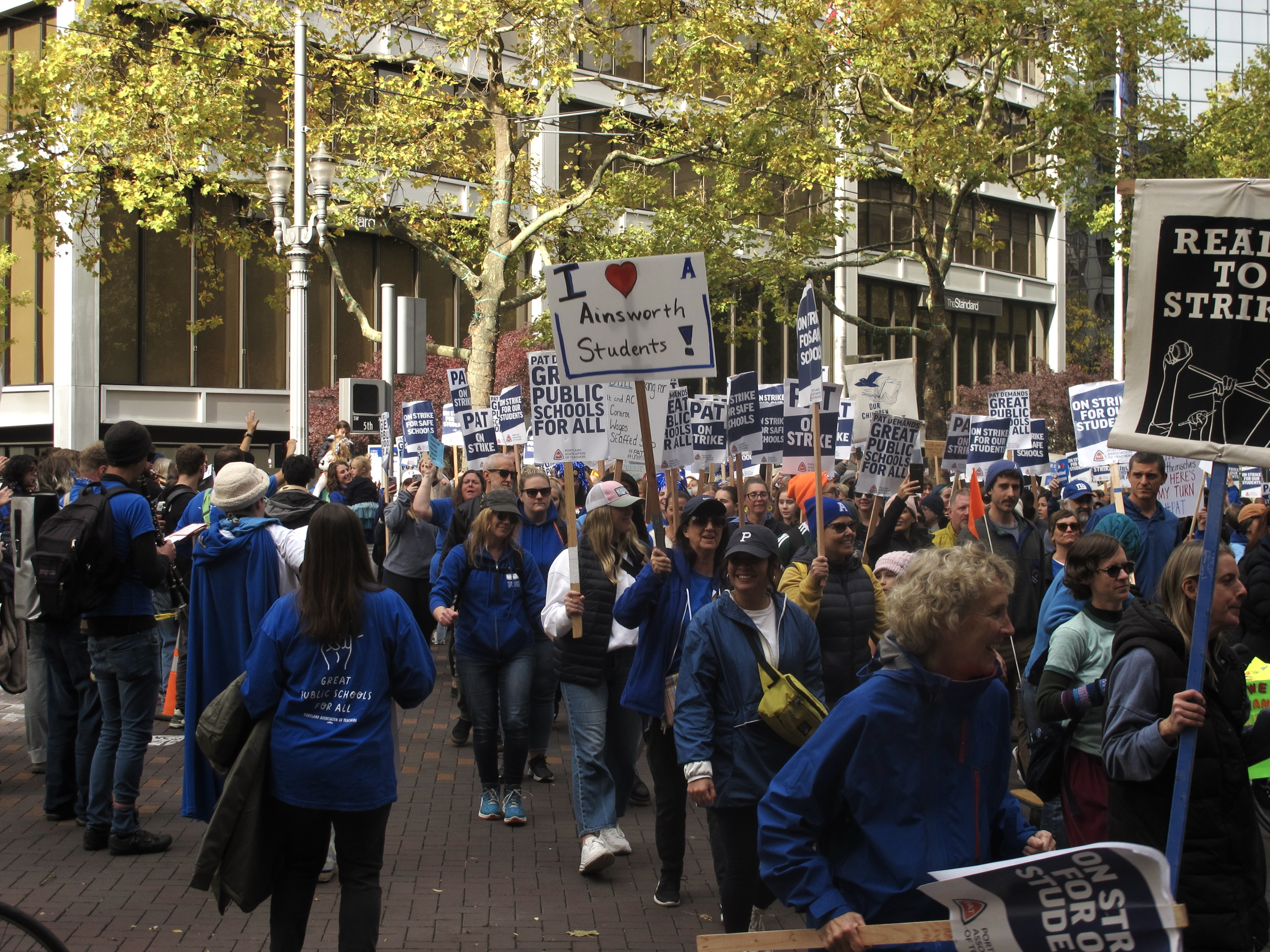
- Teachers marching in downtown Portland on the second day of the strike.
- Date: November 1, 2023 – November 26, 2023
- Location: Portland, Oregon
- Goals: Raises to match inflation, lower class sizes, and increased planning time
- Methods: Strike action
- Result: 13.8 percent cost-of-living adjustment across 3 years, address class size

Parties
Portland Association of Teachers (PAT)	Portland Public Schools (PPS)

Number
3,700 teachers and other employees	

The 2023 Portland Association of Teachers strike was a labor strike involving teachers at Portland Public Schools (PPS), the largest school district in the U.S. state of Oregon. The strike began on 1 November 2023, and ended on 26 November 2023. Spanning 11 instructional days, this strike was one of the longest teachers' strikes in recent years. The strike was organized by the Portland Association of Teachers (PAT), representing roughly 3,700 teachers and other employees. The issues driving the strike included raises to match inflation, lower class sizes, and increased planning time.

== Background ==
This was the first teacher strike in district history, although PAT teachers had voted to strike in the past. In 2003, PAT teachers voted to strike, but then changed course, accepting a contract that included 10 days of unpaid work and a 1 percent raise. In February 2014, PAT teachers again voted to strike, but the bargaining teams reached a contract at around 7 am on what would be the first day of the strike, averting any school closure. The bargain included an agreement to hire 150 teachers, and 2.3 percent annual raises for the next three years.

Teachers began negotiations with the district for a new contract months before their contract expired on June 30, 2023. In October 2023, the union voted on a strike. The vote closed on 19 October, with votes from 93 percent of the teachers. Of those who voted, 98.9 percent voted to authorize a strike. This commenced a 10 day work stoppage notice, after which a strike would commence if bargaining remained unsuccessful.

On October 30, Oregon Governor Tina Kotek issued a statement concerning the strike, urging both sides to reach an agreement while saying that "going out on strike is not in the best interest of students or families". Kotek said that state intervention in education funding was "really a conversation for 2025".

As PAT and PPS entered final mediation at the end of October, there was still a large gap between their offers on the negotiated issues. PAT proposed a cumulative 23 percent cost of living adjustment across 3 years against PPS's 10.9 percent proposal, and PAT proposed 440 minutes of planning time per week for elementary teachers against PPS's 400 minute proposal. PPS's chief of research claimed PAT's proposal would require the district to make $277 million in cuts.

This strike was preceded by several high-profile strikes in public education: teachers in Los Angeles Unified School District and Oakland, California, went on strike in spring of 2023.

== Strike ==
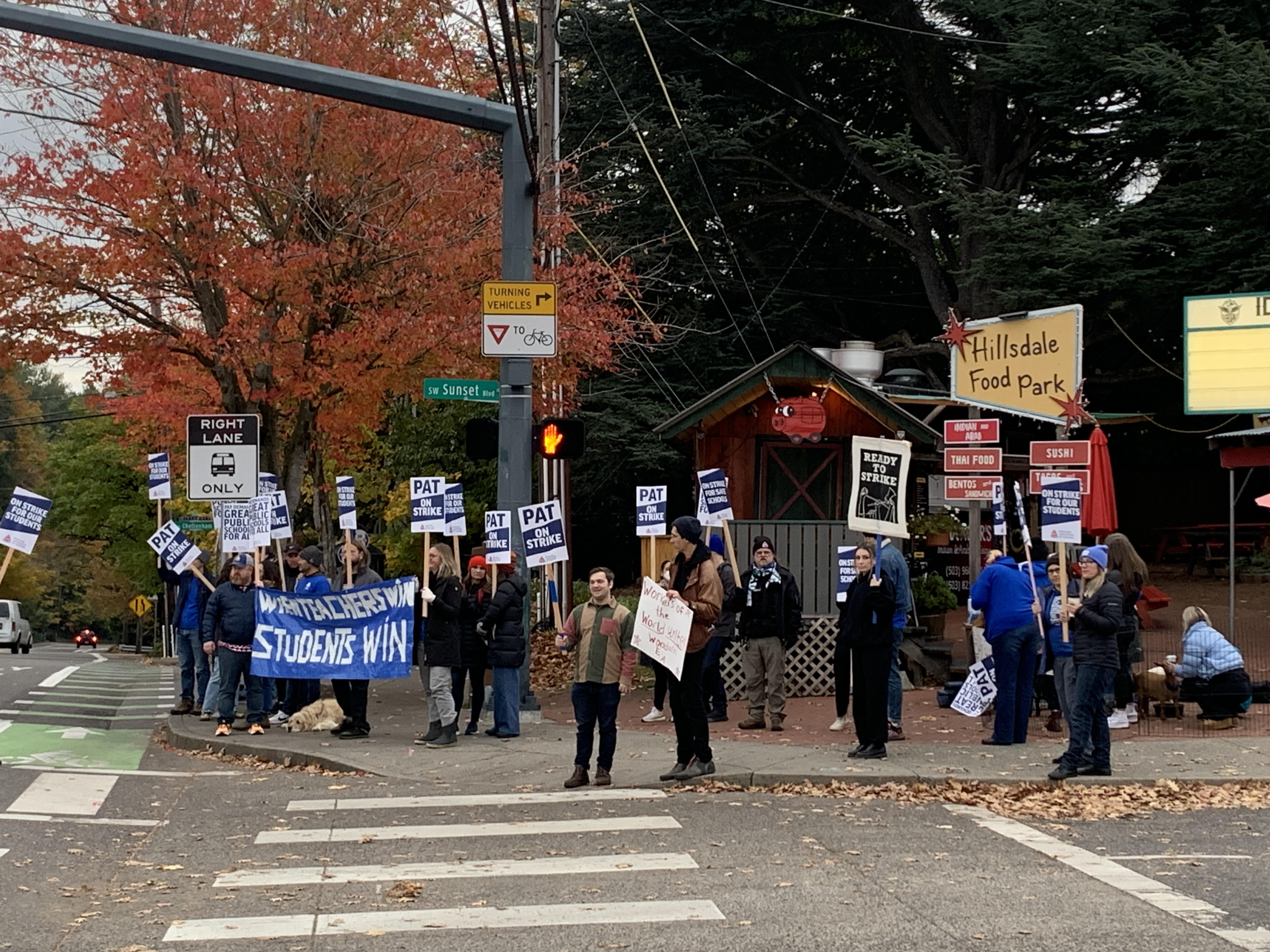
Teachers picketing near Ida B. Wells-Barnett High School on the first day of the strike.

The strike began on 1 November. The strike closed schools for the district's 45,000 students. On the first day of the strike, National Education Association president Rebecca Pringle and United Teachers Los Angeles president Cecily Myart-Cruz gave speeches to the striking teachers, outside Roosevelt High School.

On 8 November, Oregon's chief financial officer, Kate Nass, met with PAT and PPS bargaining teams. On 14 November, PAT provided a revised proposal in an attempt to reach a settlement. The proposal introduced cost-cutting measures such as a more flexible approach to class size reductions, adjustments to middle school planning time, and the removal of special education teacher stipends.

PPS and PAT reached a tentative agreement on 26 November. Teachers returned to schools the next day, after 11 cancelled days of instruction. On 28 November, PAT members voted to ratify the agreement, with votes from 93 percent of the teachers. Of those who voted, 94.7 percent voted in favor of the agreement. The same day, the school board unanimously voted to ratify the agreement. Under the tentative deal, teachers would receive a 13.8 percent cost-of-living adjustment across 3 years. Although the agreement did not set explicit limits on class sizes, it would put in place "decision-making committees involving educators and parents" to identify ways to address high class sizes at a school-level.
