= Irving W. Pratt =

American educator (1838–1908)

Irving Washington Pratt
- Born: 1838
- Died: 1908 (aged 69–70)
- Occupation: Educator
- Known for: Superintendent of Schools for Portland, Oregon (1891–1896); Prominent Freemason and Shriner
- Notable work: SS Irving W. Pratt (liberty ship named in his honor)

Irving Washington Pratt (1838–1908) was an educator in the U.S. state of Oregon. He was Superintendent of Schools for Portland, Oregon from 1891 to 1896. He was also a prominent Freemason and a Shriner.

The liberty ship SS Irving W. Pratt was named for him.
