= An Educational System for the Seventies =

An Educational System for the Seventies, sometimes abbreviated as ES'70 or ES-70, was a research effort in the United States to develop a new secondary school curriculum for the 1970s. It was jointly produced by 19 local school districts, their corresponding state agencies, and the U. S. Office of Education. The related report was published in 1969.

== Involved districts ==
- Atlanta, Georgia
- Baltimore, Maryland
- Bloomfield Hills, Michigan
- Boulder, Colorado
- Breathitt County, Kentucky
- Broward County, Florida - Nova High School
- Chicago (Archdiocese), Illinois
- Duluth, Minnesota
- Houston, Texas
- Mamaroneck, New York - Mamaroneck High School
- Mineola, New York - Mineola High School
- Monroe, Michigan
- Philadelphia - University City High School
- Portland, Oregon - John Adams High School
- Quincy, Massachusetts
- San Antonio, Texas
- San Mateo, California
- Santa Fe, New Mexico - Institute of American Indian Arts
- Willingboro Township, New Jersey - John F. Kennedy High School
