= James John High School =

Former public high school in St. Johns, Oregon, United States

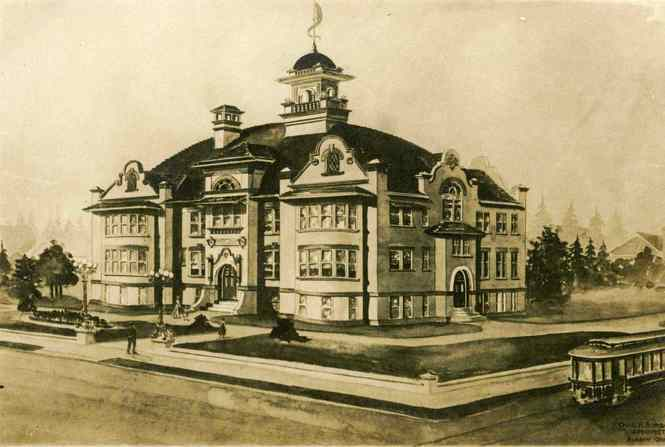
- St. Johns, Oregon (1911–15); Portland, Oregon (1915–23); United States

Information
- Opened: 1911
- Closed: 1923

James John High School was a public high school in the city of St. Johns, Oregon that later became part of Portland Public Schools after St. Johns was annexed to Portland in 1915. The school opened in 1911 and had four students in its first graduating class. It closed in 1923 after the completion of its replacement, Roosevelt High School. It was named for James John, the founder of the St. Johns settlement.

== History ==
Construction of James John High School began in Fall 1909. The building was completed in September 1910 at a cost $40,000 ($1,382,143 adjusted for inflation). In the school's first year, men's and women's basketball teams were formed. There were four students in the first graduating class in 1911. Other events at the school in 1911 included a meeting of the Multnomah County Teachers Institute and the formation and regular meetings of the St. Johns Commercial Club (starting on November 13).

In 1915, the James John High School athletic teams joined the Portland Interscholastic League following the annexation of the St. Johns School District to Portland Public Schools. The following year, James John graduated the largest class in its history, with 22 students receiving diplomas.

The school was temporarily closed in 1920 after it was condemned as unsafe. Students were sent to Jefferson High School during the school's rebuilding. The Portland City Council began searching for a new location for an updated James John High School, since the old school was not adequate. The new school was planned to be named James John High School, but following in the theme of other Portland high schools built in the era, it was named Roosevelt High School and dedicated in 1922. James John students moved to the completed Roosevelt High School building in January 1923. The old school building was gutted by fire in September 1934 after sitting vacant for a number of years. The building had been used to house grade school children until the present James John Elementary School was opened in 1929.
