= Alliance High School (Oregon) =

Public high school in Portland, Oregon, U.S.

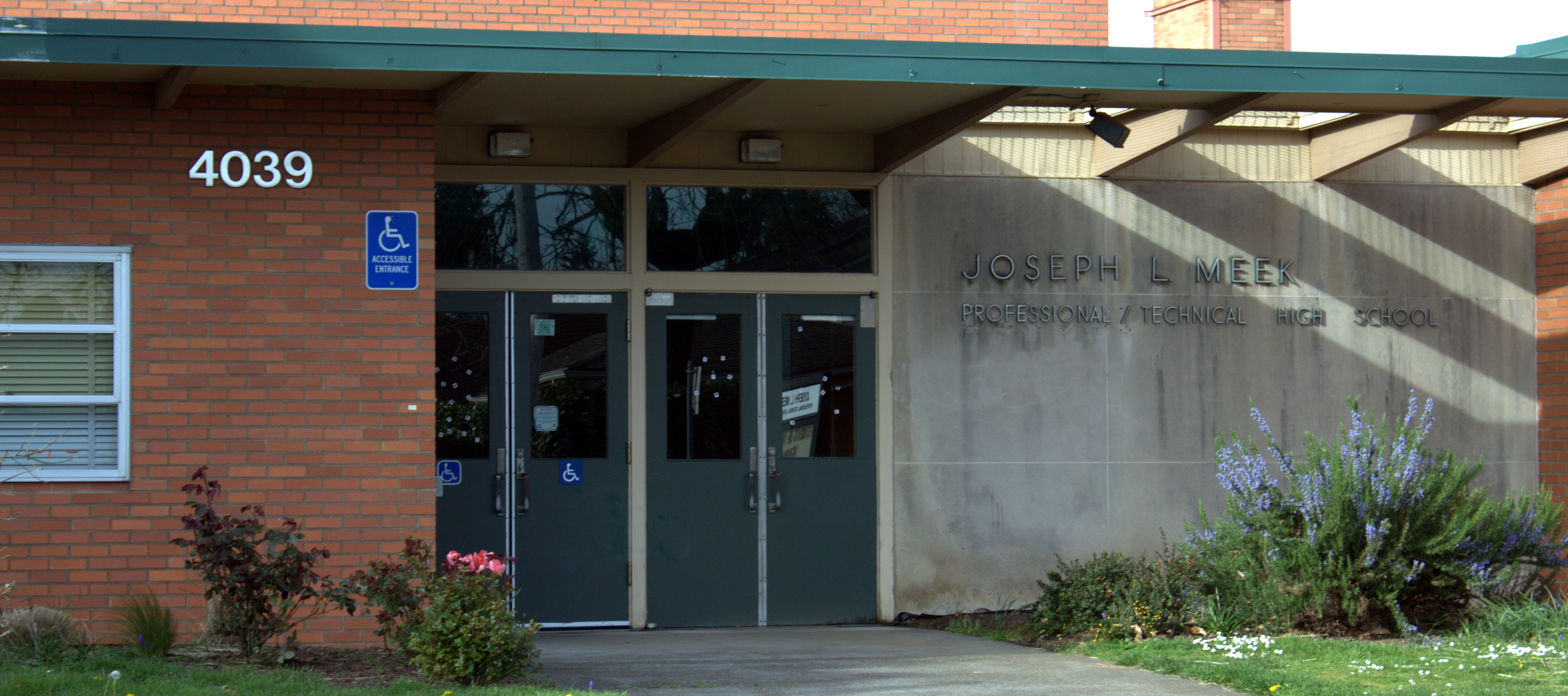

Location
- 1530 NE Glisan Street; Portland, Multnomah County, Oregon 97232; United States; 45.5261°N 122.6503°W

Information
- Type: Public
- School district: Portland Public Schools
- Principal: Dawn Joella Jackson
- Teaching staff: 24.50 (FTE)
- Grades: 9–12
- Enrollment: 193 (2023-2024)
- Student to teacher ratio: 7.88
- Website: alliance.pps.net

Alliance High School is a public alternative high school in Portland, Oregon, United States.

== History ==
In October 2009 the school was removed from the No Child Left Behind safety watch list, due to the following not occurring: "more than 1 percent of their students brought a weapon to school, were expelled for violence or committed a violent crime on campus."

The school moved to a new building at the beginning of the 2024–25 school year after being located at makeshift campuses for several years.
