= Jackson Middle School (Portland, Oregon) =

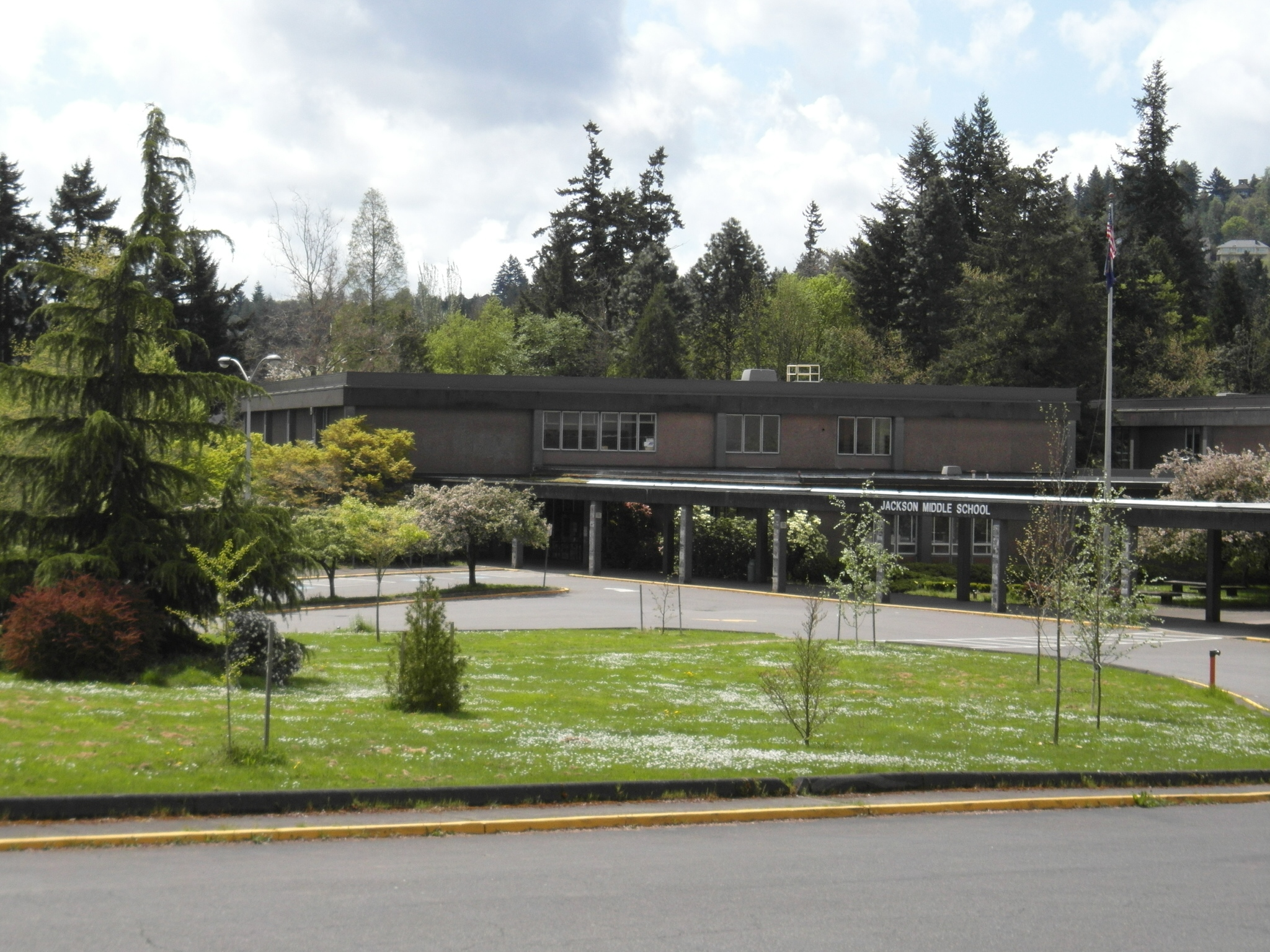

Location
- 10625 SW 35th Portland, Multnomah, Oregon 97219; United States
- Coordinates: 45.448478°N 122.714440°W

Information
- Former name: Jackson High School
- Type: Public
- Opened: 1987
- School district: Portland Public Schools
- Principal: John Ferraro
- Grades: 6–8
- Color: Red/Black
- Mascot: Jaguar
- Team name: Jackson Jaguars
- Newspaper: Jagwire
- Feeder schools: Capitol Hill Elementary; Maplewood Elementary; Markham Elementary; Stephenson Elementary
- Feeder to: Ida B. Wells High School
- Website: www.pps.net/jackson

Jackson Middle School (formally Andrew Jackson Middle School) is a public middle school in Portland, Oregon, United States. Originally opened as Jackson High School, the building sits on a 36-acre lot on SW 35th Avenue.

The high school closed in 1982 and was reopened as a middle school five years later, along with three new Elementary schools, due to an increase of students in the area.

== History ==
Jackson High School opened in 1966, but closed in 1982 due to low enrollment. This decision was made at the same time as the closures of Washington-Monroe High School and Adams High School.

In 1987, after five years of sitting unused, the building was reopened as a middle school. As of 2026 the school enrolls around 720 students from grades 6–8.

Jackson Middle School sits on the largest property in Portland Public Schools. Due to the excess space, the fields are used as an athletics hub for nearby schools. The school's curriculum uses the Artful Teaching philosophy.
