= Benson Polytechnic High School =

Public school in Portland, Oregon, U.S.

Location
- 546 NE 12th Avenue; Portland, Multnomah County, Oregon 97232; United States; 45.5273°N 122.6530°W

Information
- Type: Technical, Public
- Motto: "United by Spirit, Bonded by Name"
- Opened: September 4, 1917
- Founder: Simon Benson
- School district: Portland Public Schools
- NCES School ID: 411004000956
- Principal: Curtis Wilson Jr.
- Teaching staff: 58.20 (FTE)
- Grades: 9–12
- Enrollment: 896 (2024-2025)
- Student to teacher ratio: 15.40
- Colors: Beaver Orange and Royal Blue
- Athletics conference: OSAA 6A-1 Portland Interscholastic League
- Mascot: Astronaut
- Team name: Astros
- Rival: Jefferson High School
- Accreditation: NWAC
- Newspaper: The Benson Orbit
- Website: benson.pps.net
- Benson High School
- Portland Historic Landmark

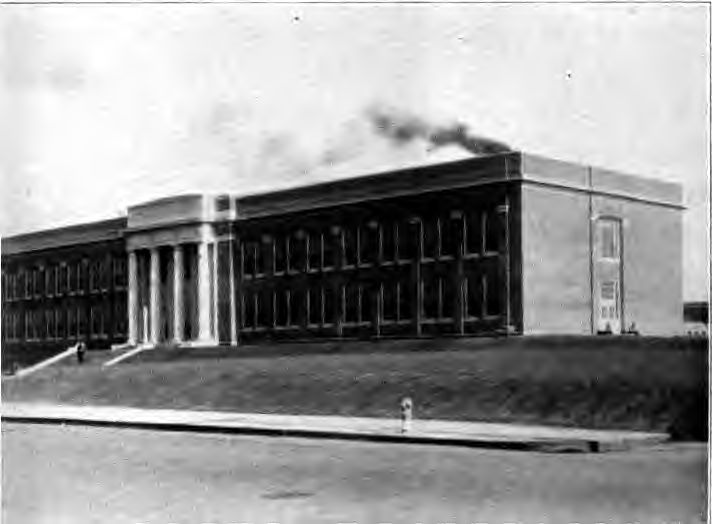
Benson Polytechnic High School around 1920

Benson Polytechnic High School (BHS) is a technical public high school in the Portland Public Schools district. Its 9-acre (3.6 ha) campus is located in the Central Eastside commercial area of Portland, Oregon, United States. Students are given a special emphasis in a technical area. The school is a member of SkillsUSA and Health Occupations Students of America.

== History of Benson Polytechnic ==
=== Benson's predecessor ===
Benson Polytechnic High School began in 1908 as the Portland School of Trades in the Atkinson Building at 11th and Davis in Northwest Portland. It was established to give "boys who wished to enter a trade a better opportunity than do shops and factories of the present time." Any boy from Portland who was at least fourteen years old, or who was a grammar school graduate, could attend. The course of study was three years. Students could also attend night school and/or summer sessions at the trade school.

In 1909, a course of study for girls was added, with classes in sewing, cooking, millinery, and homemaking. The Portland School of Trades was coeducational until 1913, when the girls' departments were moved to the original Lincoln High School.

=== Beginnings and World War I ===
The Portland School Board voted to change the school's name to Benson Polytechnic High School after civic leader and philanthropist Simon Benson gave $100,000 in 1915, with a stipulation that at least the same amount of money be spent by the Portland School District to start the school. Six blocks of land at Northeast 12th and Hoyt were purchased and a building was built, and the new Benson Polytechnic School opened its doors on September 4, 1917. The building was designed by Floyd Naramore. Portable classrooms were required early on and were still used into the 1970s.

Mr. Benson gave the student body $10,000 during World War I, and the first Tech Show was presented to the Portland community. Benson Polytechnic School grew rapidly in course offerings and in student population. In 1920, the printing department was set up and the school paper, the Tech Pep, was published.

In 1926, an aviation department was added to the school.

Benson Polytechnic School served not only the educational needs of the city's youth, but also the defense needs of a nation at war. Shortly after World War I, beginning in 1919, the federal government contracted with the school, and 50 disabled soldiers were educated.

=== KBPS radio ===
In May 1921, the Benson Polytechnic School received a government license to operate "Technical and Training School" station with the call sign 7YK. This station utilized a spark transmitter, which was limited to Morse code dot-and-dash transmissions. In October 1923, the student body was issued a license for an experimental station, 7XAD.

In the early 1920s broadcasting was introduced, and arrangements were made to establish a school station. Equipment previously used by a short-lived station, KYG, was purchased by the student body in March 1923, and an application filed for a new broadcasting station to be operated by the students under the direction of teacher Fred Brainard. A broadcasting station license, with the call letters KFIF, was issued on March 23, 1923, to the Benson Polytechnic Institute. Equipment tests were begun in April, followed by an informal debut broadcast at 6:00 p.m. on May 4, 1923. A more formal station introduction, coinciding with the start of the fifth annual Benson Technical Show, was broadcast from 9:30 to 10:30 p.m on May 9, with scheduled addresses by school director W. F. Woodward, Benson Tech principal C. E. Cleveland, and student body president Bill Norvell, plus singing by Marguerite Carney.

KFIF became KBPS in March 1930, and the District later took over ownership of the station. It has continued to this day to operate on the Benson Tech campus and to be staffed by Benson Tech students.

=== Expansion and World War II ===
By 1940, Benson Tech had 2,800 students and was the largest school in Portland.

Due to the baby boom and passing of a $25 million building levy by the school district in 1947, 29 portable buildings dating from World War I were scheduled for replacement.

=== Modern times ===
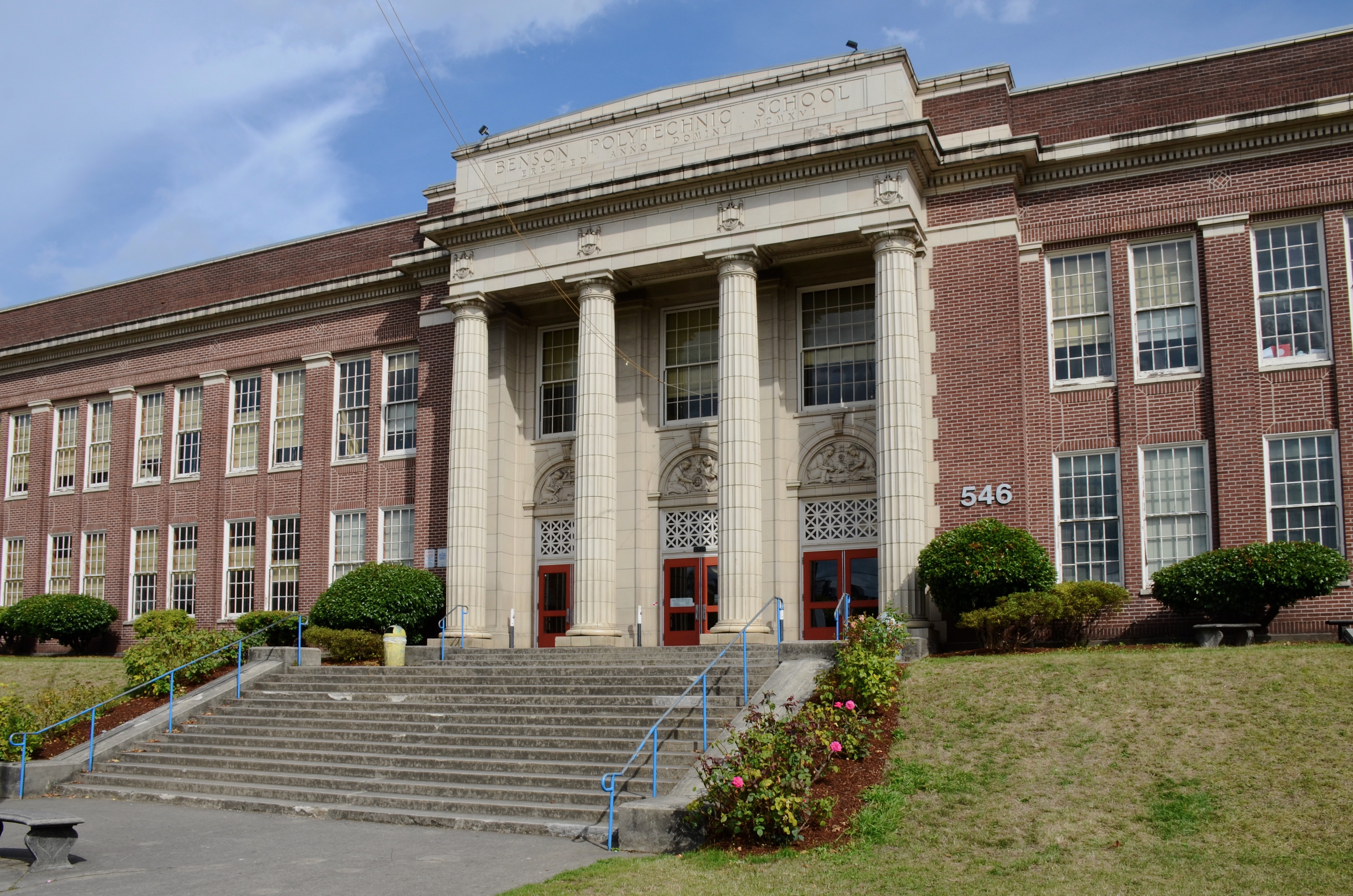
Main entrance to Benson Polytechnic High School. The inscription says Erected Anno Domini MCMXVI, meaning 1916 AD.

In 1953, the Portland School Board launched a five-year building program to upgrade Benson Tech. A library and automotive wing were completed in 1954. The north shop wing was remodeled in 1955 and the south shop wing in 1960. Benson Tech became co-educational once again in September 1973. Six females attended that year. When the health occupations program was moved from Washington High School to Benson Tech in 1980, Benson Tech's female population grew substantially.

An arson fire damaged offices and classrooms in the main section of Benson Tech on January 2, 1991. Coincidentally, the School Board had already scheduled the Benson Tech facility for major improvements. In 1991, a new health occupation wing, a new library, a new student services center, and a new band room were added, and halls and offices were modernized.

The school newspaper Tech Pep closed in 2010 after a 90-year run due to district budget cuts.

From 2021 to 2024, Benson Tech underwent a $416 million modernization. During the renovation, Benson Tech classes took place at the campus of the former John Marshall High School in Portland's Lents neighborhood. The school reopened on August 27, 2024.

In 2024, a new student newspaper, The Benson Orbit, formed as a club at Benson, and later became a class. The Orbit's first print issue was released in March 2026.

On September 8, 2026, a 15-year-old male student released a toxic chemical mixture of hydrogen sulfide and hydrogen cyanide in the school cafeteria shortly after the school day began, causing the school to be evacuated and leaving the teen critically injured. The teen was charged with 19 counts related to the incident on October 2, 2026, including 2 counts of domestic terrorism and 12 counts of attempted murder. The teen has not been publicly identified, and the case is currently ongoing.

== Academics ==
In 2008, 88% of the school's seniors received a high school diploma. Of 271 students, 239 graduated, 27 dropped out, and five stayed for a fifth year.

Oregon moved to the Cohort System the next year to identify graduates, which yields a lower rate than years previous. 76% of students graduated from Benson Tech in 2009, which was higher than the district average of 66%.

=== Student profile ===
As a magnet school, Benson Tech was highly selective in the Portland area until fairly recently. Students were once required to complete an application for admissions, but this is no longer the case due to the requirements of the No Child Left Behind Act; instead a lottery is used to determine which students are admitted. As of the fall of 2008, there were 1134 students enrolled in Benson Tech, and 61.7% qualified for free or reduced lunch.

In the 2017–2018 school year, Benson Tech's student population was 38.7% White, 25.5% Hispanic, 15.1% African American, 9.6% Asian, 0.6% Native American, 0.6% Pacific Islander, and 9.8% mixed race.

== Curriculum ==
=== Homebuilding program ===
Benson Tech is one of four Portland-area high schools (as well as Canby High School, Sherwood High School, and Forest Grove High School) that builds a single-family home in the community.

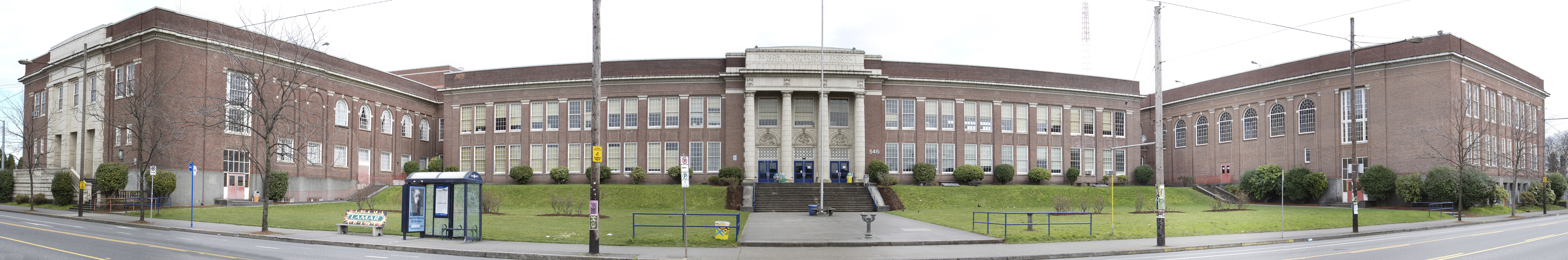
The front of Benson Polytechnic High School before the 2021 modernization

== Nickname and mascot ==
Aside from a gear, images of an astronaut or astronaut helmet have been used throughout Benson Tech's history. Students were traditionally called 'Techmen', and after women attended, 'Techsters' was used. In fall 2022, the students proposed to the school board that it was time to select a new name and mascot and a process of online voting was established. Whittled down to three, 'Astros' was selected and went before the PPS school board for ratification in May 2023 being approved for use in 2024 coinciding with the renovated building.

== Athletics ==
The school competes in a variety of sports, and has won numerous district and state championships. Benson Tech competes in the Portland Interscholastic League under 6A classification.

=== Men's Basketball Program ===
The men's basketball team has been one of the most successful programs in Oregon. Benson Tech has produced 30 plus D1 basketball recruits in program history. Some previous players have chosen to play at Hawaii, UCLA, USC, Nevada, Oregon State, Rhode Island, Stanford, and other schools. Three former players have been drafted into the NBA. Benson Tech has won state titles in 1971, 1973, 1974, 1981, 1990. Earl Clark has been head coach since 2013.

=== State championships ===
- Baseball: 1976
- Men's basketball: 1971, 1973, 1974, 1981, 1990
- Football: 1988
- Men's swimming: 1949
- Men's track and field: 1928, 1936, 1990, 1992, 1995, 2004
- Women's track and field: 1991, 1999, 2000, 2001, 2002, 2003, 2004
- Wrestling: 1927, 1928, 1929, 1930, 1931, 1932, 1933, 1936, 1939, 1982, 1983
- Women's basketball: 2019

== Notable alumni ==
- Aminé, rapper
- Arthur Chin, fighter pilot
- Tom Dodd, Major League Baseball player
- Jim Elliot, evangelical Christian killed in Ecuador on mission work
- A.C. Green, NBA player
- Alex Green, running back for the Green Bay Packers
- William A. Hilliard, former editor of The Oregonian
- Steve Horton, New York Times bestselling graphic novelist
- Matt Lattanzi, actor and dancer
- Chris Leben, wrestler; retired professional mixed martial art fighter, formerly for the UFC
- Joel David Moore, actor
- Alex Nimo, USSF Division 2 Professional League, Portland Timbers (USL)
- Kim Rhodes, actress
- Lendon Smith, pediatrician, author, and television personality
- Mfon Udoka, Nigerian Olympian
- Richard Washington, NBA, Kansas City Kings
- Andrew Andrews, pro basketball player
- Micah Williams, pro sprinter
