= John Outhouse =

American educator (1828–1889)

John T. Outhouse
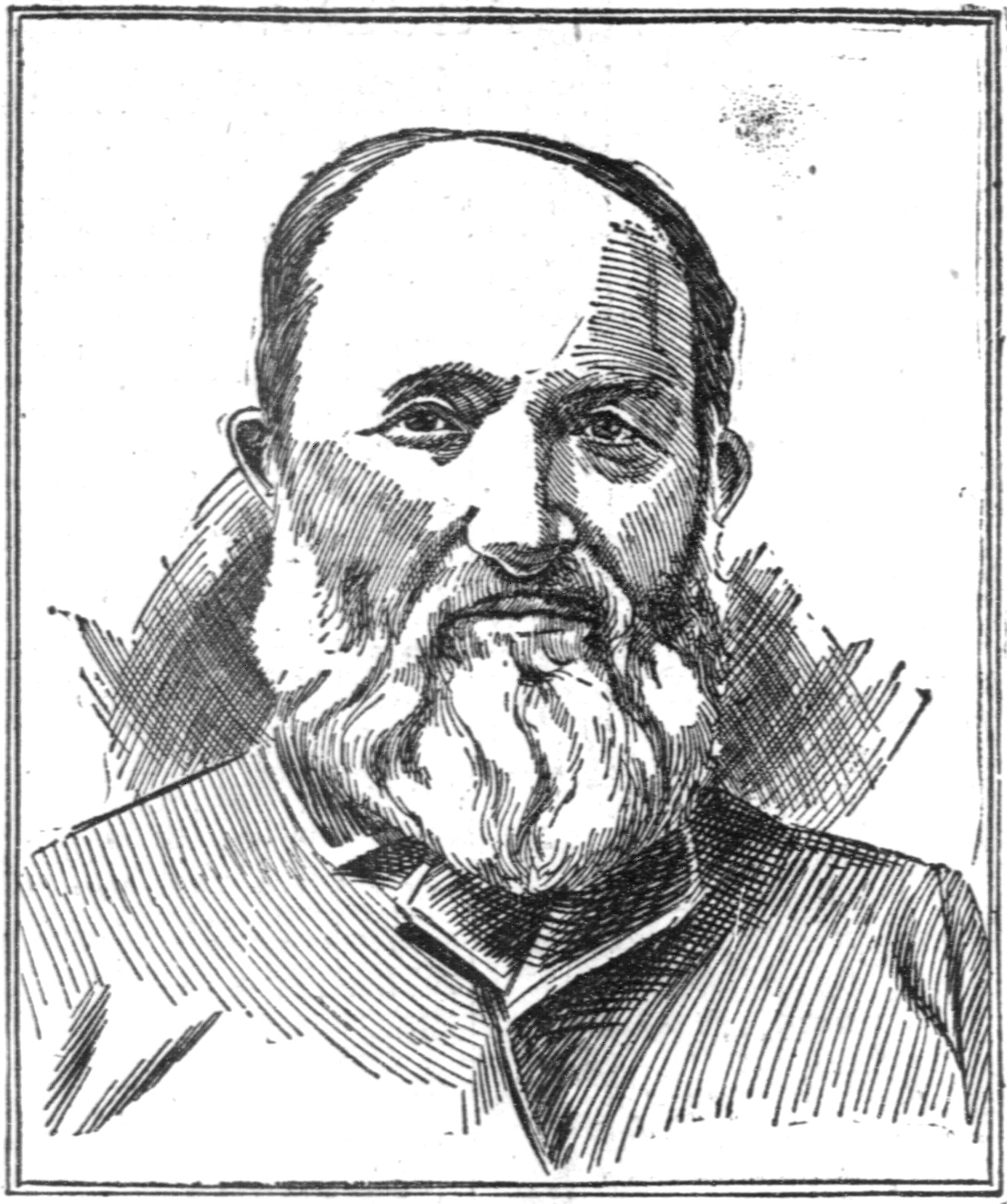
- Born: November 16, 1828; Nova Scotia
- Died: October 20, 1889 (aged 60); Grande Ronde Valley
- Occupations: Teacher and superintendent, Portland Public Schools (Oregon)

John T. Outhouse (November 16, 1828 – October 20, 1889) was the first public school teacher in Portland, Oregon. He taught in Portland from 1851 to 1853.

== Early life ==
Outhouse was born on November 16, 1828, in Nova Scotia, and moved to Portland in 1850, when he was 22.

== Teaching in Portland ==
The following year, Outhouse became the first public school teacher in Portland. In December 1851, the school board, which at the time consisted of Anthony L. Davis, Alonzo Leland, and Reuben P. Boise, appointed him to teach Portland's first public school, in a "little frame house" at the corner of SW First and Oak streets. The building was used for church gatherings as well as for classes. The following advertisement was published in The Oregonian on December 6, 1851:

In pursuance of a vote of the Portland school district at their annual meeting, the directors have established a free school. The first term will commence on Monday, the 15th inst., at the schoolhouse in this city, near the City Hotel. (John W. [sic] Outhouse, teacher.) The directors would recommend the following books to be used in the school, viz.: Sandler's Series of Readers and Spellers, Goodrich's Geography, Thompson's Arithmetics and Bullion's Grammar.

The school opened on December 15, with about 20 pupils, who came from as far away as Astoria. Outhouse's pupils included John Miller Murphy, who would later found The Washington Standard in 1860. His income for teaching was $100 per month, and he supplemented that by laying sidewalks and unloading ships. By 1852, the school was moved to a building on the corner of First and Taylor streets. Another teacher, Miss Abigail M. Clark was hired.

Outhouse retired from teaching in Portland in 1853. Soon after that, Sylvester Pennoyer, who had come from New York to Puget Sound and started an unsuccessful law firm, became the next schoolteacher of Portland Public Schools.

== Later life ==
On October 31, 1863, Outhouse attended a pro-Union rally in Dallas, Oregon. There, according to the Oregon Sentinel, Outhouse declared himself a "Union man," and that he was "equally opposed to Secession and Abolitionism."

In 1865, Outhouse married C. W. Cottel.

After teaching in Portland, Outhouse moved to Polk County, Oregon, and married. He later moved to La Grande, Oregon. In 1875 he was appointed Vice President of the newly formed Teacher's Institute in La Grande, where he presented on "his method of teaching English grammar in his usual happy way of illustration." He was appointed superintendent in 1880. He was described as an "unflinching democrat tree to his party" by the Eastern Oregon Republican newspaper. In 1885, he was appointed to the La Grande land office by President Grover Cleveland, and he held that position until his death.

In his later life, Outhouse had severe gout, and walked on crutches for several years. Although he had children, they all died young. He died in La Grande, on Wednesday, October 20 (or 28, or 29) 1889, survived by his wife.

== Legacy ==
In February 1959, to celebrate the hundredth anniversary of Oregon's statehood, an eighth grade class at Capital Hill School reenacted Outhouse's instruction at the Portland Schoolhouse.
