= Guadalupe Guerrero =

American school superintendent

Superintendent of Portland Public Schools
- In office August 11, 2017 – February 16, 2024
- Preceded by: Bob McKean
- Succeeded by: Sandy Husk (interim)

Assistant Superintendent of the San Francisco Unified School District
- In office 2010–2017

Personal details
- Education: University of California, Los Angeles; Harvard University

Guadalupe Guerrero is a former superintendent of Portland Public Schools in Oregon, and head of Partnership for Los Angeles Schools.

In 1992, Guerrero earned a BA degree in History at UCLA. He later earned two master's degrees from Harvard University, one in School Leadership and Principal Certification and one in Educational Policy and Management. Guerrero's first position was as a bilingual elementary school teacher in San Francisco. He was principal of Dever Elementary in Dorchester, Boston from 2002 until 2008, a school the Boston Post described as a "school in crisis" in 2002. While principal, he introduced a new math curriculum, and increased outreach to parents. However, in 2008, just 8 percent of fourth graders were proficient in math, with similar results in English proficiency. While in Boston, he also worked as a "cluster leader," training other principals. In 2008, he began a doctorate at the Harvard School of Education, but was terminated from the program in 2014 when he failed to finish his dissertation. In 2010, he became assistant superintendent of the San Francisco Unified School District, working out of Mission High School to better connect with schools in his target area. He held the post for two years. In 2012, he became Deputy Superintendent of instruction, innovation and social justice in the San Francisco Unified School District. He applied for the superintendent position of the Boston public schools in 2015, but was not hired.

Guerrero was appointed Superintendent of Portland Public Schools on August 11, 2017, the first Latino superintendent of the district. He announced at a press conference that he would focus on equity, supporting struggling schools, and preparing students to graduate. In October 2017, Guerrero proposed to disperse ACCESS Academy, a school specifically for highly gifted students, whose needs cannot met by neighborhood schools, between eight neighborhood schools. This plan was met with criticism, including student protests at both the PPS central office and at the Rose City Park School, causing Guerrero to apologize for not having "co-constructed a conversation" with ACCESS families. In December 2017, Guerrero also proposed he would relocate students to Pioneer, a school for children with behavior problems and disabilities, which was met with further protest. Guerrero subsequently backed off this plan as well, and on May 30, 2018 (notably, one week before the end of the school year), Guerrero and the school board voted to split the school in half, situating grades 1–5 at Vestal Elementary School and grades 6-8 seven miles away at Lane Middle School. This move was promised to be "temporary," and Guerrero and the school board gave assurances that reuniting ACCESS Academy would be a priority in their next round of school balancing.

In 2023, Guerrero announced his resignation as Superintendent, effective February 16, 2024. Following his departure, the Partnership for Los Angeles Schools, an organization dedicated to helping students from underserved schools in the Los Angeles Unified School District, named Guerrero as their new CEO. He was replaced as PPS superintendent by Dr. Kimberlee Armstrong, former deputy superintendent of Evergreen Public Schools in Vancouver, WA.
