= Leodis V. McDaniel High School =

Public school in Portland, Oregon, U.S.

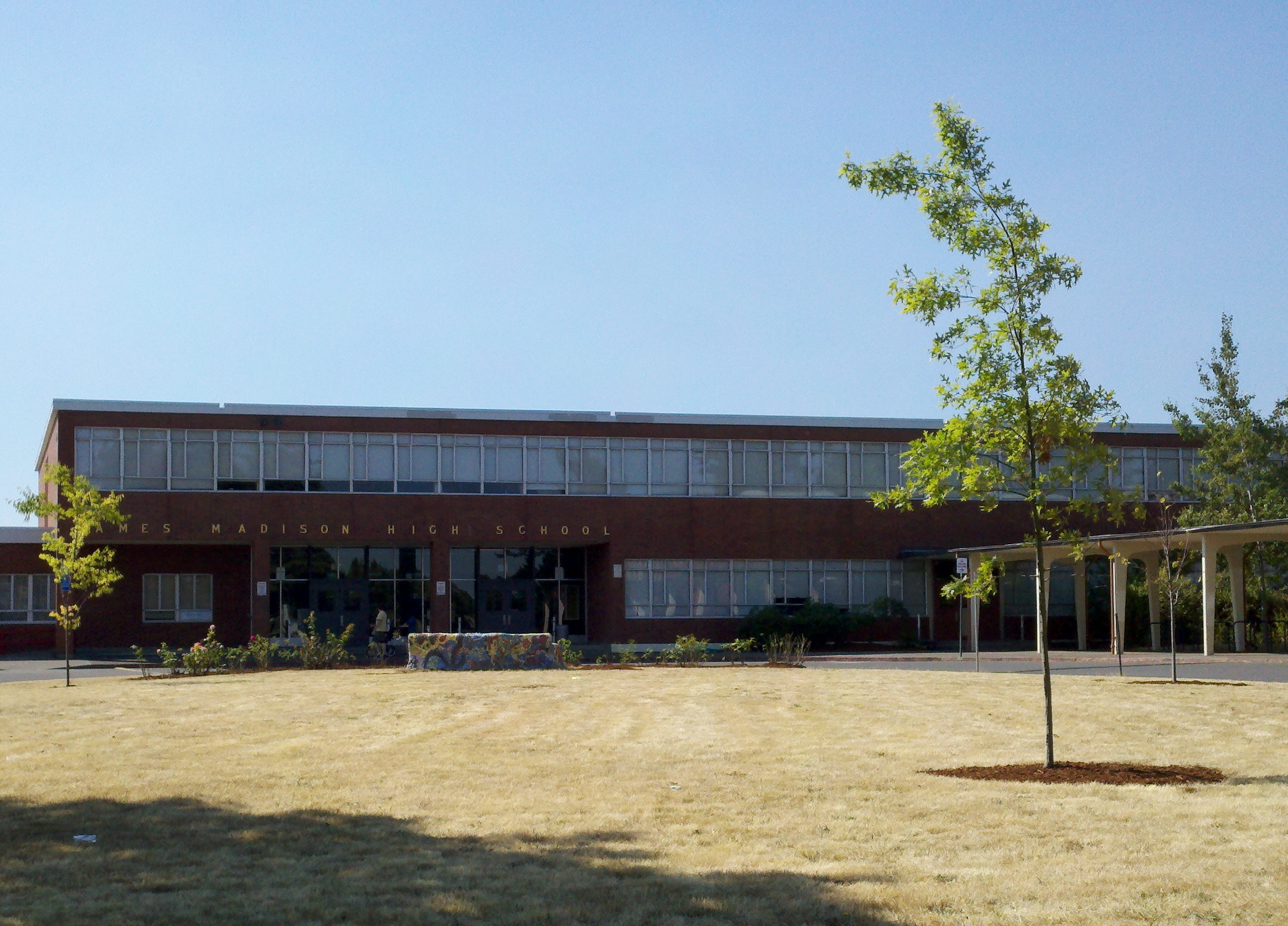

Location
- 2735 Northeast 82nd Avenue; Portland, (Multnomah County), Oregon 97220; United States; 45.54222°N 122.579924°W

Information
- Type: Public
- Opened: 1957
- School district: Portland Public Schools
- Teaching staff: 98.65 (FTE)
- Grades: 9–12
- Enrollment: 1,681 (2024–2025)
- Student to teacher ratio: 17.04
- Colors: Columbia blue and red
- Athletics conference: OSAA 6A-1 Portland Interscholastic League
- Team name: Mountain Lions
- Newspaper: The Oracle
- Feeder schools: Roseway Heights Middle School; Harrison Park Middle School; Faubion K–8; Vernon K–8
- Website: mcdaniel.pps.net

Leodis V. McDaniel High School (colloquially McDaniel High School) is a public high school located in northeast Portland, Oregon, United States.

== History ==
The high school was founded in 1957 as Madison High School, named after Founding Father James Madison. Construction on the campus began in 1955. Teacher Leodis V. McDaniel became the principal of the school in 1983, and remained until his death in 1987.

On June 29, 2004, the school was damaged by fire, probably caused by fireworks.

The school was renovated in 2019–2021 as part of a $790 million bond measure passed in 2017. Classes took place at the former Marshall High School in Portland's Lents neighborhood during the renovation. During the renovations, the school board began a process to re-name the school, as Madison had been a slaveholder.

On February 24, 2021, Portland Public School Board voted to rename Madison High School after McDaniel, who was well respected in the community. In April 2021, the school mascot was changed from the Senators to the Mountain Lions.

== Curriculum ==
McDaniel High School offers a full range of college preparatory core content classes as well as unique elective options in the areas of mathematics, performing & visual arts, science, social science, psychology, craftsmanship, and world languages. Students may challenge themselves by enrolling in Advanced Placement and dual credit courses. The latter are taught by McDaniel faculty who work in partnership with Portland Community College.

== Athletics ==
McDaniel High School athletic teams compete in the OSAA 6A-1 Portland Interscholastic League, 6A being the highest division in the OSAA.

=== State championships ===
- Baseball: 1963, 1964, 1969, 1970, 1981, 1997
- Boys Golf: 1970, 1975
- Boys Track and Field: 1986†

(†=Tied with one or more schools)

== Notable alumni ==
- Leslie A. Baxter, educator
- Craig Berkman, politician
- Kent Bottenfield, Major League Baseball player
- Brian Cole (bass guitarist), member of The Association
- Paul J. De Muniz, first Hispanic Chief Justice of the Oregon Supreme Court
- Rob Dressler, Major League Baseball player
- Terry Ley, Major League Baseball pitcher
- John Minnis, politician
- Jim Pepper, musician
- Billy Rancher, musician
- Rick Wise, last Major League Baseball pitcher to pitch a no-hitter and hit a home run in the same game
