= Roosevelt High School (Oregon) =

Public school in Portland, Oregon, U.S.

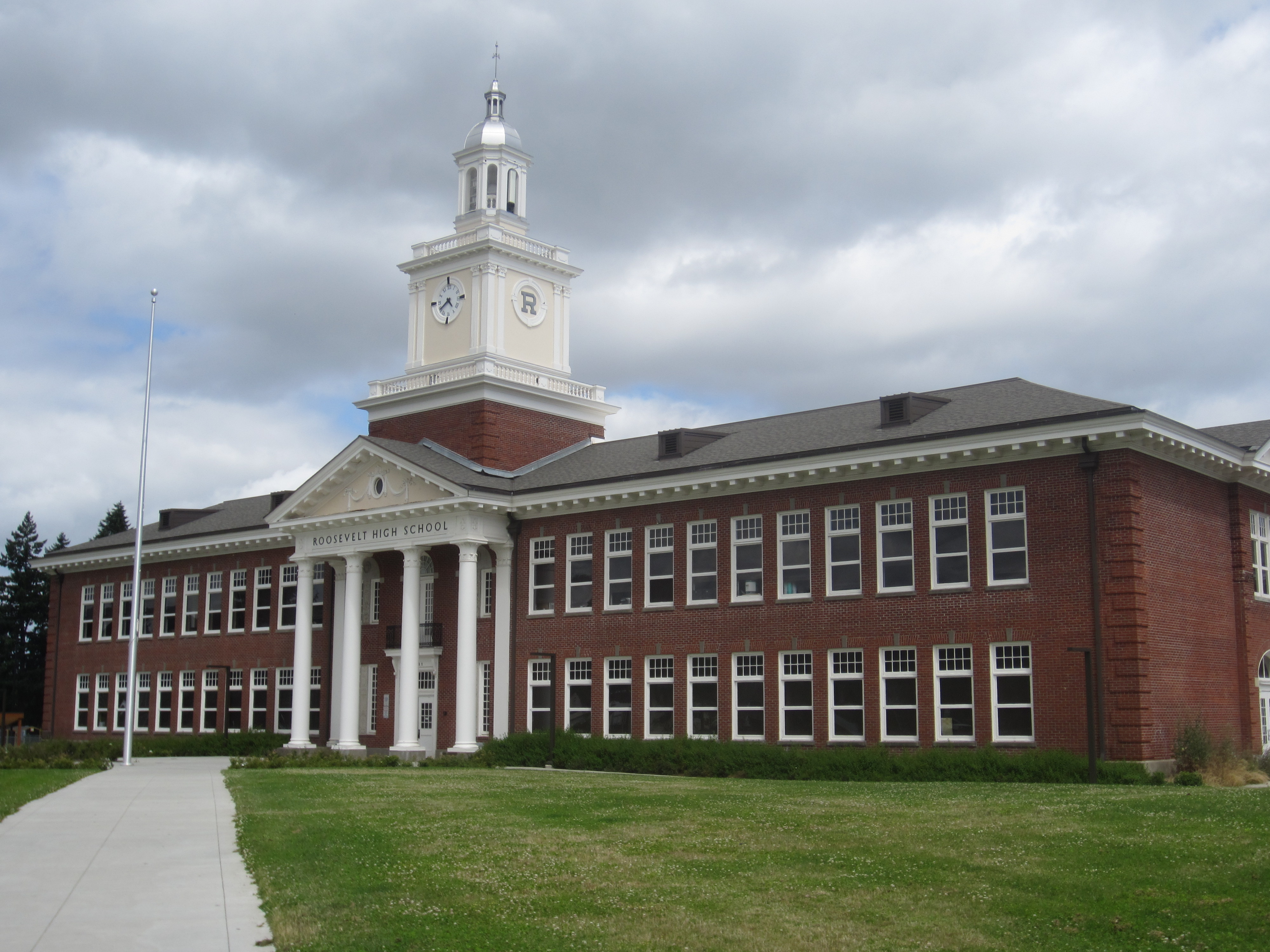
- The school's front exterior in 2019

Location
- 6941 North Central Street; Portland, Oregon 97203; United States; 45.5894°N 122.7382°W

Information
- Type: Public
- Opened: 1922
- School district: Portland Public Schools
- Principal: KD Parman
- Grades: 9–12
- Enrollment: 1,452 (2024)
- Colors: Black and gold
- Athletics conference: OSAA Portland Interscholastic League 6A
- Mascot: Roughriders
- Rival: Grant High School
- Feeder schools: Astor K–8; Cesar Chavez K–8; Faubion K–8; George Middle School; Ockley Green Middle School
- Website: roosevelt.pps.net

Roosevelt High School (RHS) is a public high school in Portland, Oregon, United States. It is located in the St. Johns neighborhood.

== History ==
Roosevelt High School opened in the St. Johns neighborhood of Portland in 1922 as a replacement for James John High School. James John High School – named after James John, the founder of the St. Johns settlement – was constructed in 1911 when St. Johns was still a separate city from Portland. The school became a part of Portland Public Schools after St. Johns was annexed to Portland in 1915. James John High School was temporarily closed in 1920 due to safety concerns, and the Portland school board decided to rebuild the school at a new location. The new building was initially referred to as "the new James John high school", but the Portland school board later voted to name the school in honor of President Theodore Roosevelt, who had died in 1919.

Construction of the Roosevelt High School building began in December 1921. The new building was dedicated in June 1922, with efforts being made to complete its construction in time for the school's opening in September. The building, which was modelled after the design of Franklin High School, had 24 rooms and a capacity of 1,200 students. While James John only had an enrollment of 400 students in its final year, enrollment at Roosevelt was expected to be much higher, as it would be taking surplus students from Jefferson and Lincoln high schools.

Builders anticipated in August 1922 that Roosevelt would be ready for use by early winter. A 1922 St. Johns Review article called for the streets surrounding Roosevelt High School to be paved so that fire trucks and other vehicles would be able to access the school more easily. Inclement weather extended construction through the winter of 1922. The building was finished in early January 1923 at a cost of $300,000. James John High School students moved to the Roosevelt building in late-January, soon after returning from winter break. The Roosevelt "Rough Riders" played their first game on January 30, 1923.

During World War II, high school students from the nearby Vanport housing project attended Roosevelt. The Oregonian referred to Roosevelt in 1944 as Portland's "No. 1 war boom high school". Roosevelt was described as Portland's "worst crowded high school" in 1950, with needs including the completion of a wing already under construction and the addition of a new gymnasium.

In 1986, Roosevelt became the site of the first school-based health center in Oregon. The Multnomah County Health Department decided to open a clinic at the school due to the high rates of teen pregnancies, low income students, and kids without health insurance in the surrounding area. This decision sparked protests among some residents, who argued that providing birth control would encourage sexual activity among students.

In 1992, Roosevelt became one of six Oregon high schools to pilot a school-to-work training program described by The New York Times as "one of the most aggressive efforts in the country to address shortcomings in job training". The program required sophomores to choose one of six career tracks and emphasized career-related applications in academic course work. The program was praised by some, who cited Roosevelt's lower dropout rate once the program was implemented, but criticized by others, who argued that it forced students to make career decisions at too young of an age.

Between 1995 and 2002, Roosevelt maintained a relatively constant enrollment of about 1,100 to 1,200 students, but dipped to an enrollment of less than 1,000 in the 2002–03 school year and less than 900 in the 2003–04 school year. Education scholar John Ambrosio attributed this decline to the 2001 No Child Left Behind Act (NCLB).

In 2004, Roosevelt was split into 3 small schools: the Pursuit Of Wellness Education at Roosevelt (POWER), the Spanish-English International School (SEIS), and the Arts, Communication, and Technology School (ACT). Each small school focused on certain academic and career-related pathways: POWER focused on math and science, SEIS focused on language immersion, and ACT offered courses in fine, visual, and performing arts. The rationale behind the split was to improve academic achievement by allowing teachers and students to interact in a more intimate and specialized environment.

Roosevelt received a $7.7 million federal grant in the summer of 2010 to improve school conditions and to return the school to a comprehensive campus by 2012. This was done to promote diversity in the classrooms and unite the school budget.

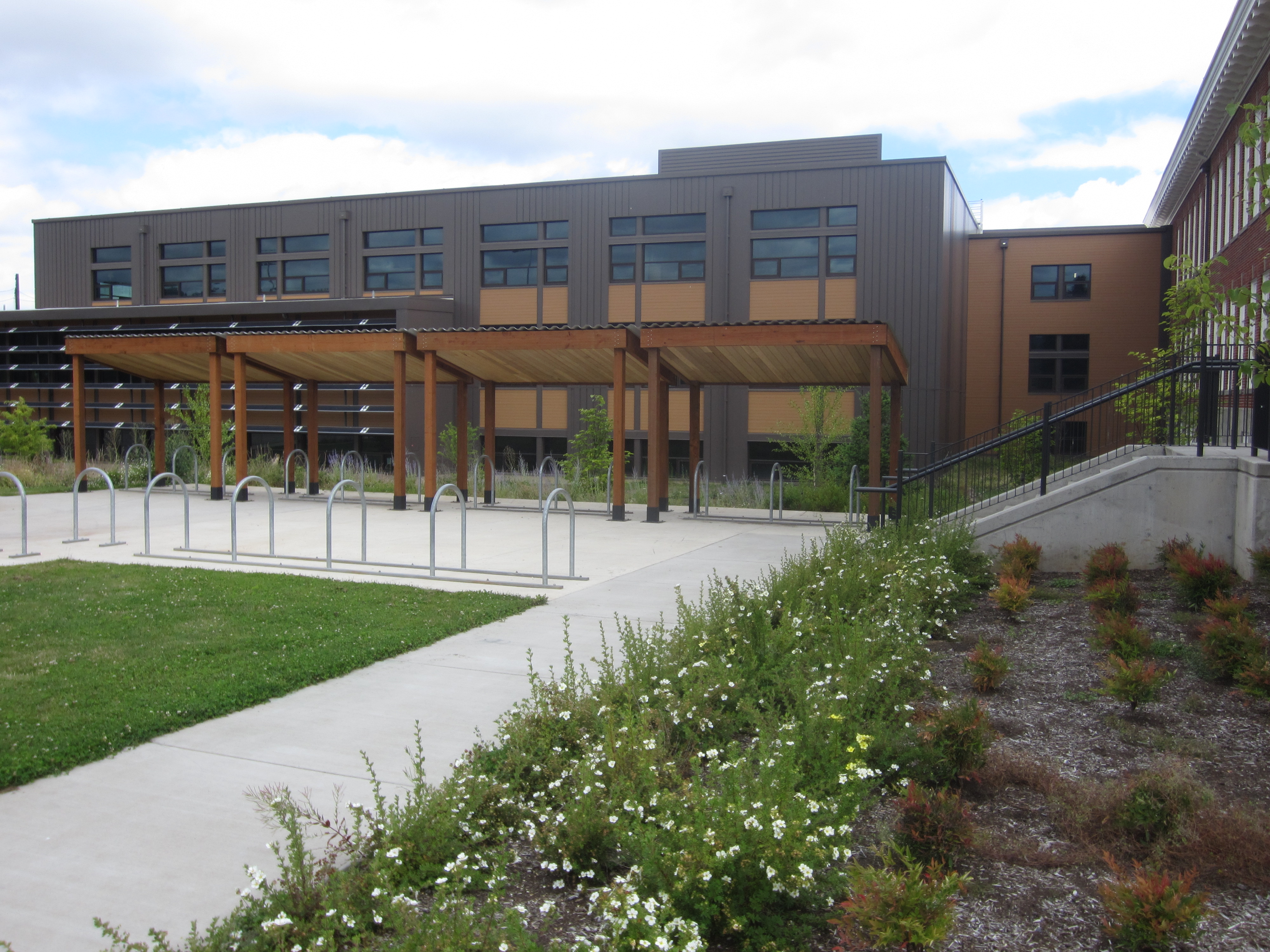
Exterior of the added wing, 2019

Roosevelt began a modernization process in 2015 as part of a $482 million bond measure aimed at improving schools across Portland. The project included a new wing for the school – with a community center, gymnasium, and commons area, among other additions – and renovations to the original 1921 structure. The modernization project was praised by the Business Tribune, which cited its "intertwining benefits of seismic stabilization, historic preservation and improved learning environments". Renovations to the historic 1921 building were completed in 2017.

== School profile ==
In 2024, Roosevelt's student population was 37.3% Latino, 35.2% White, 13.2% Black, 1.7% Asian, 1.5% Pacific Islander, 0.5% Native American, 2.2% Asian/White, and 8.5% other ancestries. The school had an enrollment of 1,452 students in October 2024.

In 2024, 70% of Roosevelt's seniors graduated on time out of a class size of 354.

== Athletics ==
Roosevelt High School athletic teams compete in the Oregon School Activities Association's 6A-1 Portland Interscholastic League district, the highest division and league in the OSAA.

=== State championships ===
- Baseball: 1949
- Basketball: 1949
- Boys' Track and Field: 1935

== Notable alumni ==
- James Allen (class of 1946), pioneer of early Portland television
- Kenneth E. BeLieu (class of 1933), United States Under Secretary of the Army from 1971 to 1973
- Carolyn Davidson (class of 1960), designer of Nike's trademark "Swoosh"
- Joe Gray (class of 1934), American football player
- Illmaculate, battle rapper and hip hop artist
- John Henry Merryman (class of 1938), scholar of comparative law and art law.
- Anna Peterson (class of 1965), mayor of Salem, Oregon, from 2011 to 2016
- Robert Robideau, member of the American Indian Movement and participant in the Wounded Knee incident
- Mike Schrunk, Multnomah County District Attorney from 1981 to 2012
- Terry Schrunk (class of 1932), mayor of Portland from 1957 to 1972
- Pennie Lane Trumbull (class of 1972), socialite, philanthropist, and businesswoman
- Keith Wilson, mayor of Portland
- Len Younce (class of 1936), National Football League player
