= Ida B. Wells-Barnett High School =

Public school in Portland, Oregon, United States

Ida B. Wells High School
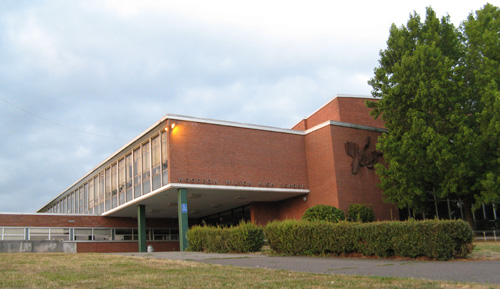

Location
- 1151 SW Vermont Street; Portland, (Multnomah County), Oregon 97219; United States; 45.4768°N 122.6898°W

Information
- Former name: Woodrow Wilson High School
- Type: Public
- Motto: "Lifting as we climb"
- Opened: 1956
- School district: Portland Public Schools
- Principal: Ayesha Coning
- Grades: 9–12
- Enrollment: 1,540 (2021–2022)
- Colors: Forest green and white
- Athletics conference: OSAA Portland Interscholastic League 6A-1
- Team name: Guardians
- Rival: Lincoln High School
- Feeder schools: Jackson Middle School; Robert Gray Middle School
- Website: ibw.pps.net

Wells High School (officially Ida B. Wells-Barnett High School) is a public high school in Portland, Oregon, United States. The school is located in the center Hillsdale neighborhood next to Rieke Elementary. The boundary includes most of Southwest Portland excluding Downtown. From its founding in 1956 until 2021 it was called Woodrow Wilson High School (colloquially Wilson High School).

== History ==
The school was built in 1956, after a ballot measure was passed in 1945 providing $5 million to improve Portland's school system. Population was growing explosively, so emphasis was put on economy and ease of building, instead of on architectural style as was the norm in the earlier school buildings. The building was designed by the firm Edmundson and Kochendoerfer and lift-slab construction was used to speed up construction. Wilson High School was the first building in the Northwest to use that technique.

In July 2020, Portland Public Schools pledged to rename Wilson High School in response to pressure from the community in light of the racial justice movement that followed the murder of George Floyd, due to the pro-segregation policies and pro-Ku Klux Klan sympathies of President Woodrow Wilson for whom the school was named. In January 2021, the name was changed to Ida B. Wells-Barnett High School, in honor of Ida B. Wells. The mascot was also changed from the Trojans to the Guardians (represented by an owl).

== Notable alumni ==
- Kenji Bunch, violist and composer
- Ginny Burdick, communications consultant and member of the Oregon State Senate
- Boaz Frankel, television personality
- Peter Gassner, CEO and co-founder of Veeva Systems, a company supporting processes in the pharmaceutical industry
- David Gilkey, nationally recognized photojournalist and war correspondent
- Alicia Lagano, actress
- Paul Linnman, television news reporter and anchor; radio personality
- Dale Murphy, professional baseball player, 7-time All-Star, twice National League MVP
- Gabriel Pascuzzi
- William "BJ" Prendergast, US Army Major General who served as commander over US Army Africa (USAFRICOM) and Oregon National Guard
- Damon Stoudamire, basketball player and coach, 1996 NBA Rookie of the Year
- Wayne Twitchell, professional baseball player
