= Adams High School (Oregon) =

Former school in Oregon, United States

John Adams High School

Location
- Portland, Oregon 97218; United States
- Coordinates: 45.5637607°N 122.6226227°W

Information
- Type: Public high school
- Opened: 1969
- Closed: 1981
- School district: Portland Public Schools

John Adams High School was a public high school in Portland, Oregon, United States, managed by Portland Public Schools (PPS). Located at 5700 N.E. 39th Avenue (now Cesar Chavez Blvd.), Portland, Oregon, the school opened in 1969. Its curriculum, based on ES-70 and further developed by students and faculty at Harvard Graduate School of Education, had a unique and sometimes controversial approach to secondary education.

== Approach to education ==
When Adams opened, there were many ways that it differed from a normal high school. The school was organized into four different sub-schools, or "houses", each with a multiple-discipline and general education focus, including a blend of students from all grades. The general education classes gave students the opportunity to debate current events, such as pollution or automation. By studying these concepts, students would learn science and the humanities through hands-on learning about topics relevant to them. Students were given the choice of selecting elective classes and were also offered the opportunity to gain educational experiences outside of the classroom, many of which were vocational classes. The governance of the school was inspired by the system of the United States government, with an executive, judicial, and legislative branch. This gave students and teachers the power to override the principal on decisions. Classes would also not be tracked. Counselors and secretaries would be a part of the four houses, and would interact regularly with students. 20 of the initial faculty members did not even have degrees in Education.

== Students and staff ==
Adams pulled students from areas that had previously been in the neighborhoods of Madison, Jefferson, and Grant high schools, which were 1%, 41%, and 9% African American, respectively. According to The Oregonian, "Integration of Portland's High Schools... will be expedited in the fall with the opening of John Adams High School."

Robert Schwartz, one of the Harvard graduates who founded the school, was appointed principal.

== Closure and fate of the campus ==
As student enrollment fell, the school closed in 1981.

In 1983, Whitaker Middle School moved to the former Adams building from another location. However, the building, then referred to by PPS as the Whitaker-Adams site, closed again in mid-2001, with Whitaker students moved to two other facilities, one of which was Whitaker's original location at 5135 N.E. Columbia Blvd., referred to as the Whitaker-Lakeside site (which closed again in June 2005, the property sold by PPS to the Native American Youth and Family Center, or NAYA). In 2002, the vacant Whitaker-Adams campus, on 39th Avenue, was used in the filming of the 2003 movie, Elephant.

The entire school campus eventually became contaminated with toxic black mold and radon gas. It was subsequently demolished in 2007 and currently the site is an empty lot. However, the original track and field remains and is still in use.
