= James John =

Founder of St. Johns, Oregon

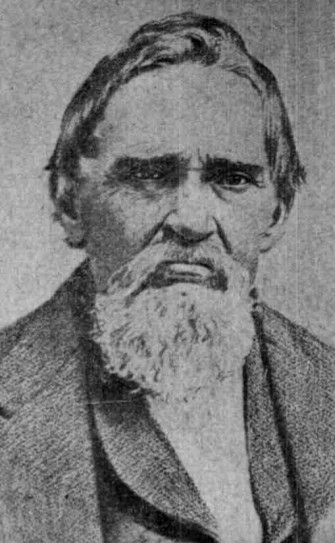
- Born: 1809; Donnelsville, Ohio
- Died: May 28, 1886 (aged 76–77); Multnomah County, Oregon
- Other names: Jimmy John, St. John
- Occupations: educator, fisherman, ferry operator, merchant
- Known for: founding the settlement of St. Johns, Oregon (1846); Bartleson–Bidwell Party (1841–43)

James John (1809–1886) was founder of the settlement of St. Johns in Oregon. The area later became a city when it passed a charter in 1902. It was annexed into Portland in 1915. John worked as a general store and ferry operator across the Willamette River to Linnton. He once served as Justice of the Peace and was twice an election judge. John was born in Ohio and first settled in Indiana with his wife and child where John worked as an educator. He joined the Bartleson–Bidwell Party in 1841, who were one of the first groups that trekked the California Trail. By this time, John's wife and child had died. He came to Oregon Country in the employment of the Hudson's Bay Company in 1843 after making it to Sacramento Valley.

Following John's death in 1886, his estate was executed by Philip T. Smith who met court injunctions from John's sister and niece. Smith was replaced as executor by Robert Catilin who battled John's relatives until 1907 when the estate was finally settled. In John's will and testament he gave a large portion of his property towards the erection of a new public school for St. Johns and designated his personal effects liquidated and the funds be used for building materials. His only condition for the school was that it not be related to any religious "sect". In 1907, Catilin ordered the City of St. Johns to forfeit the land given to them by John, but gave them a small portion of the land to erect a school on. James John High School opened in 1911 and closed in 1921.

== Biography ==
James John was born in Donnelsville, Ohio in 1809. He first settled in Lafayette, Indiana and worked as an educator before moving to Oregon by way of California. John was a widower in Indiana and never remarried. His son also died in Indiana.

=== Missouri to California (1841–43) ===
While working for John Bidwell as a part of the Bartleson–Bidwell Party starting in 1841, John became one of the first people who made the California Trail trek. He was of the first people on the expedition from Missouri to California when he left on May 16, 1841. Like all member of the crew, John was required to keep a journal but as noted in Nancy Kelsey's documents, John often neglected his writings. Two days after leaving, John was delayed when his oxen strayed. Later that day he met up with Bidwell and his party. On May 20, they reached the Kansas River and were assisted across by Native Americans who floated their items to the other shore. The next day they were invited to a Pawnee festivity where they smoked a calumet, what John described as the "peace pipe".

During their time crossing the Rocky Mountains, John and Bidwell were trapped at the top of a peak and were forced to walk down the mountain in the dark, with their moccasins shredded from sharp rocks. They eventually reached a Native American settlement where they made camp. One of John's primary jobs on the journey was to acquire fish, trout being one of the parties preferences. Bidwell referred to John as "Jimmy". John went a separate route from Bidwell to get to Sutter's Fort in present day Sacramento, California which made him one of the first members of the party to finish the journey.

=== Oregon (1843–1886) ===
When he completed his journey to California in 1843 he accepted a job with the Hudson's Bay Company at Fort Vancouver in Oregon territory. On July 2, 1844 John wrote in his journal that he camped across the Willamette River from Linnton, Oregon which was likely the present day site of St. Johns. He resided in Linnton for the first few years where he intended to build a warehouse. However, he moved across the river established the settlement of "St. Johns" in 1845 by plotting a homestead. Land claim records were filed with Clackamas County in 1846 and 1848. By then, a dozen families had made St. Johns their home.

John was known to offer warm meals to hungry people and even land to the homeless. He established a general store in 1850 and a rowboat ferry service across the Willamette River to Linnton in 1852. On April 5, 1853 John received a ferry licence from the Clackamas County recorder. John was elected the settlement's Justice of the Peace in 1870. He was a member of the Republican Party. In 1870, John constructed derricks for the United States Customs Service office in Portland. In 1876 and 1877, John fellow St. Johns resident B. O. Severence served as the settlement's election judges. In 1874, John heard rustling in his orchard and fired what he said was a warning shot that hit a 15-year-old boy in the leg. John said he regretted firing the weapon and requested to be placed at the Portland jail, which was granted for one night. When the case was brought before a grand jury John was acquitted of all charges.

==== Death and estate ====
On May 28, 1886, John was found dead in his bedroom. The coroner said John succumbed to "natural causes". He was discovered by his neighbor T. D. Taylor who recalled the incident, "This morning at 8 o'clock [am] I went and rapped on Mr. John's door and received no answer. I returned again between 11 and 12 o'clock as I wished to see him on business. I got no reply. I then went and called Mr. Crooks and told him I though something was wrong. We returned together and knocked at the door and still received no answer. We then placed some boxes beneath the window of his bedroom. Mr. Crooks got up there and noticed John lying in his bed, dead." John was 77 years old at the time of his death. Prior to 1904, James John's grave had no headstone. Citizens of the newly incorporated City of St. Johns funded the marker on his grave site at Historic Columbian Cemetery on Columbia boulevard.

John's will was signed and dated on March 14, 1883. It called for his personal property to be sold and his property be leased for a period no longer than 15 years. One plot of land was set dedicated to a public school for St. Johns. John's document read, "[the school] shall be public and open to the children of the school district, which shall embrace the town of St. Johns [...] It is not my intention to direct the particular branches of education should be taught, nor in any way to limit the use of money in promoting certain types of education, only I desire that it shall never be used to inculcate the doctrines of one religion sect one more than the other".

In September 1893, John's sister Elizabeth Erwin and his niece Ira John from Indiana challenged his will in a Multnomah County court on the grounds that he was not fit when the document was made out and signed. Edward A. Deadly and H. B. Nicholas came forward to say they had witnessed James John sign the will and that he was of sound body and mind when he did so. His land was valued at US$100,000. Plans to sell the property were halted by the courts during the preceding. Philip T. Smith, the executor of the estate, was allowed to start selling plots of land in 1897 through 1900.

Robert Catilin was appointed by the state circuit court to administrator the estate of James John in December 1901. The court allowed Catilin to start selling more land in June 1902. In 1903, the court cases were no longer pending so the funds in the estate could be used to build a new public school in St. Johns, per John's request. However in September 1907 the trustees announced the city did not own all the land that was left to the settlement and they had to turn it over with the exception of small plot where they eventually erected a high school.

==== Legacy ====
In November 1906, the newly built St. Johns–Linnton ferry was named the James John "in honor" of the founder of the settlement. The citizens of St. Johns held a "Pioneer Day" where it was announced a statue of James John would be raised in the town if they could fund the project. It was their intention to have the monument ready for next years festivities. John's vision of a public school building for St. Johns was realized in 1911 when James John High School opened on the plot that was not repossessed by John's trustees.

== Journal entries ==
The following are journal entries from James John as recorded in the St. Johns Review by Oregon Historical Society director George H. Heins in 1906.

1841

- May 17 & 18 — "Stayed the night about 11 miles from the Wakarootia [Wakarusa River] creek and crossed it at 12 o'clock on the 18^{th}. This night we encamped at the creek by the name above mentioned that we crossed yesterday. Here we met with some difficulty. One of our oxen strayed and we did not get them until 10 o'clock in the morning."
- May 19 — "This night we camped at a spring 20 miles from the Canzes [Kansas] River."
- May 20 — "This morning we set out for the crossing place. We had not gone far before we [met] two of the company coming back to meet us. They told us that the rest of the company had gone ahead. They helped us push on and we got to the river at three o'clock, and got all of our baggage and wagon animals etc., across the river at sunset. The Indians were very active in helping us across. They floated our baggage over in buffalo hides, swimming and pushing them before them."
- May 21, 22 & 23 — "This morning we set out to overtake the company. We had not gone far before five of the company came riding up and told us that the company was two days ahead of us. They stayed until we got up with them, which happened on the 23^{rd}. This day we met 14 Pawnee Indian warriors armed and equipped for battle. They shook hands with us and appeared to be friendly. One of the men gave them some tobacco which pleased them very much. We went on and encamped on a large creek called the Blue. There we overtook the company who were waiting there for us. Here we caught some fine fish, and stayed until morning."
- May 24 — "This day we arrived at another creek at one o'clock; it being very high, we were obliged to camp there until morning."
- May 25 — "We crossed the creek at seven o'clock this morning. Here we caught some fish and some of the company seen [sic] a gang of elk. We encamped this night on a small creek."
- May 26 — "We left here at seven o'clock. One of the wagons broke down. Today we seen [sic] about 30 Pawnee Indians today [sic]. They were very friendly and armed with bows, lances and guns, prepared to meet the Caws. One of the mule teams run [sic] away and broke the hounds of their wagon. This night we encamped at a small creek."
- May 27 — "Left here early this morning. The route is a little broken today and the heat oppressive. Camped this night at a handsome little creek about 15 miles from the place where we stayed last night."
- May 28 — "Set out this morning early. Stopped and took breakfast at a beautiful creek of pure water at nine o'clock. Left there at 10 o'clock and arrived at a creek called the Big Blue. There we encamped this day. One of the men killed one antelope. The heat was oppressive today. We have killed one antelope and a few deer and a few turkeys since we started for California and that is about all we have killed."
- May 29 — "Started early this morning. Killed two antelope. Encamped on the banks of the Blue this evening, for we are traveling on the banks of that stream. It rises eastward and we are going west. Encamped on the same stream this night."
- May 30 — "Left here this morning at eight o'clock. Killed one deer and antelope today. Stayed this night on the banks of the Blue."
- May 31 — "Started early this morning at seven o'clock. Met five wagons form Fort Laramer [Laramie] to Independence [Missouri]. They said it would be four days before we would get to any buffalo. They were loaded with plenty, buffalo hides etc. We traded with them for some buffalo meet and moccasins. We are about 400 miles west of Independence, traveling through sandy but fertile plains. We are still traveling on the Blue. Left the Blue this morning and encamped on the prairie."

- July 13 — "This morning we left the encampment and traveled over some rocky country. Killed one buffalo. We met two of our men about 10 o'clock that had been sent by the company on the 6^{th} of July to rendezvous on Green River to make some arrangements for [the] company in exchanging the oxteams for mules, etc.: but they found no person there, not even an Indian on the whole route. We have not seen an Indian, except two, that are with us, since we left Laramie fort. We encamped on the banks of the creek last mentioned."
- July 14 — "This day we lay here for the purpose of killing and laying in more meat. We had a hard frost here this morning. We have killed a fine chance at buffalo today. I do not know the number: perhaps about eight or nine."
- July 15 — "This day we moved about eight miles and camped until next day on Sweetwater creek. The nights are cool here and there is frost nearly every morning. There is no timber except a few willows along the creek. We are at this time about eight miles from what is called Wind river mountains. They are in sight of us and are covered with snow. We have seen them for the last 10 days. We leave them to the right hand."
- July 16 — "This day we moved about ten miles farther up the creek and encamped about noon for purpose of drying meat and getting good range for our cattle and horses. We killed a good number of fowl which they call sage cocks [centrocercus]. They are larger than a common domestic chicken."
- July 17 — "I caught some good fish at the camp. We left the camp at eight o'clock and moved about three miles farther up the creek. We have killed three buffalo bulls today and a number of sage chickens. Buffaloes are getting scarce here. Nothing but bulls. The is now cows [sic] here."
- July 18 — "We left Sweetwater creek this morning a six o'clock and traveled about 17 miles and encamped on one of the head branches of the Coloradoe [Colorado] of the west. We have killed two buffalo today and one antelope. The day was pleasant and we have had no rain since we left the north fork of the Platte River."
- July 19 — "This day we traveled about 15 miles and encamped on the bank of a creek called the Big Sandy. There is good grass and the wild unions [onions] grown nearly three feet high. We are still in sight of some mountains that we seen on the ninth day of this month and others are covered with snow."
- July 20 — "Today we traveled hard all day, and did not get more than seven or eight miles on a straight line. Killed no game today except one antelope. We encamped on the bank of Big Sandy this evening. The valley is still destitute of timber and almost everything else but sage. The valley is wider in some places than in others, varying from one to 60 miles in width."
- July 21 — "This morning was pleasant and we traveled all day on the basks of Big Sandy, the same creek we encamped on last evening and encamped on this evening."
- July 22 — "Today we traveled about 12 miles and encamped at noon on the bank of the Big Sandy. Here we stayed until the 23^{rd}. Today a man has returned to camp who was sent out on the 14^{th} to find some trader on the Coloradoe [Colorado] River in order to get information respecting the route to California and get a pilot. He brought about 60 men with him who came to trade with us. They informed us that it was impossible for wagons to get to California, but they could get down on the Columbia without much trouble."
- July 23 — "This day we traveled about 10 miles and arrived at Green or Coloradoe River, attended by the men that came to us yesterday and a number of Snake Indians. The river here is about 100 yards wide and has little timber on its banks, such as cottonwood and willow. Here we stayed until the 25^{th} and traded with the Indians and trappers for packhorses, robes, etc. There is frost here nearly every night, but the days are warm and pleasant. The plains around here are barren and destitute of timber."

1843

- July 1 — "Today we came about 12 miles through what is called the Quallatty [Tualatin] plains and we encamped on a small creek near W. D.'s [William Doughty's] plantation. The plains are beautiful for making farms. Nature has cleared them out and surrounded them with good water and timber. The land also appears to be good. The wheat crops are very good this season; the grass plenty and of an excellent quality."

1844

- July 2, 1843 to undated 1844 — "Today [July 2, 1843] I left the [Hudson's Bay] company. Stayed here until the 4^{th} and went to Vancouver [Washington] a distance of about 25 miles. Bough some clothing and returned to Mr. Doughty's where I remained until September and commenced a farm for myself and sold by improvements for $80 and made another one mile west of it in the plains. This I also sold in the year 1843, about the middle of December, for the sum of $1,200 and left here the first of the year 1844 and bought a townlot in Linnton and built a warehouse
