= Portland Public Schools (Oregon) =

School district in Portland, Oregon, United States

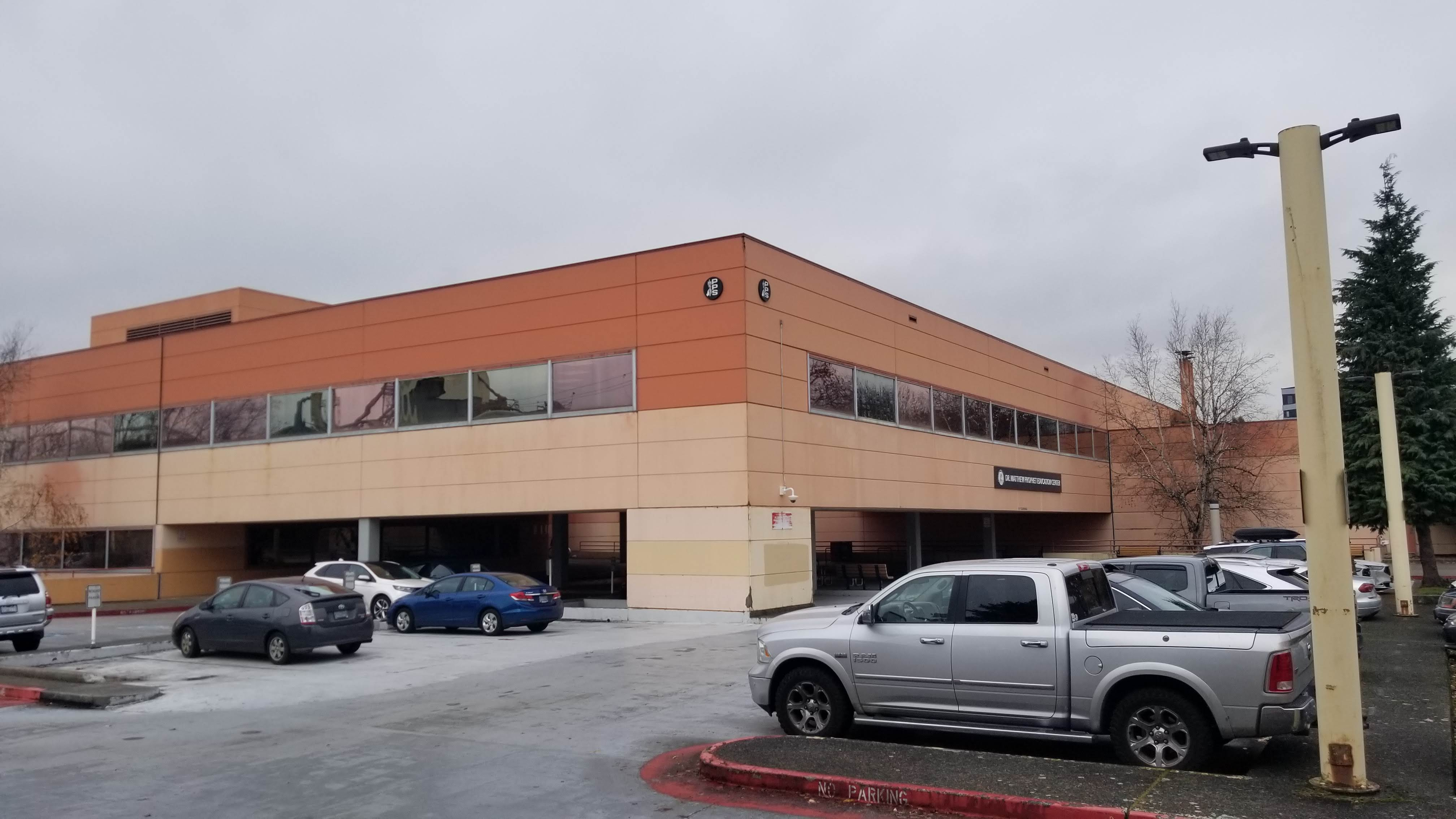
- Blanchard Educational Service Center, the school district's headquarters, in 2024

Location
- Portland, Oregon United States

District information
- Type: Public
- Grades: PK–12
- Established: 1851; 175 years ago
- Schools: 86
- Budget: $655 million (2018–19)

Students and staff
- Students: 44,771 (2023–2024)
- Teachers: 3,587
- Staff: 8,200

Other information
- Website: pps.net

Portland Public Schools (PPS; officially Portland School District 1J) is a public school district located in Portland, Oregon, United States. It is the largest school district in the state of Oregon. It is a PK–12 district with an enrollment of more than 49,000 students. It comprises more than 100 locations, including 79 schools and other sites that are maintained within the district.

== History ==
=== 19th century ===
In the 1850s, when the first public schools were formed in Portland, free education was a new concept. On December 6, 1851, the following advertisement appeared in The Oregonian:

In pursuance of a vote of the Portland school district at their annual meeting, the directors have established a free school. The first term will commence on Monday, the 15th inst., at the schoolhouse in this city, near the City Hotel. (John W. [sic] Outhouse, teacher.) The directors would recommend the following books to be used in the school, viz.: Sandler's Series of Readers and Spellers, Goodrich's Geography, Thompson's Arithmetics and Bullion's Grammar.

John Outhouse served as the schoolteacher, and was paid 100 dollars a month. The school was held in a school house at the corner of First and Oak Streets, in what is now Northwest Portland, and had just 20 students at first.

The early public schools were met with some criticism. An editorial in The Oregonian on July 3, 1852 stated that the Common School Council was "self-called, self-elected, that voted a thousand dollars in addition to be paid by our citizens for pedagoguing some dozen or two of children."

Abigail Clarke was hired at the beginning of the third term in 1852, due to increased attendance and a $1600 tax to pay for the schools. She was paid 75 dollars a month, and taught at a new school building, on First and Taylor Streets. By the third term, 126 students were enrolled in all, and an average of 90 showed up each day. Clarke was known to "thrash" boys who made a sport of rapping on the windows of the school, which faced out to the street. She continued to teach until the summer of 1853, when she moved to Oregon City.

In December 1854, Thomas Frazer wrote a notice in The Oregonian to try to create a school board for Portland. Many responded, and the first school board consisted of Frazer himself, William S. Ladd, and Shubrick Norris as directors. The first superintendent of Multnomah County was L. Limerick, who was appointed in January 1855.

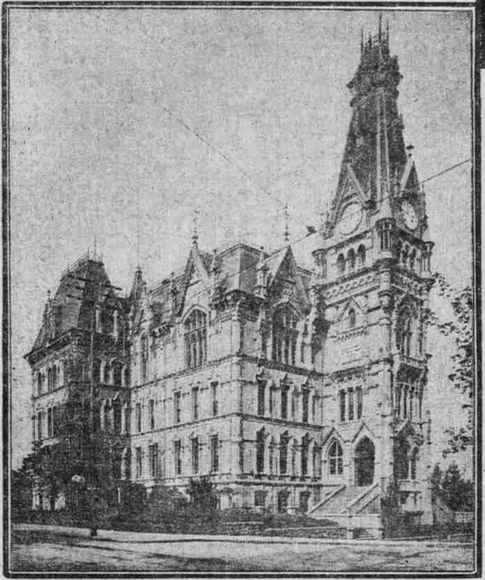
West Side High School, later Lincoln High School

On December 18, 1854, the school board organized two school districts, named School District Number 1 and School District Number 2, divided by Morrison Street. On March 31, 1856, they were merged into a single School District Number 1.

School District Number 1 opened a school in fall 1855, presumably replacing the school started by Outhouse and Clarke. This school was presided over by Sylvester Pennoyer and closed in six months, as the funds were exhausted. In 1858, a new schoolhouse was built, financed by canceling school for a year. The school was located at Sixth and Morrison and named the Central School. The Central School location was later occupied by the Portland Hotel and is now Pioneer Courthouse Square. A high school, Portland High School (now Lincoln High School), was opened in 1869, and a night school program was created at the high school in 1889.

In the 1860s, the school budget was very low, about $10 per student per year. William S. Ladd, known for being thrifty, raised objections to the school paying for supplies such as ink, requiring students to instead make their own by boiling oak bark and carrying it in animal horns.

In 1867, shoemaker William Brown, one of approximately 200 black people then living in Portland, sued the school district for refusing to educate the 16 black children in the city. The Colored School opened in fall 1867, discontinuing in 1872 when a local referendum supported integration. By December 1873, 30 students (out of 1048) in the district were black.

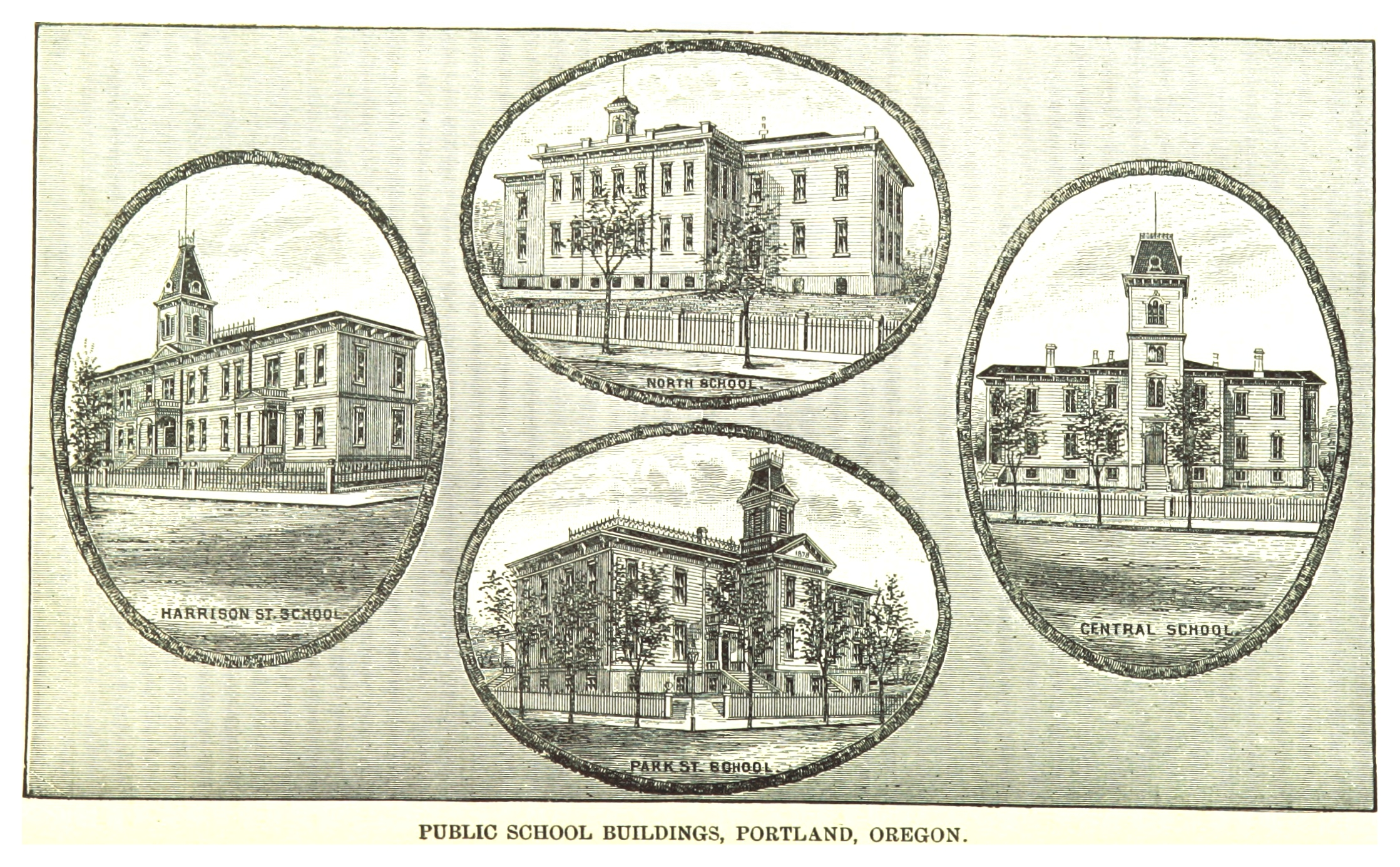
Portland school buildings in 1882

By the end of the 1870s, there were four elementary schools: Central School (1858–?), Harrison School (1866–?), Colored School (1867–1872), and North School (1868–?).

Portland schools were questioned by Harvey W. Scott and The Oregonian in 1880, especially regarding the efficacy and practicality of public high schools. The yearly cost to educate a student in 1879 in Portland was $24.06. A compulsory education program was enacted in Oregon on February 25, 1889. By 1891, the district contained 95 teachers, seven elementary schools, one high school, and one night school. The schools were described as crowded by The Oregonian at that time. Other school districts in East Portland and Albina were combined in 1891 (with 83% of residents voting in favor of consolidation). This added nine elementary schools, 74 teachers, and 2698 students to the system.

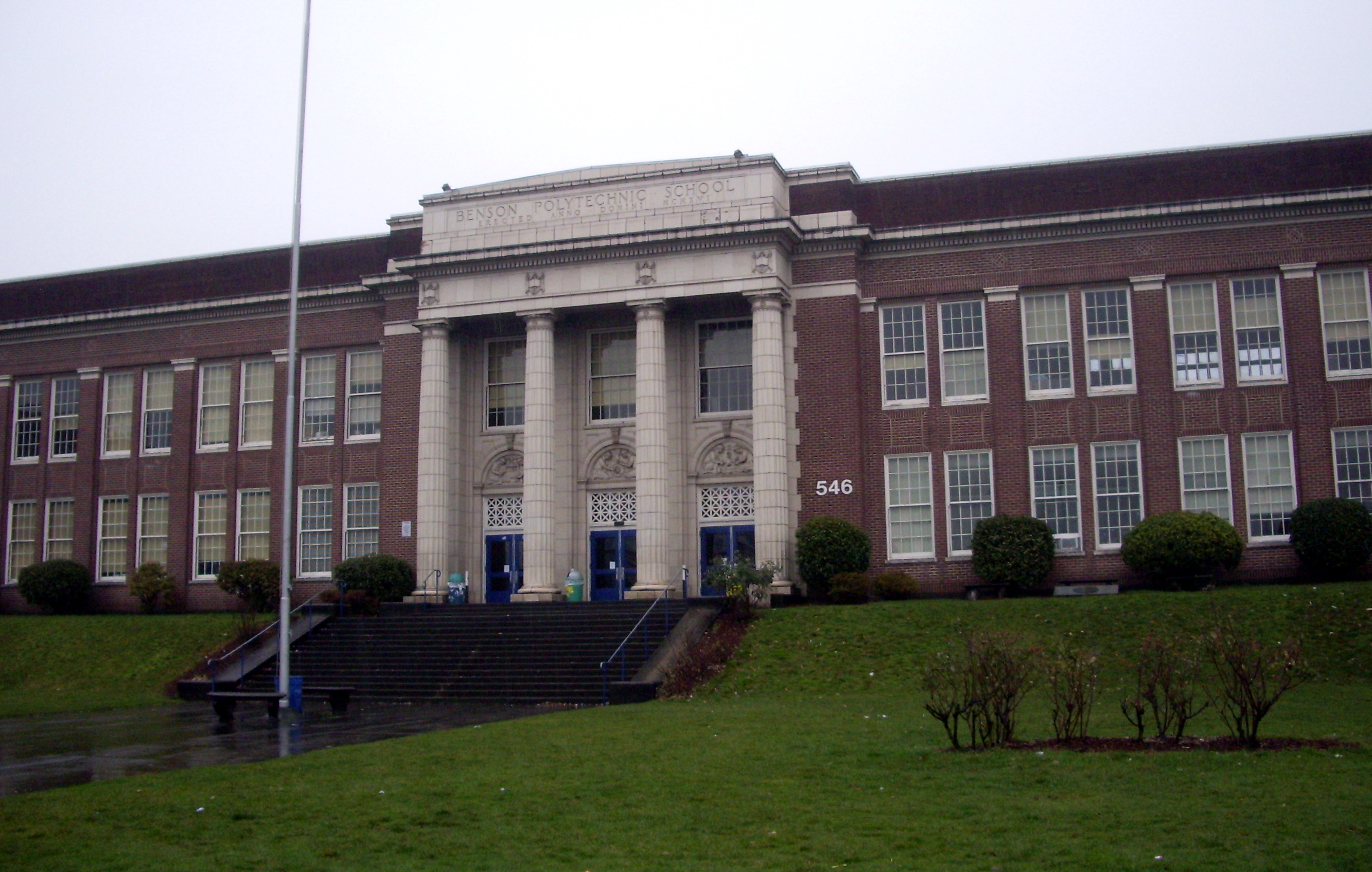
Benson Polytechnic High School was founded in 1908.

=== 20th century ===
The St. Johns (school) District was annexed on July 7, 1915, and the James John High School was added at this time. On the suggestion of superintendent Lewis H. Alderman, high school dances were allowed by the school board beginning in 1915, with the stipulation that "the parents of a majority of the students attend." Portable classrooms were used, especially in 1919, with 60 portables added. By this time, there were evening schools taught at Benson High School, Girls' Polytechnic (later merged with Benson), Commerce, Jefferson High School, Ladd, and Lincoln High School. A new administration building opened at NE 7th Ave and NE Clackamas St in the Lloyd District.

On June 21, 1924, a $5 million bond was passed to build and remodel schools over the next five years, part of a planned three-part construction program expected to last 15 years and cost $15 million. Four new schools were planned during the first five years. By 1927, there were 43,419 elementary students served.

In 1930, the Great Depression caused a decrease in the number of elementary students enrolled, but an increase in both men and women in the high schools. The 1931 annual report stated: "At no previous time has the question of clothing, books, and carfare been so serious. Realizing that idleness is perhaps the greatest contributing factor toward delinquency, we hope to double our efforts this fall in the attempt to keep every child in school who should be there." Teacher salaries, school year length, and other cost-cutting measures were made in 1932–1933.

A new superintendent, Ralph E. Dugdale, began on August 26, 1937. He strongly believed "the schools of Portland were training people for jobs that did not exist," and began making aggressive curriculum and organizational changes. Twelve committees (with 169 faculty) over elementary education were created, and monthly report cards were canceled (in 1950, this was described as a "nationwide trend of discarding the antiquated method of sending monthly reports on student grades to parents."). Instead, occasional and irregular reports on academics and citizenship were sent home. Examinations on general knowledge and knowledge of educational development were instituted for new instructors. High school students were required to pass a minimum number of credits per semester, and then were evaluated to see if an alternative school would work better.

The district trained a large number of defense workers in the national defense program, in preparation for World War II. About 10,000 men were trained in 1941 in airplane construction, shipbuilding, and other fields. During September 1942, 4400 additional elementary students enrolled. Ten teachers were added. There was an increased number of freshmen and sophomores in the high schools, but an overall loss of 832 students due to war industries and enlistment. By 1942, there were 63,238 school-age students, with 54,655 registered, and 1,613 instructors in 76 buildings.

In 1945, Dr. Willard B. Spalding, superintendent since 1943, issued a 120-page report titled "Modernizing the School Plant", calling for a $25 million building program and projecting major changes in store. Fighting with Governor Earl Snell for a special legislative session, high school students struck for a day. In August 1946, 50 kindergartens were closed due to lack of funds and instructors. Other large cost-cutting measures were taken, including discussion of closing high school sports programs. Spalding and his assistant superintendent went on recruiting trips in the south and east states. Spalding resigned on June 30, 1947 to become the dean of the College of Education at the University of Illinois.

Dr. Paul A. Rehmus was the next superintendent, notable for having the highest annual salary of any superintendent in the history of Portland Public Schools to this time- $13,000. Rehmus rejected progressive education, stating "The term 'progressive education' as a definite school of teaching method does not exist. The demarcation between what is formal and what is progressive education is almost impossible to define." In 1947, a $25 million levy was approved by voters, as well as $1.7 million to balance the operational budget.

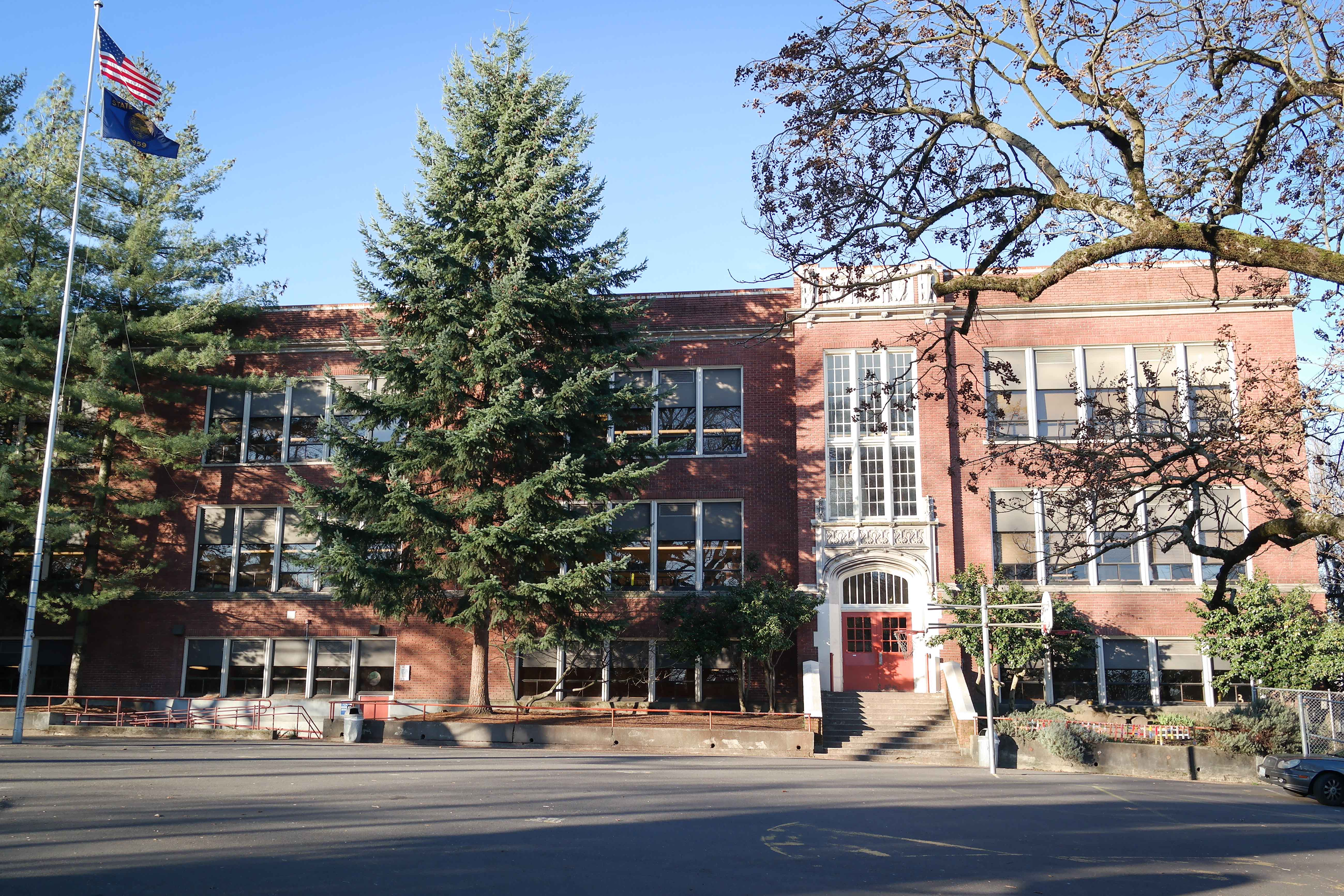
Metropolitan Learning Center, a K–12 alternative program run by PPS, was founded in 1968.

On June 30, 1949, there were 73,972 school-age students in the district boundaries, with 49,825 registered for school. The district had 1,828 teachers and 76 buildings.

In October 1949 a "secret society problem" developed where three high school fraternities were involved in the "manhandling of a girl student." 50 boys had taken part in the incident, part of an initiation. An emergency school board meeting led to the banning of secret societies in the district. Parents and adult members of these secret societies filed a lawsuit in 1950.

Three high schools were voted to close in 1981: Jackson High School in southwest Portland, Adams High School in northeast Portland, and Washington-Monroe High School in the inner eastside. The Adams and Jackson closures were done after a 3:30am vote of school board members, and a board member had to be followed home by a police escort. The closures were done due to low enrollment and to balance the budget, but the community and a board member threatened lawsuits.

Enrollment in PPS continued to decline until 2010 and now slow growth is projected. Faced with some very small schools (200–350 students) the district has undertaken what is intended to be a continual process of Enrollment Balancing to deal with anemic programs in some schools and overcrowded buildings in others.

=== 21st century ===
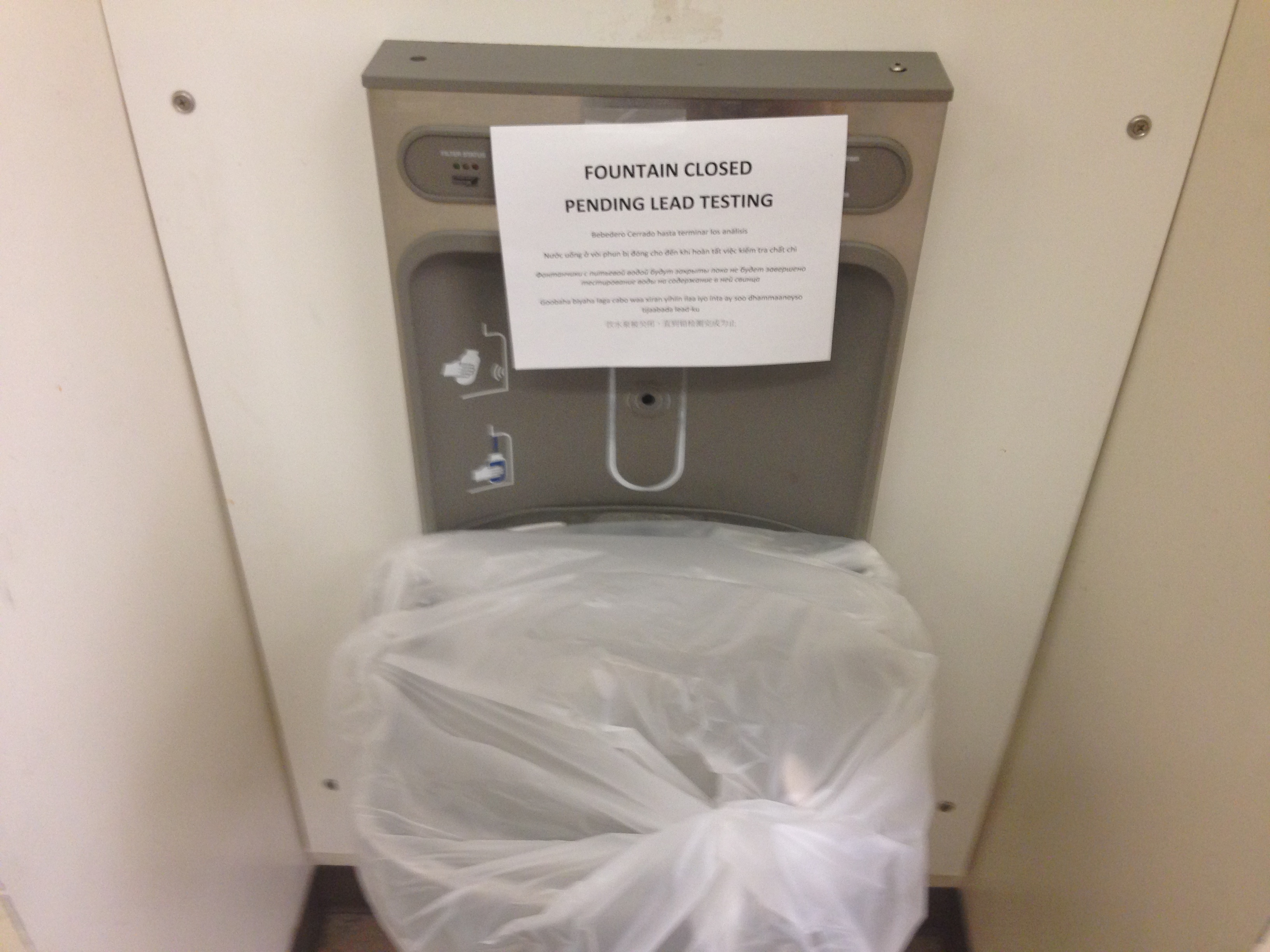
Water fountain at Jefferson High School with sign saying it is closed for lead testing

Since 2000, there have been concerns about lead and radon in Portland Public School buildings. In 2016, an overly large amount of lead was found in two schools. All PPS schools were ordered to use bottled water for the rest of the year instead of drinking from water fountains, and to use bottled water for food preparation and dish washing as well. Controversy surrounding poorly and infrequently tested water for lead led to Superintendent Carole Smith stepping down in July 2016, a year before her ten-year term ended. In August 2017, Guadalupe Guerrero became the new Superintendent.

Voters approved a $482 million bond measure in November 2012 to upgrade several schools, including Grant High School, Franklin High School, and Roosevelt High School. In May 2017, an additional $790 million bond measure was passed to reopen Kellogg Middle School and modernize three other schools: Madison High School, Benson Polytechnic High School, and Lincoln High School.

In 2020, the district ended the regular use of school resource officers and Guerrero announced plans to re-examine how the school district is partnered with the Portland Police Bureau.

On November 1, 2023, the Portland Association of Teachers went on strike, the first teacher strike in the district's history. The strike lasted for several weeks, ending in December. Due to the amount of days lost, Winter Break was only a week long that year, as opposed to the regular two.

In December 2025, the Portland Public Schools Board approved a five-year, $61.5 million contract with Texas-based firm Procedeo to manage projects financed by the district's $1.83 billion school bond. In September 2026, the Oregon Secretary of State referred an investigation into PPS's dealings with Procedeo to the Oregon Department of Justice for possible criminal investigation and to the Oregon Government Ethics Commission over potential ethics violations. An external audit released in October identified risks of favoritism in Procedeo's selection, excessive contract costs, and inadequate oversight resulting from reductions in district bond-management staff. PPS disputed several of the findings and declined to renegotiate the contract as recommended by auditors.

Meanwhile, PPS announced a districtwide "rightsizing" initiative in response to declining enrollment and financial pressures. In October 2026, the district proposed closing either 11 or 14 schools, redrawing attendance boundaries, and reorganizing educational programs beginning in fall 2027. The proposals prompted protests involving hundreds of parents, students, and educators, with critics questioning the district's decision-making process and lack of transparency. A parent advocacy group also raised concerns about the proposed closure of schools previously promised seismic upgrades under the 2025 bond, requesting an explanation of how the funding would be reallocated. On October 30, all 12 members of the Portland City Council urged PPS to reconsider its closure timeline and provide greater transparency and opportunities for public participation. In November, the district projected a $65 million deficit for the following school year and warned that up to 450 positions could be eliminated.

In November 2026, Willamette Week reported that senior PPS officials, including Superintendent Kimberlee Armstrong, had used the encrypted messaging app Signal to discuss district business, with disappearing messages enabled in some conversations. The reporting followed photographs taken during an October 20 school board meeting showing PPS Chief of Staff Deborah Kafoury allegedly exchanging Signal messages with an employee of Procedeo, whose contract with PPS had been referred for criminal investigation. In the exchange, Kafoury referred to a school board member as an "asshole," for which she subsequently apologized. A PPS spokesperson stated that Signal was not an approved platform for official district communications and that the district was investigating whether the messages constituted public records and could be recovered.

== Demographics ==
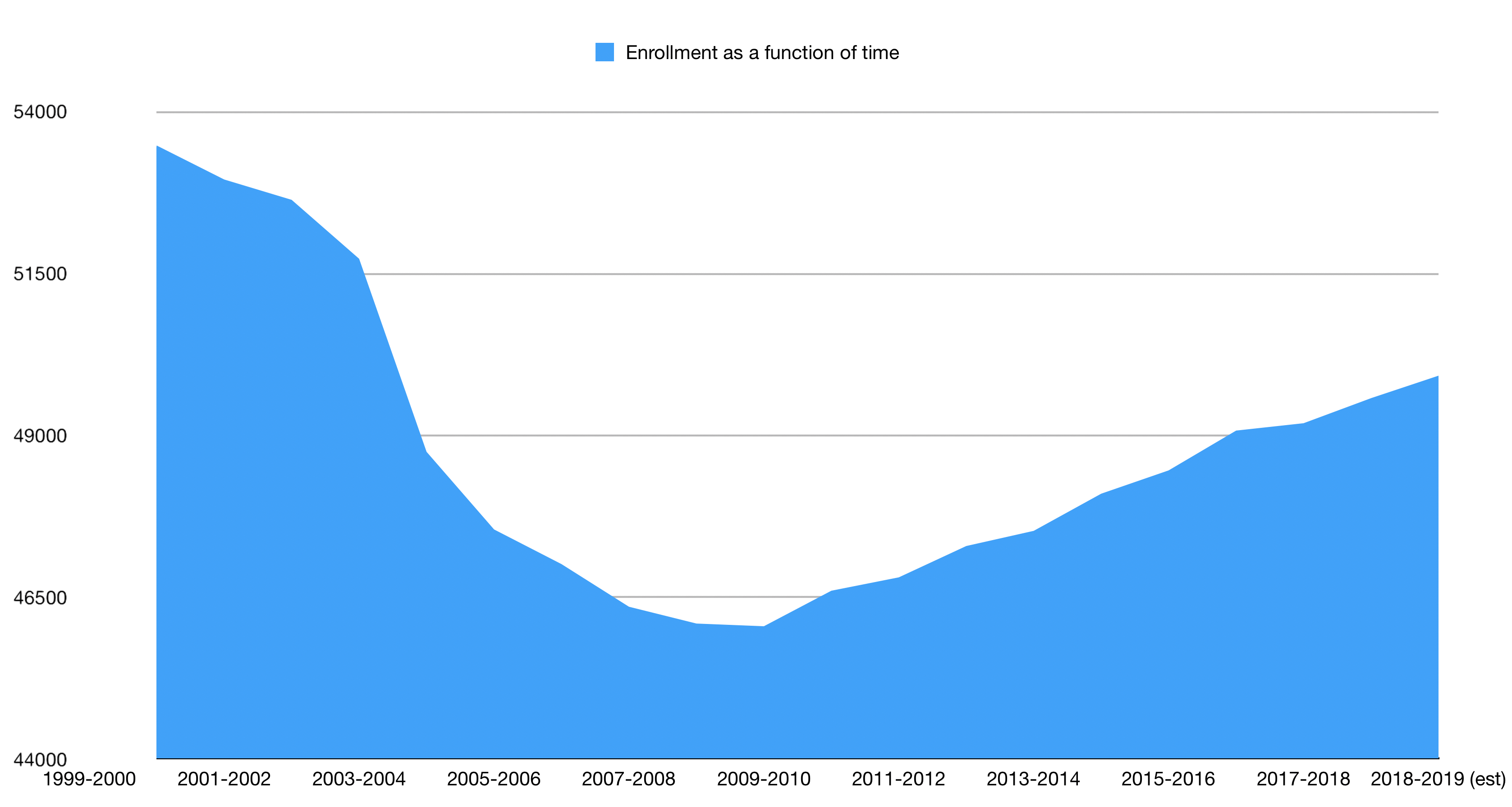
Enrollment data for Portland Public Schools from 1999 to 2019

In the 2009–2010 school year, PPS enrolled 81.6% of the city's available school-age children. Nonetheless, total school enrollment was declining, accompanying a change in Portland's demographics. As a result, the Portland Public Schools are facing increasing budget pressure.

In the 2009 school year, the district had 1706 students classified as homeless by the Department of Education, or 3.8% of students in the district.

== Boundary ==
The district, mostly in Multnomah County, includes the majority of Portland as well as small portions of Lake Oswego, and a small section of the census-designated place of West Haven-Sylvan.

The district extends into Washington County, where it includes sections of Portland, a portion of Beaverton, and sections of the census-designated places of Cedar Mill, Raleigh Hills, West Haven-Sylvan, and West Slope.

It also extends into Clackamas County, where it extends into small sections of Lake Oswego.

== List of schools ==
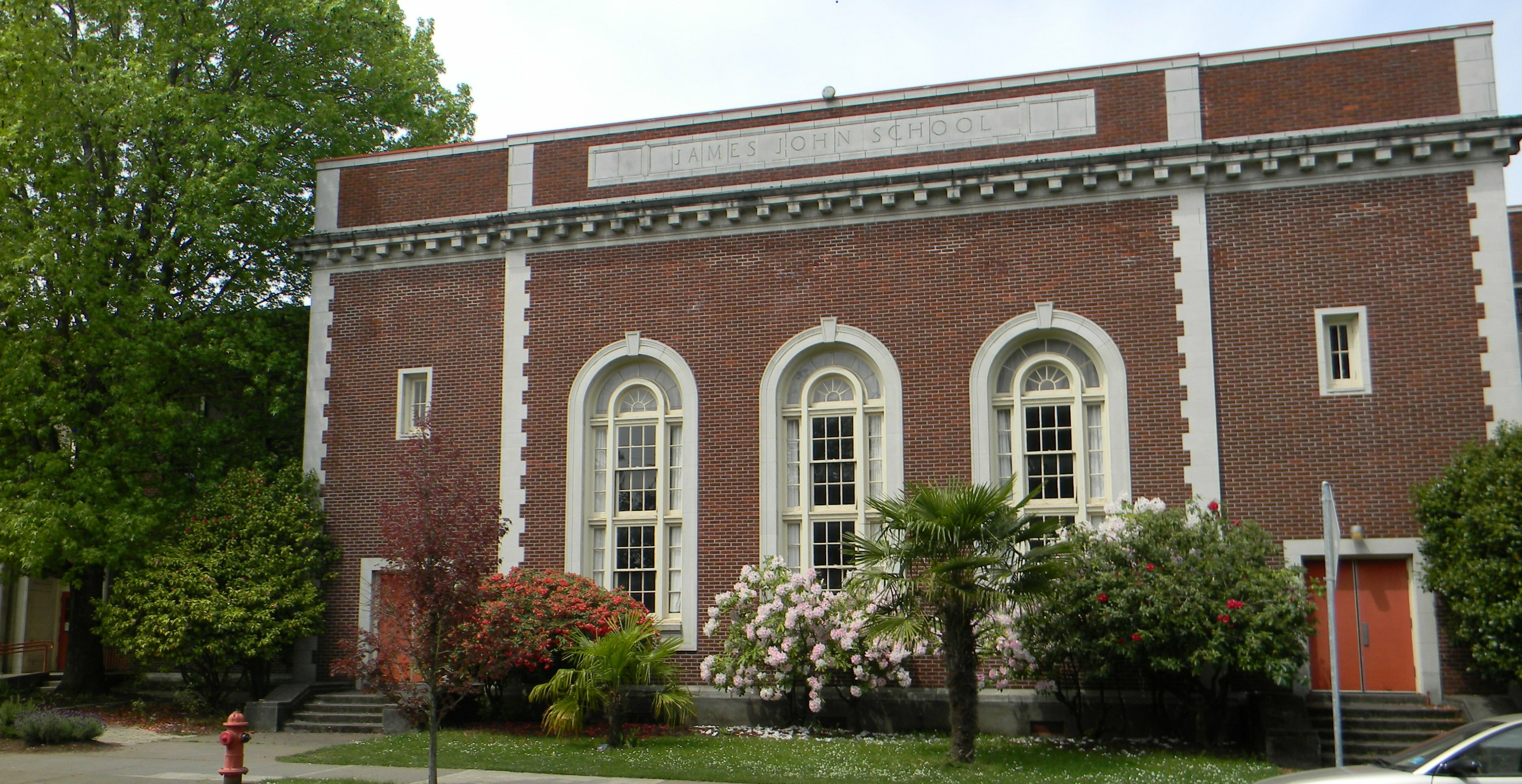
James John Elementary School in St. Johns

=== Elementary schools (K–5) ===
- Abernethy
- Ainsworth
- Alameda
- Atkinson
- Arleta
- Beach
- Boise-Eliot/Humboldt (Note: School includes a Pre-K program.)
- Bridlemile
- Buckman
- Capitol Hill
- Chapman
- Chief Joseph
- Clark
- Creston
- Duniway
- Forest Park
- Glencoe
- Grout
- Hayhurst
- Irvington
- James John
- Sunrise
- Kelly
- Lewis
- Llewellyn
- Lent – Spanish/English dual language
- Maplewood
- Markham
- Marysville
- Martin Luther King Jr.
- Peninsula
- Rieke
- Richmond – Japanese/English dual language
- Rigler – Spanish/English dual language
- Rosa Parks
- Rose City Park - Vietnamese/English dual language
- Sabin
- Scott
- Sitton
- Stephenson
- Vestal
- Whitman
- Woodlawn
- Woodmere
- Woodstock

=== Mixed grade ===
Grade ranges of schools listed below are K–8 unless noted

- ACCESS Academy, 2–8
- Astor School
- Beverly Cleary School
- Bridger–Creative Science School
- Cesar Chavez (formerly Clarendon-Portsmouth)
- Faubion School
- Laurelhurst School
- Metropolitan Learning Center, K–12
- Odyssey Program at East Sylvan
- Skyline School
- Sunnyside Environmental School
- Vernon School
- Winterhaven School
- Pioneer at Holladay K-6
- Pioneer at Youngson 7-12

=== Middle schools (6–8) ===
- Beaumont
- Brentwood
- da Vinci Arts Middle School
- George
- Harriet Tubman
- Harrison Park
- Hosford
- Jackson
- Kellogg
- Mt. Tabor
- Ockley Green
- Robert Gray
- Roseway Heights
- Sellwood
- West Sylvan

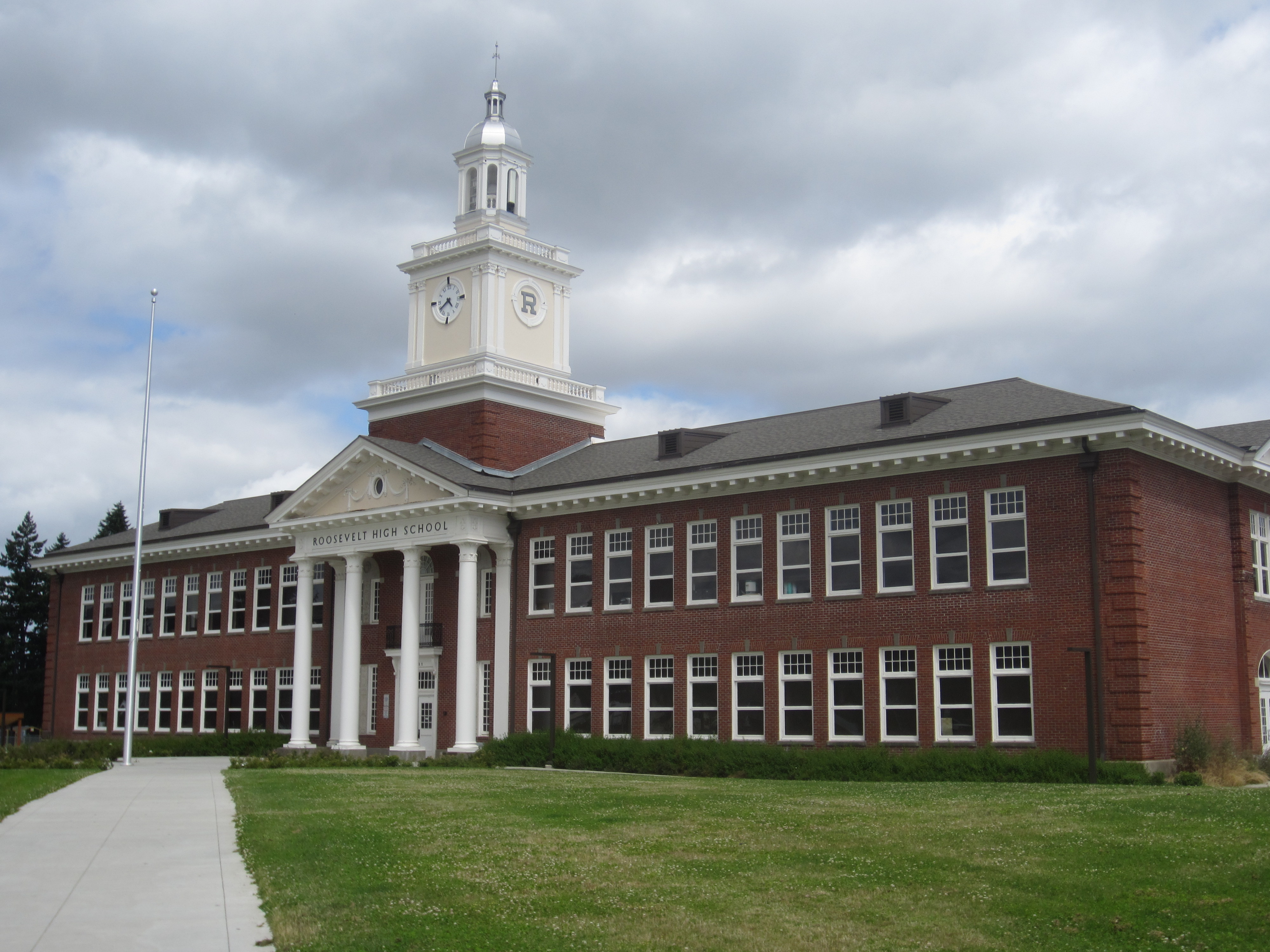
Roosevelt High School in North Portland

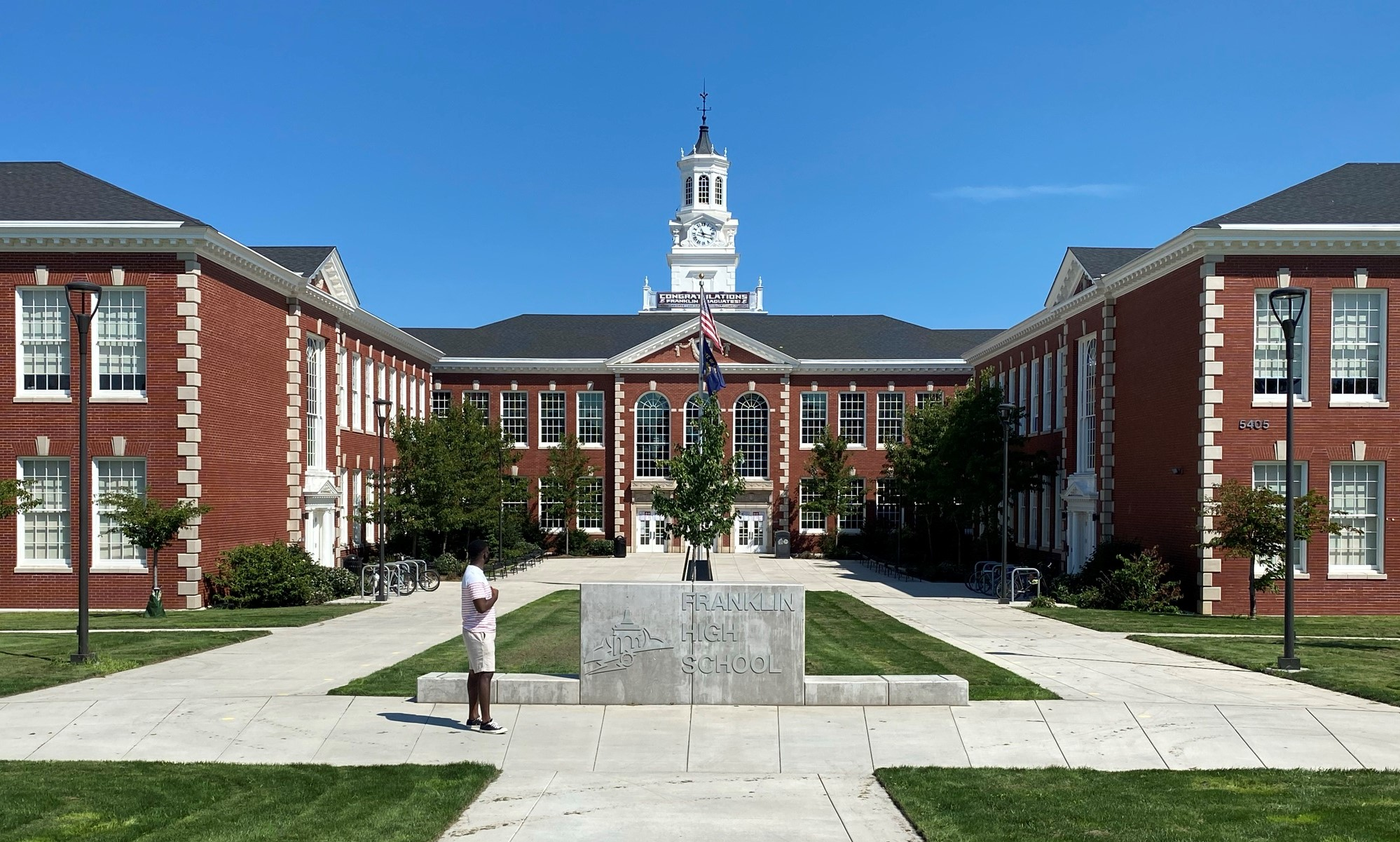
Franklin High School in Southeast Portland near Mount Tabor

=== High schools (9–12) ===
- Alliance High School (alternative school)
- Benson Polytechnic High School
- Cleveland High School
- Franklin High School
- Grant High School
- Ida B. Wells High School
- Jefferson High School
- Leodis V. McDaniel High School
- Lincoln High School
- Roosevelt High School

=== Dual Language Immersion Schools (DLI) ===
==== High Schools ====
- Cleveland High School – Chinese
- Franklin High School – Spanish, Russian
- Grant High School – Japanese
- Jefferson High School – Chinese
- Lincoln High School – Spanish
- McDaniel High School – Spanish, Vietnamese
- Roosevelt High School – Spanish

==== Middle Schools ====
- Beaumont Middle School – Spanish
- Brentwood Middle School – Russian
- George Middle School – Spanish
- Harriet Tubman Middle School – Chinese
- Harrison Park Middle School – Chinese
- Kellogg Middle School – Spanish
- Mount Tabor Middle School – Japanese
- Ockley Green Middle School – Spanish
- Roseway Heights Middle School – Spanish, Vietnamese
- West Sylvan Middle School – Spanish

==== Elementary Schools and K–8 Schools ====
- Ainsworth Elementary School – Spanish
- Atkinson Elementary School – Spanish
- Beach Elementary School – Spanish
- Cesar Chavez School – Spanish
- Clark Elementary School – Chinese
- James John Elementary School – Spanish
- Kelly Elementary School – Russian
- Lent Elementary School – Spanish–full-school program, students wanting an English-only program sent to Marysville Elementary
- Martin Luther King Jr. Elementary School – Chinese
- Richmond Elementary School – Japanese
- Rigler Elementary School – Spanish–full-school program, students wanting an English-only program sent to Scott Elementary
- Rose City Park Elementary School – Vietnamese
- Scott Elementary School – Spanish
- Sitton Elementary School – Spanish
- Woodstock Elementary School – Chinese

=== Closed Schools ===
- James John High School (closed 1921)
- Columbia Elementary School (closed 1975)
- Terwilliger School (closed 1975)
- Monroe High School (closed 1978)
- John Adams High School (closed 1981)
- Jackson High School (closed 1981)
- Washington-Monroe High School (closed 1981)
- Foster Elementary School (closed 1981)
- Rice School (closed 1997)
- Whitaker Adams Middle School (closed 2001)
- Youngson Elementary School (closed 2001)
- Wilcox School (closed 2002)
- Brooklyn Elementary School (closed 2003, now Winterhaven School)
- Meek Elementary School (closed 2003)
- Applegate Elementary School (closed 2004, now early learning center)
- Edwards Elementary School (closed 2005)
- Kenton Elementary School (closed 2005)
- Smith Elementary School (closed 2005)
- Clarendon Elementary School (closed 2007, now early learning center)
- Fernwood Middle School (closed 2007)
- Portsmouth Middle School (closed 2007, became Cesar Chavez School)
- Kellogg Middle School (closed 2007, reopened 2021)
- Harriet Tubman Middle School (closed 2007, reopened 2018)
- Binnsmead Middle School (closed 2008, became Harrison Park School)
- Marshall High School (closed 2011)
- Humboldt Elementary School (closed 2012)
- Harrison Park School (closed 2023, converted to middle school)
- Alliance High School at Meek and Kenton (closed in 2024 to consolidate and be at one building)

== Leadership ==
=== Superintendent ===
Kimberlee Armstrong, PhD

=== School Board ===
As of 2024, the school board consists of:

- Andrew Scott (Zone #1)
- Michelle DePass (Zone #2), Vice Chair
- Patte Sullivan (Zone #3)
- Herman Greene (Zone #4)
- Gary Hollands (Zone #5)
- Julia Brim-Edwards (Zone #6)
- Edward (Eddie) Wang (Zone #7), Chair

== See also ==
- David Douglas School District, serving part of eastern Portland
- List of school districts in Oregon
- Multnomah Education Service District
- Title 20 of the United States Code
