= Education in Portland, Oregon =

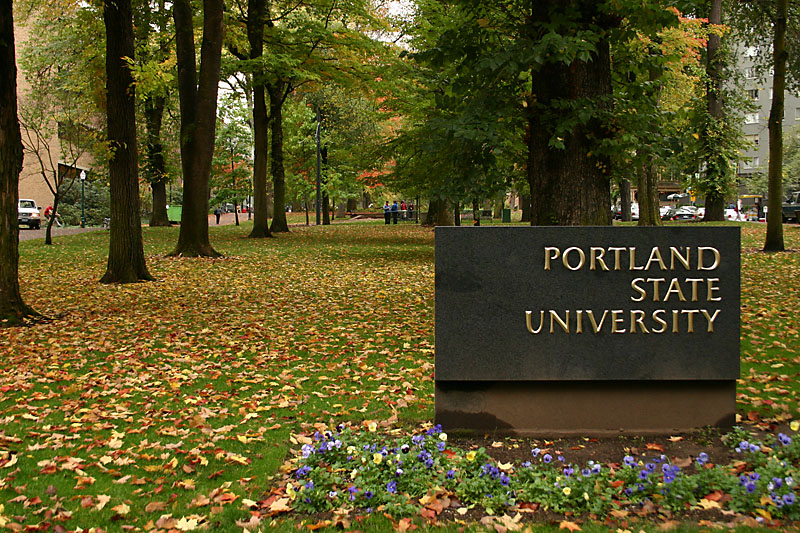
Portland State University

Portland, Oregon contains six public school districts, many private schools, as well as public and private colleges and universities including Portland State University.

== Public elementary and secondary education ==
District	Enrollment
Portland Schools	49,189
Reynolds School District	10,700
David Douglas School District	9,500
Centennial School District	6,700
Parkrose School District	3,700
Riverdale	220
Beaverton	40,725

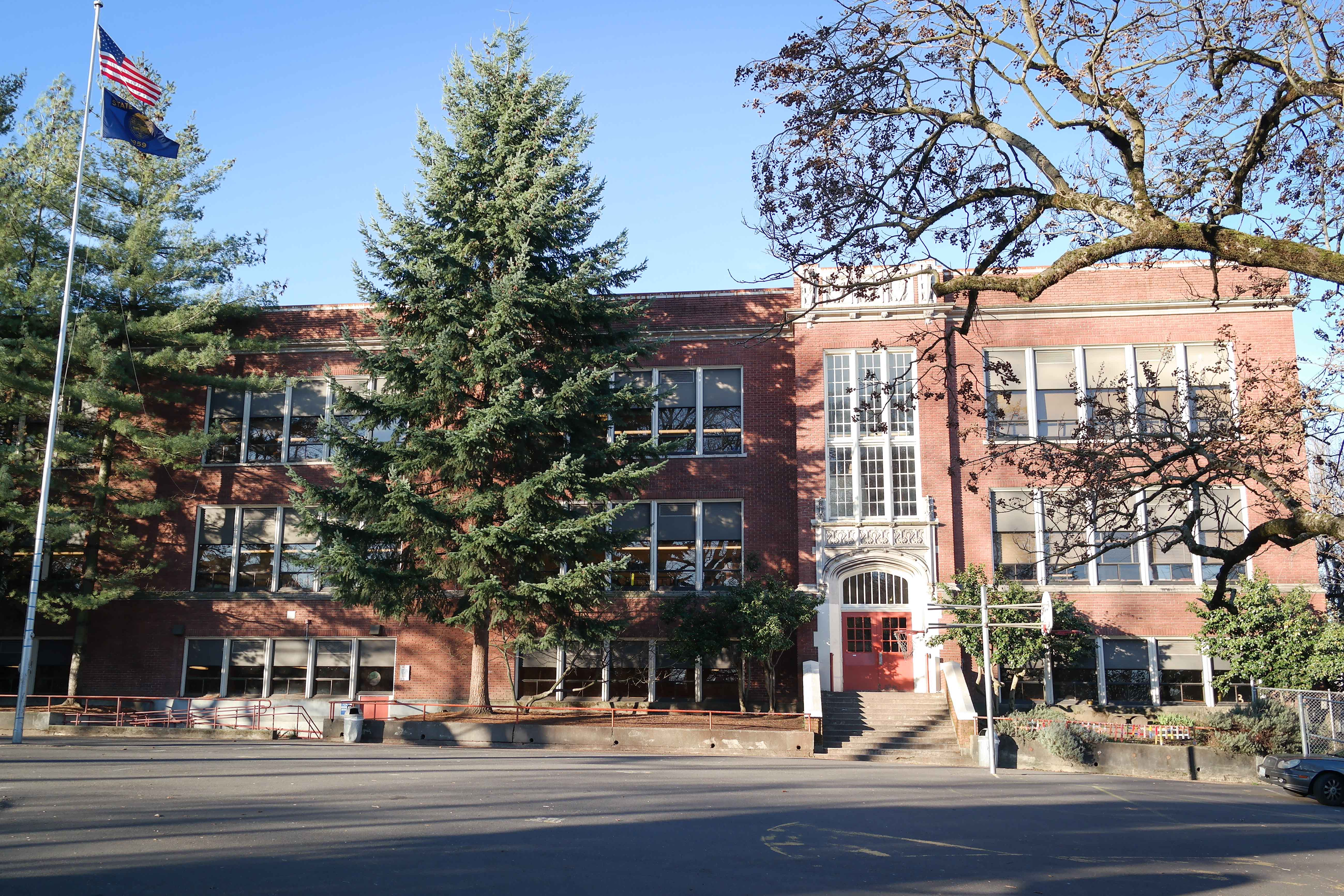
Metropolitan Learning Center, a public Kx12 school in Northwest Portland

The largest school district covering portions of the city limits, Portland Public School District, consists of about 100 schools covering, in various combinations, grades kindergarten through 12, as well as 50 special education programs. The number of students in the school district is approximately 53,000 — an enrollment of over 90% of the available school-age children, a higher percentage than other large urban school districts. Some of the elementary schools include; Abernethy, Scott, Bridlemile, and Peninsula. Some of the K8 schools are Martin Luther King Jr., Beverly Cleary, Bridger, and Hayhurst. Some of the middle schools are Jackson, George, and Mt. Tabor.

In addition to PPS, other school districts in Multnomah County that serve parts of the city include the Beaverton School District, Centennial School District, David Douglas School District, Parkrose School District, Reynolds School District, Riverdale School District, and Scappoose School District. Portions in Clackamas County are in the North Clackamas School District and Centennial School District. Portions in Washington County are in Portland Public Schools.

Parkrose and David Douglas school districts are also fully contained within the city. The Parkrose District has a single high school, a middle school and four elementary schools. Beaverton, Tigrad-Tualatin, Centennial, and Reynolds all primarily consist of suburb residents, but absorb suburban Portland and/or CDP residents.

=== Portland high schools ===
School name	District	Established	Enrollment	Notable alumni
Beaverton High School	Beaverton	1910	1,473	Shoshana Bean.
Benson Polytechnic High School	Portland Public			A.C. Green
Cleveland High School	Portland Public			Phil Knight
David Douglas High School	David Douglas			
Franklin High School	Portland Public			
Grant High School	Portland Public			Terrell Brandon, Sally Struthers, Beverly Cleary, Thomas M. Lauderdale
Ida B. Wells-Barnett High School (formerly Woodrow Wilson)	Portland Public	1956	1,413	Damon Stoudamire, Wayne Twitchell, Dale Murphy
Jefferson High School	Portland Public			Terry Baker, Aaron Miles
Lake Oswego High School	Lake Oswego			Kevin Love
Lincoln High School	Portland Public			Mel Blanc, Elliott Smith, Matt Groening, Peter Jacobsen, S. David Griggs
Madison High School	Portland Public			
Marshall High School	Portland Public			
Metropolitan Learning Center	Portland Public	1968		Max Records, Rebecca Skloot, Tanya Barfield
Mount Scott Alternative High School	Portland Public			
Parkrose High School	Parkrose			Michael Allen Harrison, Susan J. Helms
Roosevelt High School	Portland Public			
Metropolitan Learning Center	Portland Public			
Riverdale	Riverdale	1888	220	
Sunset High School	Beaverton			
Tigard High School	Tigard-Tualatin			
Westview High School	Beaverton			

== Private primary and secondary education ==
The region also has a number of private schools, including: Catlin Gabel School, Central Catholic High School, Jesuit High School, De La Salle North Catholic High School, Franciscan Montessori Earth School & Saint Francis Academy, French American International School, The International School, The Northwest Academy, Oregon Episcopal School, St. Mary's Academy, Tucker Maxon School, Trinity Academy, Trinity Lutheran Church and School, Portland Waldorf School, Portland Jewish Academy, Village Free School, Holy Family Catholic School, Columbia Christian Schools, Portland Christian Schools, Pacific Crest Community School, Village Home Education Resource Center and Choices Independent Learning, Summa Academy and Portland Adventist Academy.

== Colleges and universities ==
=== Public colleges and universities ===
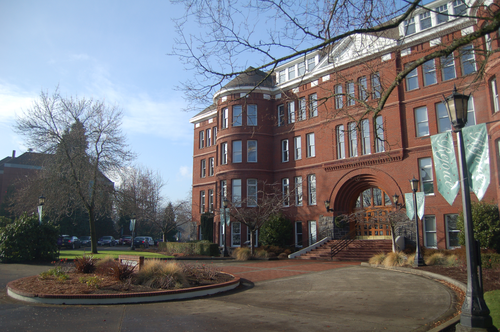
Waldschmidt Hall at the University of Portland.

Portland State University, with graduate and undergraduate enrollment of over 26,000, is Oregon's largest university. Its primary campus is at the southern edge of downtown.

Oregon Health and Science University (OHSU) began as the University of Oregon Medical School in 1913. In addition to its medical, nursing, and dental divisions (see below), it merged with the Oregon Graduate Institute of Science and Technology in 2001, taking on its current name and composition.

Portland Community College has two major campuses in the city—Cascade and Sylvania—as well as the smaller Southeast Center and Metropolitan Workforce Training Center. The third large campus—Rock Creek—is located outside of the city in unincorporated Washington County.

=== Private colleges and universities ===
Institution	Type	Founded	President	Enrollment
Cascade College	Christian	1993	Dr. William Goad	closed
Concordia University	Lutheran	1905	Dr. Charles Schlimpert	closed
Lewis & Clark College	Private	1867	Dr. Barry Glassner	3713
Linfield University (Portland Campus)	Private	1858	Dr. Thomas L. Hellie	350
Multnomah University	Christian	1936	Dr. Daniel R. Lockwood	closed
Pacific Northwest College of Art	Private	1910	Thomas Manley	550
University of Portland	Catholic	1901	Rev. Mark Leon Poorman	3911
Reed College	Private	1908	Audrey Bilger	1464
Warner Pacific University	Christian	1937	Dr. Andrea Cook	644
Total				10,632

Portland Bible College, Walla Walla University (School of Nursing), and Western Seminary are also located in the city.

=== Medical schools ===
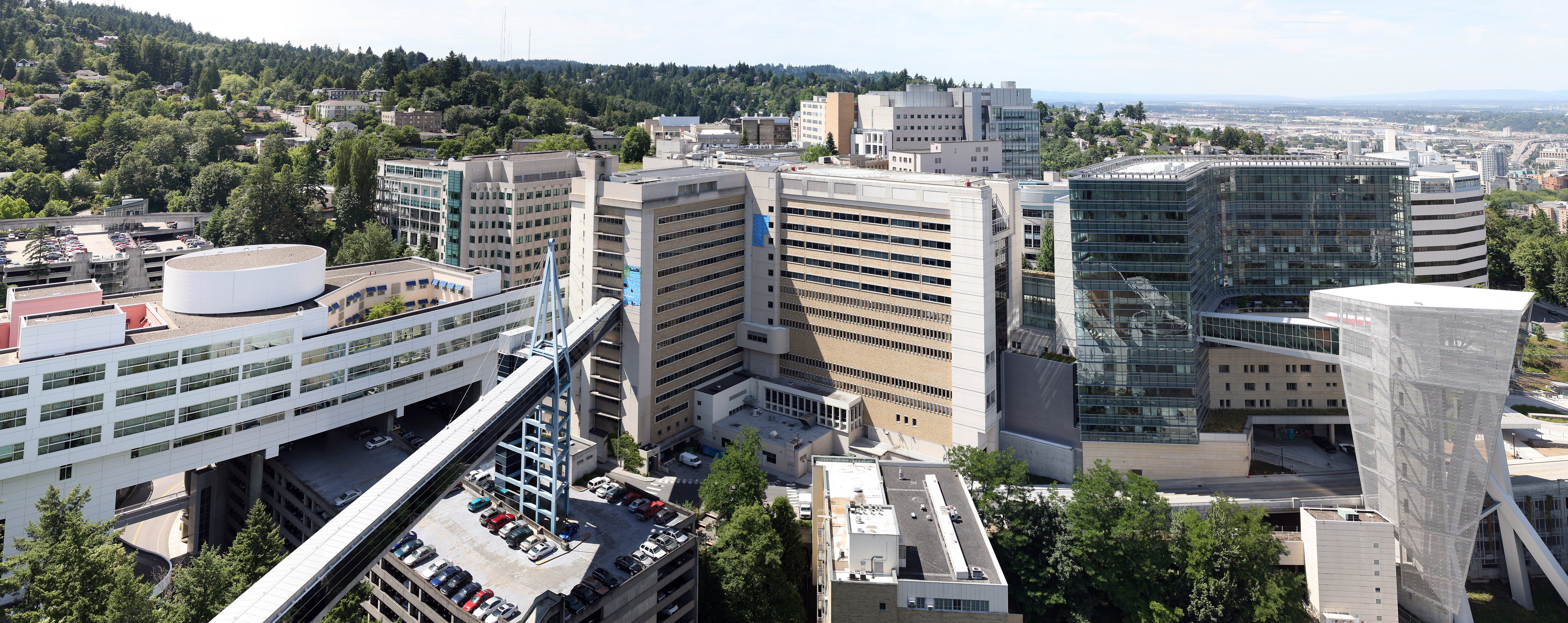
The majority of the OHSU campus is located on Marquam Hill southwest of Downtown Portland.

OHSU has a major medical, dental, and nursing school at its primary campus just south of downtown, in the West Hills. The campus anchors a medical district (affectionately called "Pill Hill") surrounded by other hospitals including a Veterans Affairs Hospital, Portland Shriners Hospital, and Doernbecher Children's Hospital.

Schools of alternative medicine include Oregon College of Oriental Medicine, the National University of Natural Medicine, and Western States Chiropractic College.

=== Law schools ===
Portland's only law school is Lewis & Clark Law School, affiliated with Lewis & Clark College.

=== Art schools ===
These include the Art Institute of Portland, Pacific Northwest College of Art, Oregon College of Art and Craft, Portland Fashion Institute and Northwest Film Center.

=== Other private schools ===
- Oregon Culinary Institute
- Pensole

== Weekend educational programs ==
The Portland Japanese School, a weekend Japanese educational program for Japanese citizens and Japanese Americans, holds its classes at Hazelbrook Middle School at Tualatin and has its school office in Beaverton. The school first opened in 1971 and students come from areas throughout the Portland metropolitan area.
