= Odighizuwa =

Odighizuwa is a surname. Notable people with the surname include:

- Osa Odighizuwa (born 1998), American football player
- Owa Odighizuwa (born 1992), American football player
- Peter Odighizuwa, Nigerian-American perpetrator of the 2002 Appalachian School of Law shooting
