= Azbuka Academy =

Public charter school in Portland, Oregon, U.S.

Azbuka Academy was a public charter school project of Slavic Youth of America in Portland, Oregon. Operating under an agreement with the David Douglas School Board, it opened in September 2008 at a church building on Northeast Glisan Street and operated for two school years before closing. In its final year, it enrolled 50 students in ninth, 10th and 11th grades.

After the David Douglas board ended the agreement, Azbuka sought a review from the Oregon State Board of Education, which upheld the termination. In November 2010, Azbuka sued the Oregon State Board of Education, Oregon State Superintendent of Public Instruction Susan Castillo, and the Oregon Department of Education on grounds that the agreement had been wrongfully terminated. It asked the Multnomah County Circuit Court to reinstate the agreement so the school could reopen.

The school was Oregon's first charter high school with a focus on Russian language and culture. Board members who dissented from approving the original agreement had suggested that David Douglas High School should be given time to improve its Russian-language, culture, and literature offerings before supporting the charter school. There were also concerns that the planned programming might not meet the needs of the academy's proposed students, those not doing well in traditional schools. Only two of 20 students later tested as part of a Portland State University study met achievement standards, according to the hearings officer for the state.
