= Isaac Bonton =

American basketball player (born 1998)

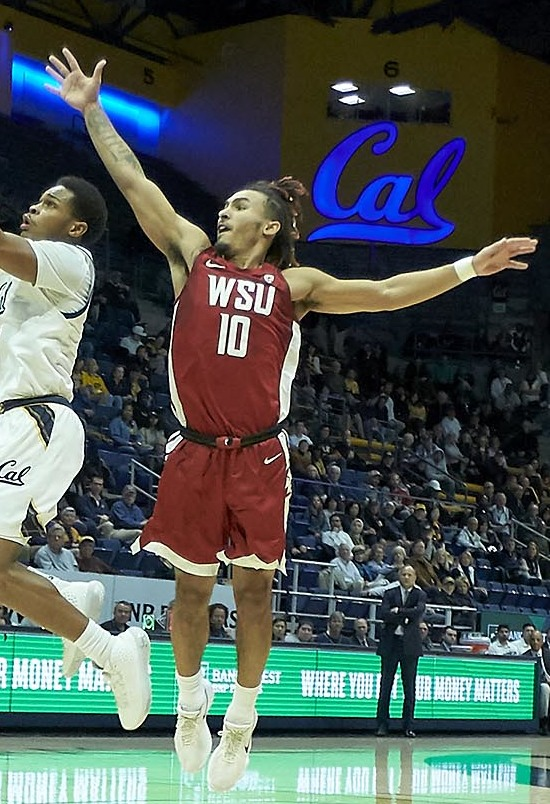
- Bonton with Washington State in 2020

No. 1 – BC Yambol
- Position: Point guard
- League: National Basketball League (Bulgaria)

Personal information
- Born: July 15, 1998 (age 28)
- Listed height: 6 ft 3 in (1.91 m)
- Listed weight: 190 lb (86 kg)

Career information
- High school: Columbia Christian (Portland, Oregon); Parkrose (Portland, Oregon)
- College: Montana State (2017–2018); Casper (2018–2019); Washington State (2019–2021)
- NBA draft: 2021: undrafted
- Playing career: 2021–present

Career history
- 2021–2022: Neptūnas Klaipėda
- 2022–2023: Cafeteros de Armenia
- 2023–present: Yambol

Career highlights
- Second-team All-Pac-12 (2021)

Isaac Bonton (born July 15, 1998) is an American professional basketball player for BC Yambol of the National Basketball League (Bulgaria) (NBL). He played college basketball for the Montana State Bobcats, the Casper Thunderbirds, and the Washington State Cougars.

== High school career ==
Bonton attended Columbia Christian Schools in Portland, Oregon. As a freshman, he played alongside Kameron Chatman and won the Class 1A state title. For his final three years, Bonton transferred to Parkrose High School in Portland. He missed part of his senior season due to a shoulder injury and completed high school as a three-time All-State selection. Bonton originally committed to playing college basketball for Portland before switching his commitment to Montana State because of a coaching change.

== College career ==
Bonton left Montana State after 11 games in his freshman season due to disagreements with head coach Brian Fish. He averaged 7.8 points and 2.8 rebounds per game. Bonton transferred to Casper College, averaging 21.4 points, 5.6 assists and 5.5 rebounds per game as a sophomore. He led his team to a Region IX title and was named a Second Team National Junior College Athletic Association Division I All-American. For his junior season, Bonton moved to Washington State, choosing the Cougars over Kansas State and West Virginia. On January 18, 2020, he recorded a season-high 34 points, eight rebounds and eight assists in an 89–76 win over Oregon State. As a junior, Bonton averaged 15.3 points, four assists and 3.7 rebounds per game. He set the program record for free throw percentage during Pac-12 play, shooting 88.6 percent.

== Professional career ==
On September 29, 2021, Bonton signed his first professional contract with Neptūnas Klaipėda of the Lithuanian Basketball League.

== Career statistics ==
Legend
GP	Games played	GS	Games started	MPG	Minutes per game
FG%	Field goal percentage	3P%	3-point field goal percentage	FT%	Free throw percentage
RPG	Rebounds per game	APG	Assists per game	SPG	Steals per game
BPG	Blocks per game	PPG	Points per game	**Bold**	Career high

=== College ===
==== NCAA Division I ====
Year	Team	GP	GS	MPG	FG%	3P%	FT%	RPG	APG	SPG	BPG	PPG
2017–18	Montana State	11	0	18.6	.360	**.364**	.762	2.8	1.4	.8	**.2**	7.8
2019–20	Washington State	**28**	**27**	32.8	.340	.307	**.833**	3.7	**4.0**	1.2	**.2**	15.3
2020–21	Washington State	21	20	**35.3**	**.391**	.328	.658	**4.0**	**4.0**	**2.0**	**.2**	**17.7**
Career		60	47	31.1	.362	.319	.744	3.6	3.5	1.4	.2	14.8

==== JUCO ====
Year	Team	GP	GS	MPG	FG%	3P%	FT%	RPG	APG	SPG	BPG	PPG
2018–19	Casper	31	31	28.8	.436	.365	.843	5.5	5.6	1.8	.5	21.4

== Personal life ==
Bonton's childhood friend and former Portland State basketball player, Deante Strickland, was shot and killed in August 2019. He dedicates every game he plays to Strickland and his late grandmother.
