= Raye Renfro =

American football player (1940–1978)

Raye Renfo
Profile
- Position: Fullback

Personal information
- Born: June 1, 1940; Houston, Texas, U.S.
- Died: June 7, 1978 (aged 38); Portland, Oregon, U.S.
- Listed height: 6 ft 3 in (1.91 m)
- Listed weight: 210 lb (95 kg)

Career information
- High school: Jefferson (OR)
- College: Columbia Basin (1960–1961); Portland State (1962)

Raye Stephen Renfro (June 1, 1940 – June 7, 1978) was an American football and track and field athlete for Columbia Basin College and Portland State University.

== Early life ==
Born in Houston, his family moved to Portland, where he attended Jefferson High School, starring as a two-way football player, in track and field and basketball.

In 1957 and 1958, he contributed to his team achieving a 23-0 record, including two Class A-1 football state championships. The Democrats 1958 team is regarded as one of the greatest in Oregon prep history, in that season he broke the Portland Interscholastic League record with 24 touchdowns and was part of a backfield that included him at fullback, quarterback Terry Baker (Heisman Trophy winner at Oregon State University), his younger brother Mel Renfro at halfback (future Pro Football Hall of Famer) and halfback Mickey Hergert (one of the leading ground gainers in the nation at Lewis & Clark College). He received Prep All-American honors as a senior.

In track he was the state record holder in the broad jump and in the 120-yard high hurdles. He also was the state champion in the 100-yard dash (9.9 seconds in 1959) and in the 880-yard relay team.

== College career ==
Because of academic problems, he enrolled at Columbia Basin College from 1960 to 1961.

Renfro for his time had an excellent size/speed ratio, being 6–3 feet, around 210 pounds and could run the 100 yard in 9.6 seconds. He was the starter at fullback, sharing the running duties with halfback Jim Wickwire. In his first year the football team went 8-1, losing only to Wenatchee Valley College, which was coached at the time by future Pro Football Hall of Famer Don Coryell.

He transferred to Portland State University in 1962, reuniting with his former high school coach Tom DeSylvia. He didn't graduate from college, choosing to drop out of school.

== Portland Thunderbirds (semi-pro football) ==
In 1966 he signed with the Portland Thunderbirds of the Pacific Coast League, where he was used as a two-way player.

== Personal life ==
Raye married Virginia Smith on October 21, 1972 in Portland, Oregon, and adopted her three sons, Edward, Brent, and Scott. After years of trying for a child of their own, they welcomed a daughter on October 17, 1975, Candeese Rae Renfro. Soon after his daughter was born, Raye Renfro succumbed to his battle with pancreatitis and diabetes, on June 7, 1978. He was 38 years old.
