= List of dance companies in Oregon =

Dance companies in Oregon, listed below, include organizations based in Multnomah, Washington, and Lane counties.

== Multnomah County ==
- BodyVox
- Do Jump
- The Jefferson Dancers
- Oregon Ballet Theatre

== Washington County ==
- NW Fusion Dance Company

== Lane County ==
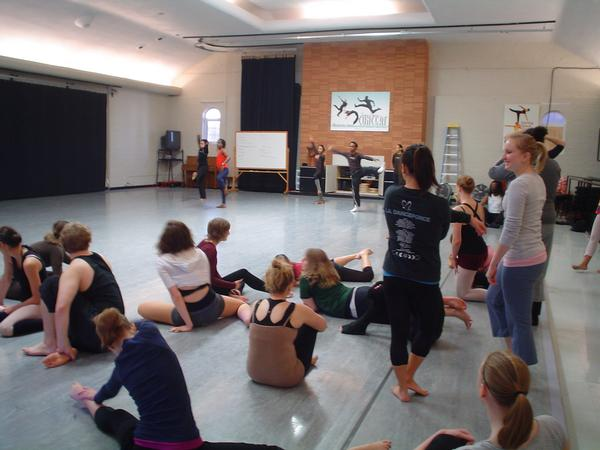
Members of Garth Fagan Dance Company prepare for a "master class" at Western Oregon University.

- Ballet Fantastique
- Eugene Ballet
