= Pacific Crest =

The Pacific Crest is the highest portion of the Sierra Nevada and Cascade Range mountain ranges on the West Coast of the United States.

Pacific Crest may also refer to:

- Pacific Crest Trail, a long-distance hiking trail
- Pacific Crest Drum and Bugle Corps, a competitive drum and bugle corps based in Diamond Bar, California
- Pacific Crest Community School, a private alternative school in Portland, Oregon
- Pacific Crest Bicycle Trail, a road-based bicycle touring route that parallels the Pacific Crest Trail
- American Music Program Pacific Crest Jazz Orchestra, a jazz band and magnet school program in Portland, Oregon
