= Mel Renfro =

American football player (born 1941)

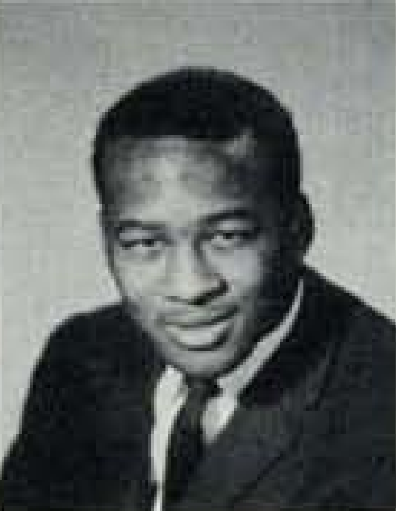
- Renfro from 1962 Oregana yearbook

No. 20
- Position: Cornerback

Personal information
- Born: December 30, 1941 (age 84); Houston, Texas, U.S.
- Listed height: 6 ft 0 in (1.83 m)
- Listed weight: 190 lb (86 kg)

Career information
- High school: Jefferson (Portland, Oregon)
- College: Oregon
- NFL draft: 1964: 2nd round, 17th overall pick
- AFL draft: 1964: 10th round, 79th overall pick

Career history
- Dallas Cowboys (1964–1977)

Awards and highlights
- 2× Super Bowl champion (VI, XII); 4× Second-team All-Pro (1964, 1965, 1969, 1972); 10× Pro Bowl (1964–1973); NFL interceptions leader (1969); NFL kickoff return yards leader (1964); Dallas Cowboys Ring of Honor; Consensus All-American (1962); Second-team All-American (1963); 2× First-team All-PCC (1962, 1963)

Career NFL statistics
- Games: 174
- Interceptions: 52
- Interception yards: 626
- Touchdowns: 3
- Stats at Pro Football Reference
- Pro Football Hall of Fame
- College Football Hall of Fame

Melvin Lacy Renfro (born December 30, 1941) is an American former professional football player who spent his entire 14-year career as a cornerback for the Dallas Cowboys of the National Football League (NFL). He is a member of the Pro Football Hall of Fame.

== Early life ==
Born in Houston, Texas, Renfro moved with his family to Portland, Oregon, and he attended its Jefferson High School, starring as a two-way football player and track and field athlete. As a sophomore and junior, he contributed to his team achieving a 23–0 record, including consecutive Class A-1 football state championships in 1957 and 1958. The Democrats' 1958 team is regarded as one of the greatest in Oregon prep history, which had a backfield that included him at halfback, quarterback Terry Baker (1962 Heisman Trophy winner at Oregon State), halfback Mickey Hergert (one of the leading ground gainers in the nation at Lewis & Clark College) and his brother Raye Renfro at fullback (in 1958 he broke a Portland Interscholastic League record with 24 touchdowns). After Baker graduated, Renfro saw playing time at quarterback as a senior in 1959 and was also an all-state selection at running back, as Jefferson pursued a third consecutive title. They again advanced to the championship game, played before more than 21,000 at Multnomah Stadium in Portland, but lost 7–6 to Medford.

In track as a junior in 1959, he helped Jefferson win the team title by winning the 180-yard low hurdles, the 120-yard high hurdles (breaking the state record) and the broad jump state titles. In 1960, he broke two Oregon junior AAU championship records with a 120-yard high hurdles of 13.9 seconds and 19.3 seconds in the 180-yard low hurdles. Renfro also collected 32 points outscoring every team except one, recording the state record with a 24.1 broad jump and winning the low hurdles, high hurdles and the half-mile relay team. He was named outstanding athlete in the Golden West Invitational track meet, which brought annually the nation's top high school seniors. He was Track and Field News "High School Athlete of the Year" in 1960.

In 1983, Renfro was inducted into the Oregon Sports Hall of Fame. In 1995, he was inducted into the National High School Hall of Fame.

== College career ==
In 1960, Renfro enrolled at the University of Oregon in Eugene, where he excelled for the track team and as a two-way football player, an All-American halfback and defensive back. In football, he earned All-Coast recognition three times and is one of only two two-time All-Americans (Steve Barnett is the other player) in university history. He is also the second two-sport All-American in university history, the first one was George Shaw in football and baseball.

In 1992, Renfro was inducted into the University of Oregon Athletic Hall of Fame.

=== Football ===
From the start of his sophomore season, Renfro received recognition as one of the best and most complete running backs in college football, being able to run inside or outside, catch, block and play special teams. In 1963, he was even named the team's backup quarterback.

One of Renfro's best collegiate games took place against Rice at Houston in 1962. Renfro shone on both offense and defense, leading the Ducks to a 31–12 victory on October 13. Rice Stadium had been a whites-only facility prior to the Ducks' visit, but university officials allowed Renfro's family to enter and sit in a special section of the stadium near the 35-yard line. According to a contemporary account in the Register-Guard, when Renfro left the game, he was given a loud and appreciative ovation by the Rice crowd.

An Oregon sportswriter asked a Houston counterpart in the press box if an African-American had ever received such an ovation by a predominantly white crowd. The Texan enthusiastically replied, "We've never seen any player that good!" The morning after the game, a Houston paper headlined, "Renfro Runs Rice Ragged."

Renfro led Oregon in rushing three straight seasons (1961–63), finishing with a career total 1,540 yards and 23 touchdowns. He still holds the university's career record for highest average per play at 6.01 yards. Renfro also had 41 catches for 644 yards and five touchdowns, very impressive numbers in an era when running backs usually did not catch more than 10 passes during a season.

In 1986, Renfro was enshrined in the College Football Hall of Fame and is a member of The Pigskin Club of Washington, D.C., a National Intercollegiate All-American Football Players Honor Roll. He is considered to be the best running back in the history of the University of Oregon, other than LaMichael James.

=== Track and field ===
From 1960 through 1965, the Oregon's men's track and field team led by coach Bill Bowerman was one of the best in the United States. In 1962, Renfro contributed to the university's first NCAA team championship by finishing second behind teammate Jerry Tarr in the 120-yard (110 m) high hurdles with a 13.8 time and third in the long jump with a 25'-11¼" (7.905 m) leap.

That year, Renfro was part of a world-record-setting 440-yard relay team with a time of 40.0 seconds; his running mates were Tarr, Mike Gaechter and Harry Jerome. At the end of the year, he was named to the All-American track and field team in the high hurdles and the broad jump.

In 1963, Renfro injured his knee on a foul broad jump in the NCAA Championships. In the same meet at Albuquerque, despite the injury, he entered the high hurdles but failed to qualify.

== Professional career ==
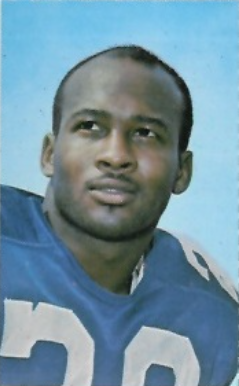
1969 stamp of Renfro for Dallas Cowboys

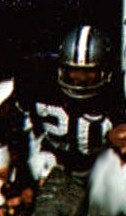
Renfro in Super Bowl V in January 1971

Renfro was drafted in the second round of the 1964 NFL draft, 17th overall, by the Dallas Cowboys. The selection delayed the draft for six hours, while the Cowboys sent a doctor to check an injury he suffered on his wrist.

Cowboys coach Tom Landry, looking to build a dominating defense, started Renfro at safety. As a rookie, Renfro led the team with seven interceptions, led the NFL in both punt return and kickoff return yardage (including a franchise-record 273 total return yards against the Green Bay Packers), and received an invitation to the Pro Bowl. The 30 yards per kick-off return average he posted in his second year (1965) still remains a franchise record.

In 1966, despite Renfro coming off an All-Pro season at safety, the Cowboys named him their starting halfback in an effort to improve its offense. He was injured in the opening game against the New York Giants and replaced by Dan Reeves, who was so impressive that Renfro was moved back to defense when he returned to action and would end up being named to the All-Pro team again.

Renfro was switched to cornerback in his fifth season. The speedy Renfro (4.65 40-yd dash) became an exceptional threat to wide receivers, leading the NFL with 10 interceptions in 1969. Renfro was selected to the Pro Bowl in each of his first ten seasons in the league, including five All-Pro selections in 1964, 1965, 1969, 1971 and 1973. He was named the offensive MVP of the 1971 Pro Bowl for his two punt return touchdowns.

In his 14 seasons, Renfro intercepted 52 passes, returning them for 626 yards and three touchdowns. He also returned 109 punts for 842 yards and one touchdown, 85 kickoffs for 2,246 yards and two touchdowns, along with recording 13 fumble recoveries, which he returned for 44 yards. In the 1970 NFC Championship Game, Renfro had a key interception that led to the Cowboys' game-winning touchdown over the San Francisco 49ers that helped them get to Super Bowl V, where they lost to the Baltimore Colts, 16–13. In an enduring image from the game after Jim O'Brien's game-winning kick, Renfro put his face in his hands in disappointment. Dallas returned in Super Bowls VI, X, and XII, Renfro's last NFL game, a Cowboys' 27–10 victory over the Denver Broncos. He remains the Cowboys' all-time leader in interceptions with 52 (In 1969 he led the NFL in interceptions with 10) and in career kickoff-return average (26.4 yards). His 14 seasons with the team ties him for second place in franchise history.

Renfro joined the Dallas Cowboys Ring of Honor in 1981 and was elected to the Pro Football Hall of Fame in 1996. During his time with the Cowboys, even though one of his teammates was former Olympic gold medalist and one-time world's fastest man Bob Hayes, many experts still considered him the best athlete on the team.

== Personal life ==
In 1984, Renfro coached the defensive secondary under John Hadl with the Los Angeles Express of the United States Football League (USFL). In 1986 he was part of Gene Stallings St. Louis Cardinals coaching staff as his defensive backs coach.

In the early 1980s, Renfro had financial and legal challenges. He currently works as a motivational speaker. Renfro has four children. He was married to Patricia Renfro through his entire career.
