= Floyd Simmons (American football) =

American football player (1925–1996)

No. 83
- Position: Running back

Personal information
- Born: February 19, 1925; Portland, Oregon, U.S.
- Died: August 6, 1996 (aged 71); Portland, Oregon, U.S.
- Listed height: 6 ft 1 in (1.85 m)
- Listed weight: 200 lb (91 kg)

Career information
- High school: Jefferson (Portland)
- College: Notre Dame (1945–1947)
- NFL draft: 1948: 24th round, 223rd overall pick

Career history
- Chicago Rockets (1948)

Awards and highlights
- 2× National champion (1946, 1947)

Career AAFC statistics
- Rushing yards: 121
- Rushing average: 3.4
- Receptions: 2
- Receiving yards: 60
- Total touchdowns: 2
- Stats at Pro Football Reference

Floyd Weston Simmons (February 19, 1925 – August 6, 1996) was an American professional football running back who played one season with the Chicago Rockets of the All-America Football Conference (AAFC). He was selected by the Pittsburgh Steelers in the 24th round of the 1948 NFL draft after playing college football at the University of Notre Dame.

== Early life ==
Floyd Weston Simmons was born on February 19, 1925, in Portland, Oregon. He played football and baseball at Jefferson High School in Portland. He earned second-team All-City honors as a halfback his junior season. He garnered first-team All-City recognition as a senior after leading the Portland Interscholastic League (PIL) in scoring with ten touchdowns and four extra points. Simmons was inducted into the PIL Hall of Fame in 2002.

== College career ==
Simmons first played college football at Willamette University. He then played for the Notre Dame Fighting Irish of the University of Notre Dame from 1945 to 1947. He rushed 14 times for 42 yards in 1945. In 1946, he recorded 36 carries for 229 yards and two catches for 43 yards as the Fighting Irish were named AP Poll national champions. Simmons rushed 26 times for 73 yards and caught four passes for 32 yards in 1947 as the team were named AP Poll national champions for the second consecutive seasons. He played in the Chicago Charities College All-Star Game after his senior year.

== Professional career ==
Simmons was selected by the Pittsburgh Steelers in the 24th round, with the 223rd overall pick, of the 1948 NFL draft. He signed with the Chicago Rockets of the All-America Football Conference on June 29, 1948. He played in 11 games, starting two, for the Rockets during the 1948 season, totaling 36 rushing attempts for 121 yards and one touchdown, two receptions for 60 yards and one touchdown, and three kick returns for 77 yards.

== Personal life ==
Simmons died on August 6, 1996, in Portland, Oregon.
