= Mary Vinton Folberg =

Mary Vinton Folberg attending the 2006 Club Cabaret fundraising event for the Northwest Academy

Mary Vinton Folberg is the former Head of School at Northwest Academy, a former teacher, and former dancer. She was Miss Oregon in 1958. She founded the dance program at Jefferson High School in Portland, Oregon, which has become internationally recognized within the dance community. The performing leg of the Jefferson High School dance department is The Jefferson Dancers, which performs locally, nationally, and occasionally even internationally. The Portland, Oregon, newsweekly Willamette Week has referred to The Jefferson Dancers as "Portland's best dance company". Mary also has two twin daughters, Lisa and Rachel Folberg. After leaving Jefferson High School in 1995, Folberg founded The Northwest Academy, which is an independent, college-preparatory, middle- and high-school program in downtown Portland with a unique academic and arts partnership. She was born in 1940, and holds degrees in literature and dance and taught in California and Oregon public schools. Folberg is the 2013 recipient of Portland Monthly magazine's Light A Fire Award for Lifetime Achievement. She also is the recipient of a 1981 Kennedy Center Award for Excellence in Arts Education and the Metropolitan Arts Commission (now Regional Arts & Culture Council) Award in 1982, 1988, and 1989.

Mary Vinton Folberg is the sister of Will Vinton, creator of Claymation. Folberg was featured in Images of Oregon Women, published by Madison Press.

== Gallery ==
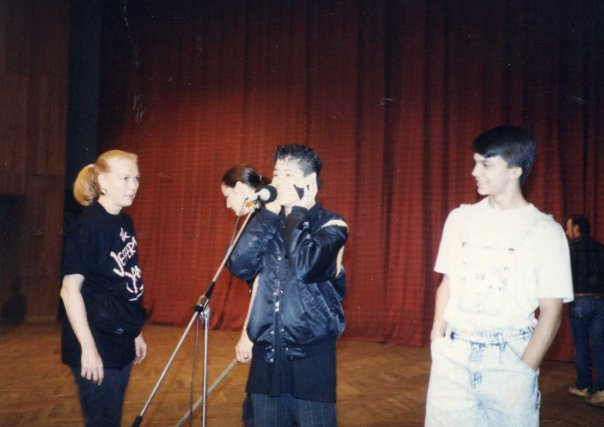
Mary Folberg in sound check for The Jefferson Dancers during 1991 Soviet tour

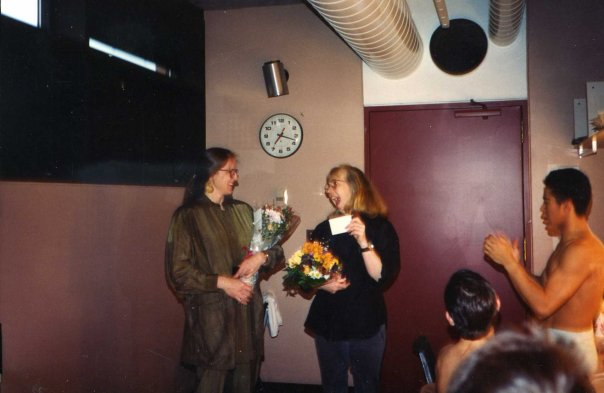
Mary Folberg receiving flowers from dancers in dressing room of Portland Center for the Performing Arts
