= Owa Odighizuwa =

American football player (born 1992)

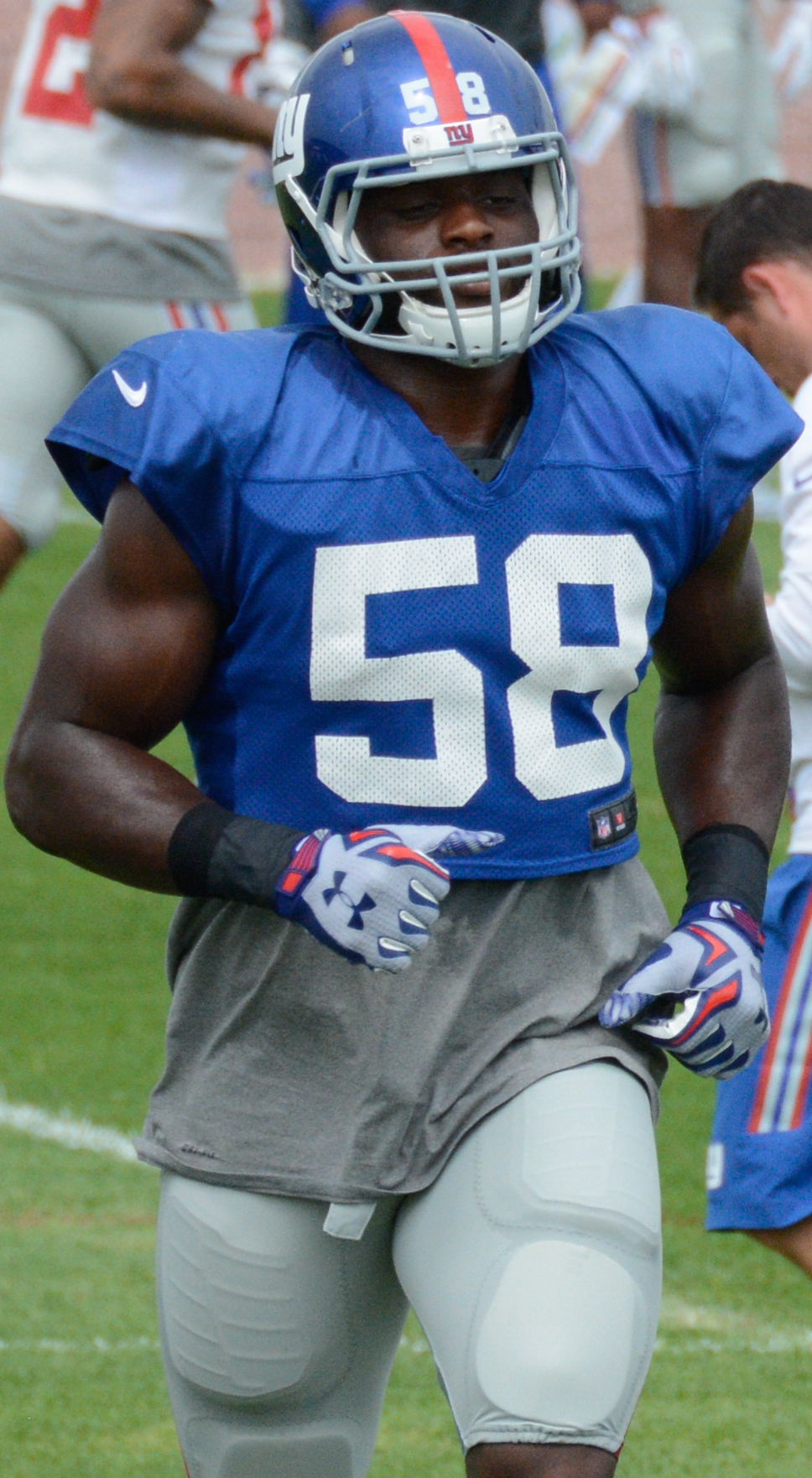
- Odighizuwa with the New York Giants in 2016

No. 58
- Position: Defensive end

Personal information
- Born: April 1, 1992 (age 34); Columbus, Ohio, U.S.
- Listed height: 6 ft 3 in (1.91 m)
- Listed weight: 270 lb (122 kg)

Career information
- High school: David Douglas (Portland, Oregon)
- College: UCLA (2010–2014)
- NFL draft: 2015: 3rd round, 74th overall pick

Career history
- New York Giants (2015–2016); Buffalo Bills (2018)*
- * Offseason or practice squad member only

Awards and highlights
- Second-team All-Pac-12 (2014)

Career NFL statistics
- Total tackles: 6
- Stats at Pro Football Reference

Owamagbe Odighizuwa (born April 1, 1992) is an American former professional football player who was a defensive end for the New York Giants of the National Football League (NFL). He played college football for the UCLA Bruins, earning second-team all-conference honors in the Pac-12. He was selected by the Giants in the third round of the 2015 NFL draft.

== Early life ==
Odighizuwa was born in Columbus, Ohio. At the age of 3, he moved to his parents' native country of Nigeria to live with family in the heart of Benin City. He returned to the United States five years later, moving to Portland, Oregon in 2001. He grew up playing soccer in Nigeria, and by the time he reached junior high in the David Douglas School District, he was more into track & field and basketball. It wasn't until eighth grade that he decided to play football. He attended David Douglas High School, playing all four seasons for the school. As a senior, he made 90 tackles, including 10 sacks, and recorded 96 tackles, 22 for loss, as a junior. He was selected to play in the 2010 U.S. Army All-American Bowl in San Antonio, Texas. And was one of a handful of national players named an All-American by USA Today. In track, Odighizuwa competed as a sprinter (7.44 in the 60m and 11.8 in the 100m) and as a shot putter (top-throw of 48-7 or 14.86m).

Considered a five-star recruit by Rivals.com, Odighizuwa was rated as the second best weakside defensive end prospect of his class, and drew comparisons to Osi Umenyiora. He accepted a scholarship offer to play college football from UCLA on 2010 National Signing Day.

== College career ==
In 2010, he made six starts as a true freshman for the Bruins, recording 10 tackles and three sacks for the season. In 2011, he appeared in all 14 games, recording 21 tackles including three for loss. In 2012, he saw action in all 14 games, recording 44 tackles, including six for loss and 3.5 sacks. He missed the entire 2013 season recovering from right hip surgery, garnering himself a medical redshirt. He returned in 2014, completely recovered from his injury. He recorded 61 tackles, including 11.5 for loss, six sacks, and five pass breakups, earning himself second-team All-Pac-12 Conference honors.

== Professional career ==
Pre-draft measurables
Height	Weight	Arm length	Hand span	40-yard dash	10-yard split	20-yard split	20-yard shuttle	Three-cone drill	Vertical jump	Broad jump	Bench press
6 ft 3 1/2 in (1.92 m)	267 lb (121 kg)	33 3/4 in (0.86 m)	11 in (0.28 m)	4.62 s	1.61 s	2.69 s	4.19 s	7.36 s	39 in (0.99 m)	10 ft 7 in (3.23 m)	25 reps
All values from NFL Combine

=== New York Giants ===
Odighizuwa was selected by the New York Giants in the third round with the 74th overall pick of the 2015 NFL draft. Comparisons were immediately made between Odighizuwa and former Giants defensive end Justin Tuck, as they were both picked in the third round, 74th overall in the draft, after falling due to injury concerns, and because it was believed that Odighizuwa, like Tuck, could shift inside on passing downs as part of a 4 defensive end pass rush. Unfortunately, due to injuries, his rookie season became essentially a redshirt season for Odighizuwa, as he ended the season on injured reserve.

On August 28, 2017, Odighizuwa was suspended the first four games of the 2017 season for violating the league's performance enhancing drugs policy. The next day, he was released by the Giants.

=== Buffalo Bills ===
On March 8, 2018, Odighizuwa signed with the Buffalo Bills. He was released by the Bills on July 29.

== Personal life ==
Odighizuwa is of Nigerian descent. He has been open about his struggles with depression. His younger brother Osa believes Owa’s mental health issues are the reason his career ended prematurely.

Odighizuwa's father, Peter, was the perpetrator of the 2002 Appalachian School of Law shooting, in which three were killed and three were wounded.
