= The Northwest Academy =

Northwest Academy
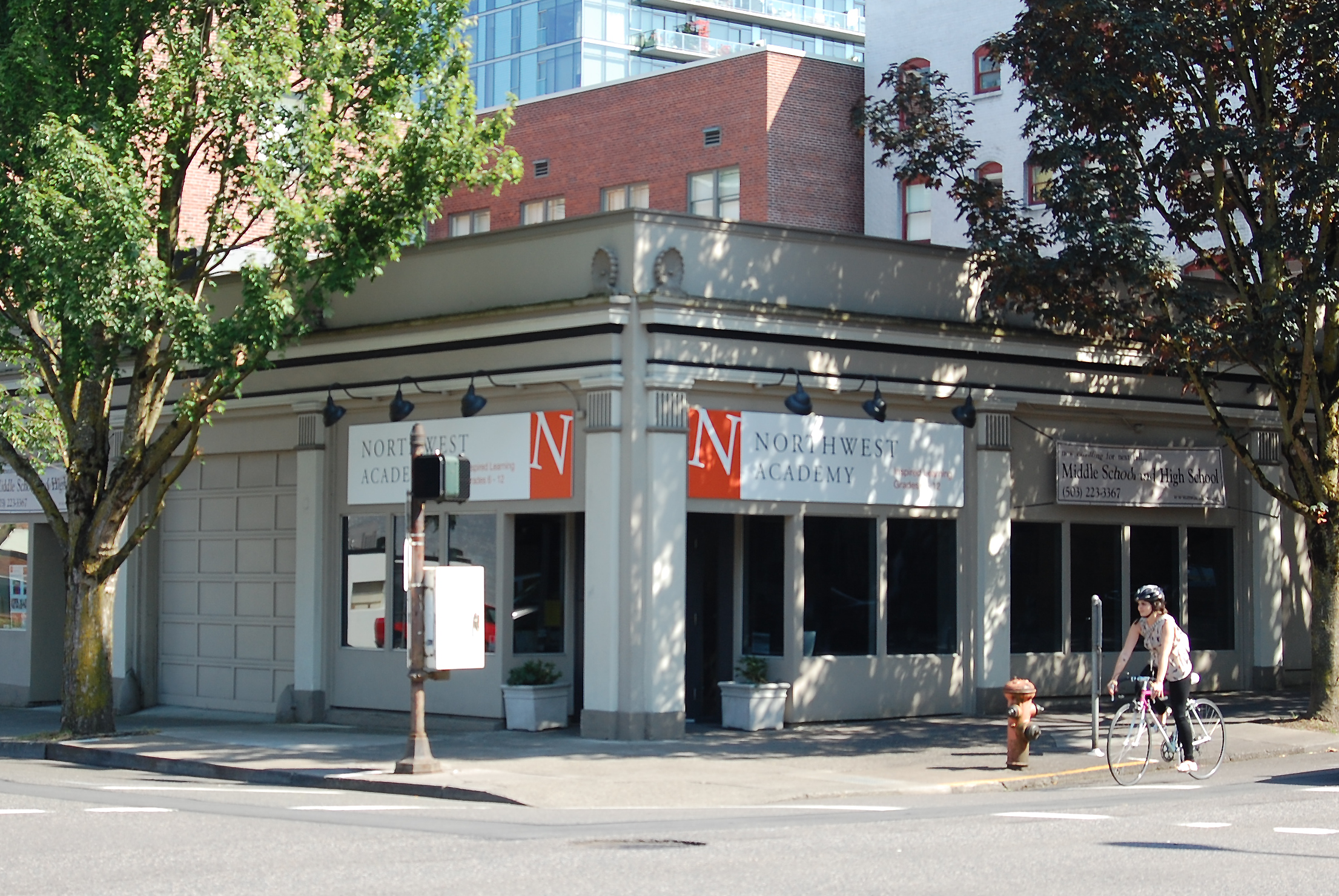

Location
- 1130 SW Main Street; Portland, Multnomah County, Oregon 97205; United States; 45.517815°N 122.685282°W

Information
- Type: Private
- Opened: 1997
- Founder: Mary Vinton Folberg
- Head of school: LA Sales
- Grades: 6-12
- Enrollment: 240 (2024)
- Mascot: Angry Pigeon
- Accreditation: Northwest Association of Independent Schools
- Newspaper: The Pigeon Press
- Website: www.nwacademy.org

Northwest Academy is an independent, arts-focused middle and high school (grades 6–12) in downtown Portland, Oregon, United States. The school is accredited by the Northwest Association of Independent Schools (NWAIS). Teachers include former college instructors and professional artists, directors, dancers, musicians, and writers.

== History ==
The high school was founded in 1997 by Mary Vinton Folberg and had 26 students its first year. Folberg was an English and dance teacher in California before launching the Jefferson High School dance department in Portland in 1969 and then The Jefferson Dancers in 1976. She founded Northwest Academy to develop an arts-focused high school. The middle school was opened in 2002. The total school enrollment was over 240 students for the 2024–2025 school year.

== Notable alumni ==
- Esperanza Spalding – jazz musician

== See also ==
- Do Jump
