= Mickey Hergert =

American athlete and coach (born 1941)

Personal information
- Nationality: American
- Born: December 30, 1941 (age 83) Portland, Oregon, U.S.
- Education: Lewis & Clark

Sport
- Sport: Football
- Position: Running back

Mickey Hergert (born December 30, 1941) is a former American football running back and baseball player and coach in the National Association of Intercollegiate Athletics (NAIA) with Lewis & Clark College.

== Early years ==
Hergert attended Jefferson High School, playing football as a two-way player, basketball and baseball.

As a sophomore (1957) and junior (1958), he contributed to his team achieving a 23–0 record, including two Class A-1 football state championships. The Democrats 1958 team is regarded as one of the greatest in Oregon prep history, which had a backfield that included him at halfback, quarterback Terry Baker (Heisman Trophy winner at Oregon State University), halfback Mel Renfro (future Pro Football Hall of Famer) and Raye Renfro at fullback (in 1958 he broke a Portland Interscholastic League record with 24 touchdowns). He even played some snaps at guard as a senior (1959).

== College career ==
=== University of Washington ===
Hergert accepted a football scholarship from the University of Washington, but decided to transfer to Lewis & Clark College after a few weeks.

=== Lewis & Clark College ===
In accordance to the National Association of Intercollegiate Athletics (NAIA) rules, he sat out his first year but didn't lose any eligibility.

As a senior running back in 1963 he was a Williamson System first team All-American and second team NAIA. During his career he was a four-time all-Northwest Conference selection; in 36 games he averaged 106.5 yards per game(6.1 yards per carry) and scored 296 career points (102 in 8 games as a senior).

He finished his college football career as one of the leading ground gainers in the nation, the leading rusher in the Northwest Conference and Lewis & Clark College history. He was the second leading rusher in NAIA history to Brad Husted by 107 yards, because as a senior his college accepted a game cancellation request from the Oregon College of Education; this canceled game also reduced their possible win total and left them out of the teams selected to advance to the playoffs.

The 1963 football team that he was a part of was one of the greatest in school history, finishing undefeated with an 8–0 overall record. The team outscored its opponents by an average of 25 points a game, including 41–0 and 40–0 blowouts of College of Idaho and Whitworth University, respectively. The game against Pacific University still holds the school record for most yards rushing in a single game (457).

Hergert was also a four-year letterman in baseball, where as an infielder he was named all-Northwest Conference three times. He also lettered one year in basketball.

In 1979, he was inducted into the Lewis & Clark College Hall of Fame.

== Personal life ==
Hergert was the baseball coach at Lewis & Clark College for 12 years, before leaving in 1980 to go into the insurance business. He also was a college and high school basketball official.
