= Kameron Chatman =

American basketball player (born 1996)

Kam Chatman
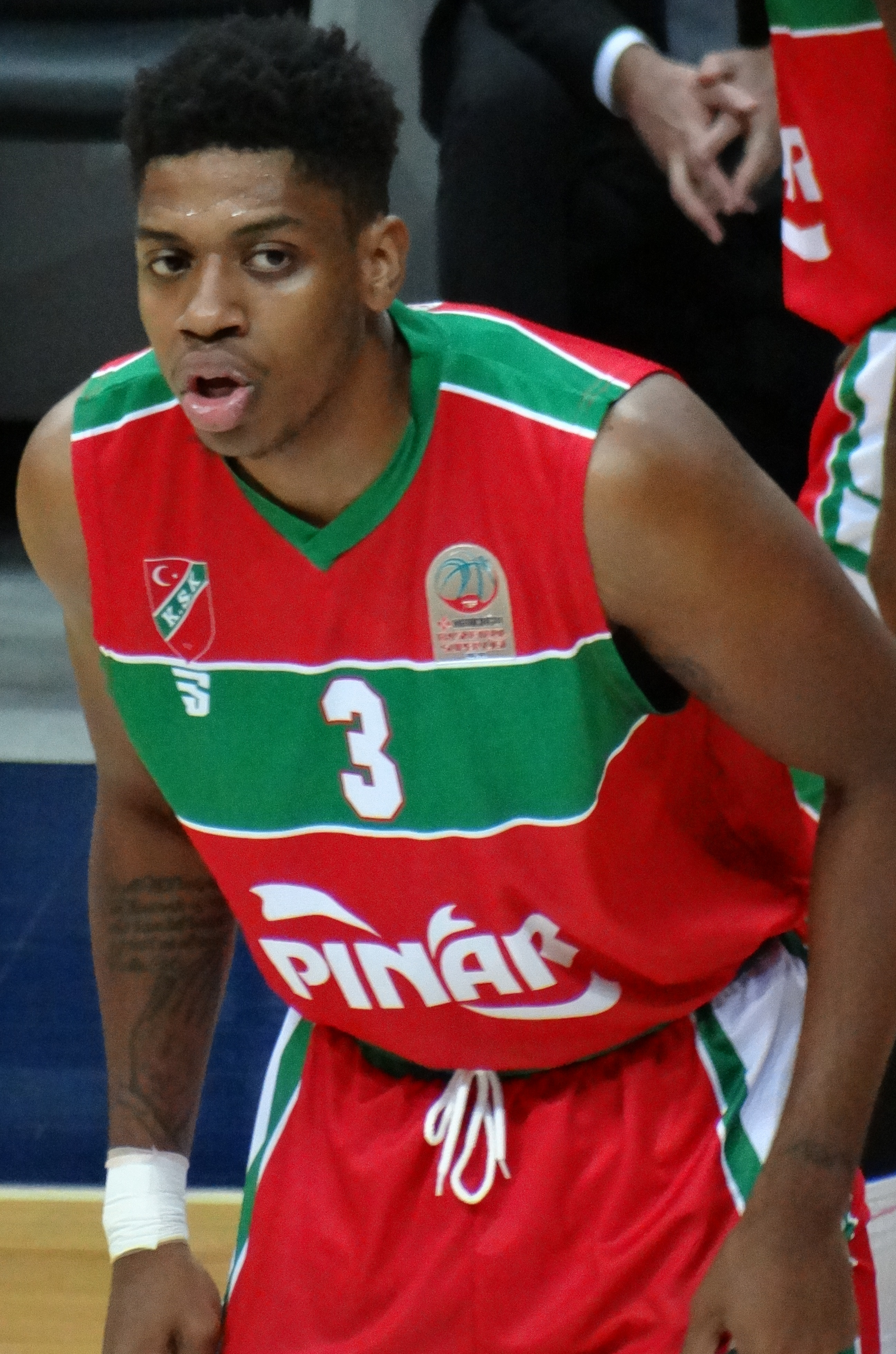
- Chatman in 2018

No. 3 – BK Pardubice
- Position: Shooting guard / small forward
- League: NBL

Personal information
- Born: June 1, 1996 (age 30) Portland, Oregon, US
- Listed height: 6 ft 9 in (2.06 m)
- Listed weight: 225 lb (102 kg)

Career information
- High school: Columbia Christian Schools (Portland, Oregon)
- College: Michigan (2014–2016); Detroit Mercy (2017–2018)
- NBA draft: 2018: undrafted
- Playing career: 2018–present

Career history
- 2018–2019: Pınar Karşıyaka
- 2019: Erie BayHawks
- 2019–2020: Limburg United
- 2021: Ovarense Basquetebol
- 2022–2023: Scarborough Shooting Stars
- 2023–present: KVIS Pardubice

Career highlights
- CEBL champion (2023)

Kam Chatman (born June 1, 1996) is an American professional basketball player for KVIS Pardubice of the National Basketball League (NBL). He played college basketball for the Detroit Titans after transferring from the Michigan Wolverines men's basketball team following his sophomore season. He played high school basketball for Columbia Christian Schools. He was one of 26 players selected for the April 18, 2014 Jordan Brand Classic. He is a cousin of Ndamukong Suh.

== High school career ==
Chatman took official visits to Michigan, Oregon, USC and Arizona in successive weeks in September 2013. Chatman led Columbia Christian to the 2014 Oregon School Activities Association (OSAA) Class 1A championship with a team-high 19 points in the 69–48 victory over Horizon Christian Schools on March 8. He formerly played for varsity basketball for Jefferson High School in Portland, Oregon (2010–12), junior varsity at Long Beach Polytechnic High School in Long Beach, California (2012–13) due to eligibility issues after transferring. He had transferred to Long Beach, where his godfather and travel team coach Sharrief Metoyer was the coach, but the California Interscholastic Federation (CIF) ruled him ineligible for varsity competition for following his travel team coach. Upon returning to Oregon, he chose a small school (Columbia Christian) so that he could focus on his academics with fewer distractions.

When he was named to the Jordan Brand Classic, he was the fourth-highest rated commit in the Big Ten behind Ohio State recruits D'Angelo Russell and Keita Bates-Diop and Indiana's James Blackmon, Jr., according to Rivals.com. Russell and Blackmon were also selected for the Jordan Brand Classic. Chatman scored 7 points and had 2 assists in eleven minutes of play in the game.

On May 5, 2014, USA Basketball announced the 21 athletes (including Chatman) invited to tryout from June 10 to 19 for the 12-member USA national team for the June 20–24, 2014 FIBA Americas Under-18 Championship. Chatman was one of 10 incoming freshman to be selected. Eventually, 24 players tried out for the team and Chatman was eliminated when the roster was cut to 15 on June 12. Chatman planned to enroll at Michigan for the summer semester on June 19 or thereabouts.

College recruiting
Name	Hometown	School	Height	Weight	Commit date
Kameron Chatman; SF	Portland Oregon	Columbia Christian Schools (OR)	6 ft 7 in (2.01 m)	198.5 lb (90.0 kg)	Jan 10, 2013
Kameron Chatman; SF	Recruit ratings: Scout: Rivals: (88)				
Overall recruit ranking: Scout: 23, 6 (SF), 1 (OR) Rivals: 25, 8 (SF), 1 (OR) ESPN: 38, 11 (SF), 1 (OR)
Note: In many cases, Scout, Rivals, 247Sports, On3, and ESPN may conflict in their listings of height and weight.; In these cases, the average was taken. ESPN grades are on a 100-point scale.; Sources: "Michigan 2014 Basketball Commitments". Rivals.; "2014 Michigan Basketball Commits". Scout.; "ESPN". ESPN.; "Scout.com Team Recruiting Rankings". Scout.; "2014 Team Ranking". Rivals.

== College career ==
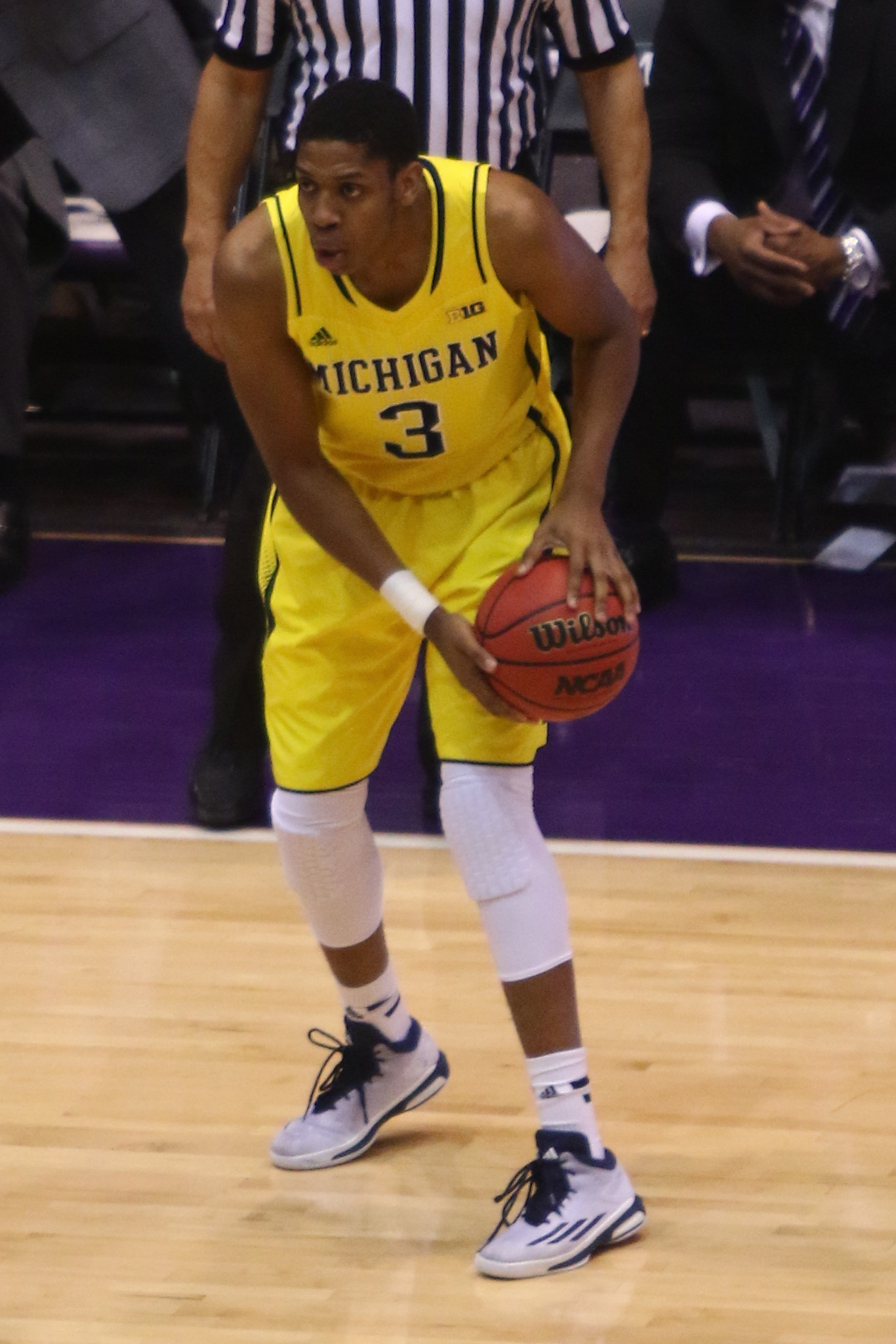
Chatman in 2015

=== Freshman year ===
The 2013–14 Michigan Wolverines men's basketball team had been outright champions of 2013–14 Big Ten Conference and reached the elite eight round of the 2014 NCAA Men's Division I Basketball Tournament, but lost three players to the 2014 NBA draft: Nik Stauskas, Mitch McGary and Glenn Robinson III.

Chatman started in his debut and opened the season with a team-high 4 steals against Hillsdale on November 15. On November 29, he contributed career highs of 11 points and 8 rebounds against Nicholls State. On December 2, he posted a team-high 9 rebounds in a 68–65 victory over Syracuse. On January 6 against Penn State Spike Albrecht replaced Chatman in the starting lineup. On January 17 against Northwestern, Caris LeVert suffered a season-ending injury, but Chatman was also injured in the game. On January 20, the team defeated Rutgers in its first game without LeVert, but with Aubrey Dawkins in the starting lineup (making his first start), not Chatman. On March 7 against Rutgers, Chatman posted his season-high 13 points.

=== Sophomore year ===
Chatman began the season as a starter against Northern Michigan. In the March 11, 2016 Big Ten Conference men's basketball tournament quarterfinals upset of No. 1-seeded (#10 AP Poll/#10 Coaches Poll) Indiana, Chatman scored the game-winning three-point field goal with 0.2 seconds remaining. Following the season, Kameron Chatman announced his intention to transfer with two years of eligibility remaining. On June 8, Chatman he committed to transfer to play at for the Detroit Titans under head coach Bacari Alexander after sitting out one season. Alexander had been a Michigan assistant coach until a few weeks earlier. One week later, his father, Canaan Chatman, was announced as an assistant coach on Alexander's staff.

=== Redshirt junior year ===
Chatman debuted with a team-high 23 points for Detroit Mercy against Virginia Tech on November 10. On November 19, Chatman achieved a double-double when posted 22 points and 16 rebounds in an overtime victory over Houston Baptist. On November 22, Chatman hit the game-winning shot with 2 seconds left as part of an 18-point, 9-rebound effort in a 72–70 victory against St. Louis. Chatman was named Horizon League Player of the Week on November 27. In a November 28 loss to Fort Wayne, Chatman posted a career-high 31 points and 10 rebounds. Through games of January 5, Chatman led the Horizon League in rebounding (8.8) and three-point shooting percentage (46.2%) and was fourth in scoring (18.0), then he was sidelined with an injury. He missed three games before returning to the lineup on January 16. Following the regular season, he was named to the All-Horizon League second team. After a season in which he led his team in scoring (17.8) and rebounding (8.3) and was among the top 10 in the Horizon League in several statistics, he declared for the 2018 NBA draft but did not immediately hire an agent. Although he was not expected to remain eligible for the draft, he eventually hired an agent and forfeited his college eligibility. An issue for him at the time of his decision was that Detroit Mercy had not hired a coach after firing head coach Bacari Alexander two months earlier, leaving the program in disarray.

== Professional career ==
After going undrafted in the 2018 NBA draft, Chatman signed with Pınar Karşıyaka of the Basketbol Süper Ligi. He played 13 games in the Basketbol Süper Ligi and 9 in the 2018–19 FIBA Europe Cup averaging 5.1 points and 2.5 rebounds in 16.7 minutes of action for Pınar Karşıyaka before signing with the Erie BayHawks of the NBA G League.

On October 22, 2019, he has signed with Limburg United of the Pro Basketball League. Chatman averaged 6.5 points and 3.2 rebounds per game.

On September 7, 2021, Chatman signed with Ovarense Basquetebol of the Liga Portuguesa de Basquetebol.

On May 23, 2022, Chatman signed with the Scarborough Shooting Stars of the CEBL.

== Personal life ==
Chatman is a cousin of Ndamukong Suh who played defensive tackle for the nearby Detroit Lions when Chatman went to Michigan.
