= The Jefferson Dancers =

Performance group at Jefferson High School in Portland, USA

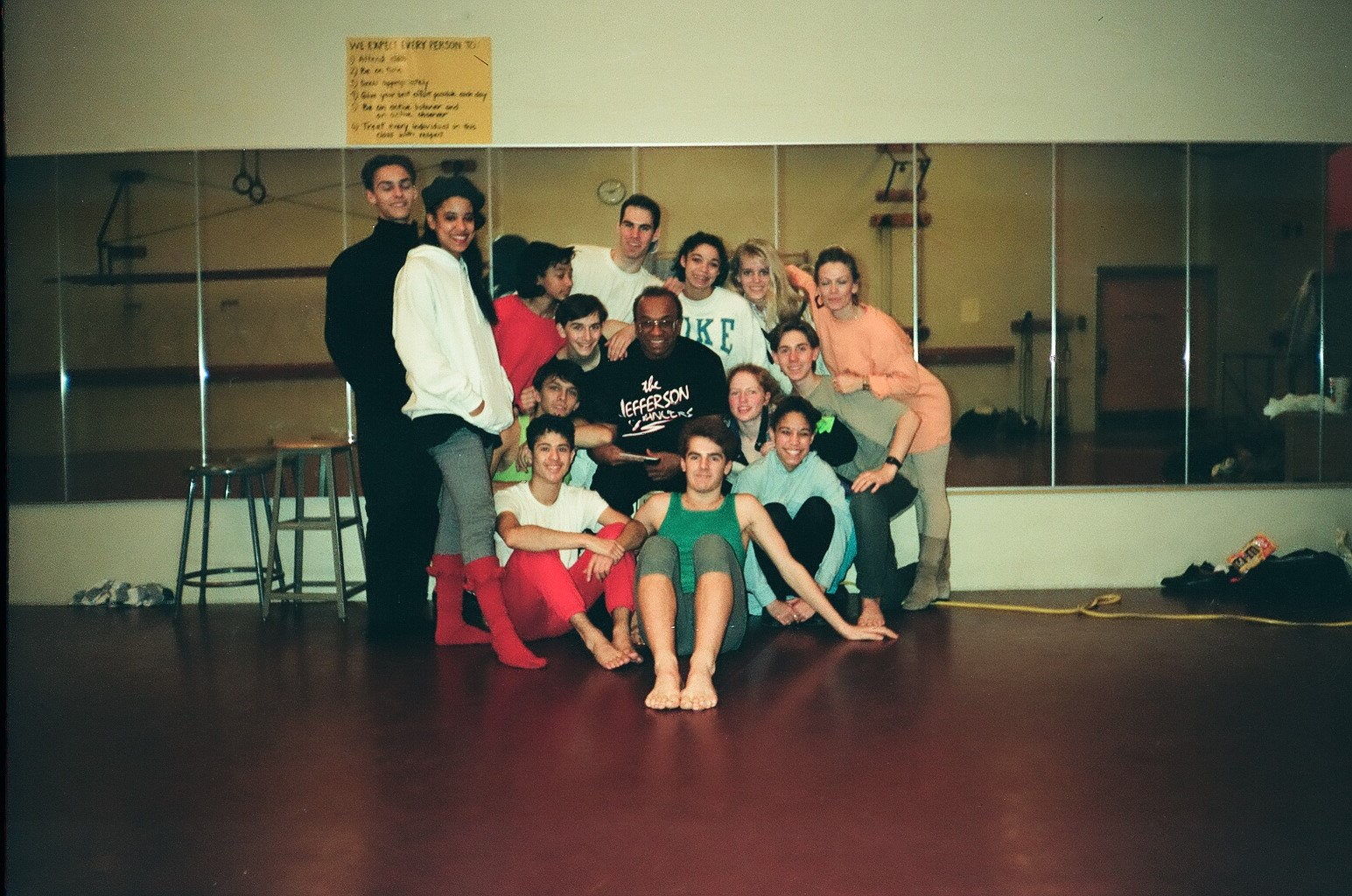
Choreographer Donald McKayle (seated, center) posed with members of The Jefferson Dancers in 1992, after a week-long rehearsal wherein he taught the company two of his signature dances: "Games" and "Rainbow 'Round My Shoulder".

The Jefferson Dancers are a company of dancers who attend Jefferson High School Middle College for Advanced Studies in Portland, Oregon. Here, the school's most advanced dance students take pre-professional dance training, and attend daily 90-minute technique classes followed by three hours of rehearsal.

The company was founded by Mary Vinton Folberg in the early 1980s. Folberg served as artistic director of the dance company from its founding until the mid-1990s. In 1992, Folberg went on sabbatical, during which Julane Stites served as artistic director of the company. That year, the company was the subject of the 30-minute Public Broadcasting Service (PBS) program titled A Musical Encounter: The Dance Program. Stites left the program for the Arts & Communication Magnet Academy in Beaverton in 1999.

In 1995, Folberg left the dance department of Jefferson High School to found The Northwest Academy, an alternative arts high school in Portland. Program alumni and MOMIX dancer Steve Gonzales has served as artistic director since 1999.

== See also ==
- List of dance companies in Oregon
