= Village Free School =

School in Oregon, United States

Coordinates: 45.48095°N 122.5736°W

Information
- Established: 2004; 22 years ago
- Age: 5 to 18
- Website: www.villagefreeschool.org

The Village Free School (VFS) is a 501(c)(3) non-profit private primary and secondary school located in Portland, Oregon, United States.

The school was founded in 2004 and enrolls students between the ages of 5 and 18.
