= Osa Odighizuwa =

Nigerian American football player (born 1998)

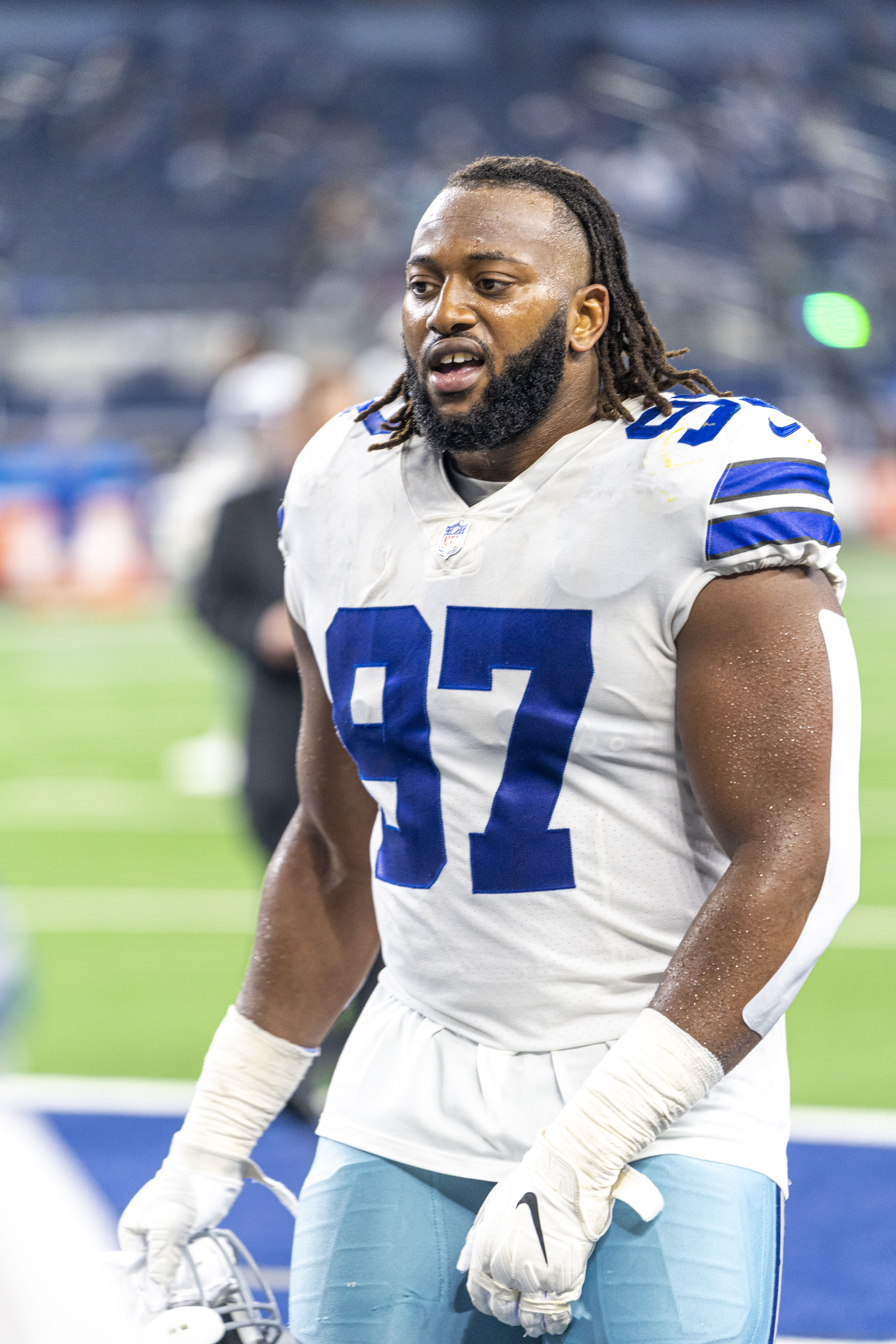
- Odighizuwa with the Dallas Cowboys in 2021

No. 92 – San Francisco 49ers
- Position: Defensive tackle
- Roster status: Active

Personal information
- Born: August 13, 1998 (age 28); Dayton, Ohio, U.S.
- Listed height: 6 ft 2 in (1.88 m)
- Listed weight: 280 lb (127 kg)

Career information
- High school: David Douglas (Portland, Oregon)
- College: UCLA (2016–2020)
- NFL draft: 2021: 3rd round, 75th overall pick

Career history
- Dallas Cowboys (2021–2025); San Francisco 49ers (2026–present)

Awards and highlights
- First-team All-Pac-12 (2020)

Career NFL statistics as of Week 10, 2026
- Total tackles: 237
- Sacks: 19.0
- Pass deflections: 2
- Forced fumbles: 2
- Stats at Pro Football Reference

Osawaru Odighizuwa (/oʊˈdɪɡizuwɑː/ oh-DIG-ee-zoo-wah; born August 13, 1998) is an American professional football defensive tackle for the San Francisco 49ers of the National Football League (NFL). He played college football for the UCLA Bruins, earning first-team all-conference honors in the Pac-12. Odighizuwa was selected by the Dallas Cowboys in the third round of the 2021 NFL draft.

== Early life ==
Odighizuwa attended and played high school football at David Douglas High School. He was a two-time defensive player of the year and received PrepStar All-West honors as a senior. Odighizuwa was a three star recruit coming out of high school and committed to play college at the University of California, Los Angeles on May 5, 2015.

Odighizuwa lettered in wrestling, winning three straight state heavyweight championships and going undefeated in his last two years (46–0 and 45–0). Following his junior year, Odighizuwa won the 2015 Fargo Junior Men's Freestyle National Championship at heavyweight. He also practiced track for one season.

== College career ==
As a redshirt freshman, Odighizuwa appeared in all 13 games as a backup defensive tackle. He collected 15 tackles, 5.5 tackles for loss (tied for fifth on the team), and a sack. Odighizuwa had three tackles and a sack against the University of Oregon. He returned a fumble for a 51-yard touchdown against the University of Washington. Odighizuwa recorded two tackles for loss and a sack against the University of Hawai'i.

As a sophomore, Odighizuwa appeared in 11 games, starting at defensive tackle in the final eight games. He registered 29 tackles, three sacks (tied for second on the team), six tackles for loss (tied for third on the team), and two pass deflections. Odighizuwa had five tackles against the University of Colorado and the University of Washington.

As a junior, Odighizuwa was named the starter at defensive tackle. He recorded 46 tackles (fifth on the team), 3.5 sacks (third on the team) and 10 tackles for loss (tied for the team lead). Odighizuwa had nine tackles against San Diego State University.

As a senior, the football season was reduced to 7 games due to the COVID-19 pandemic. Odighizuwa was a starter at defensive tackle, posting 30 tackles (sixth on the team), four sacks (second on the team), and six tackles for loss (third on the team). He had six tackles against the University of Colorado and Arizona State University. Odighizuwa made 2.5 tackles against the University of California. He received first-team All-Pac-12 honors. On December 22, 2020, Odighizuwa announced his intentions to enter the 2021 NFL draft.

== Professional career ==
Pre-draft measurables
Height	Weight	Arm length	Hand span	Wingspan	40-yard dash	10-yard split	20-yard shuttle	Three-cone drill	Vertical jump	Broad jump	Bench press
6 ft 1 5/8 in (1.87 m)	282 lb (128 kg)	34 1/8 in (0.87 m)	10 3/4 in (0.27 m)	7 ft 0 in (2.13 m)	5.00 s	1.74 s	4.44 s	7.57 s	31.5 in (0.80 m)	10 ft 0 in (3.05 m)	25 reps
All values from Pro Day

=== Dallas Cowboys ===
Odighizuwa was selected by the Dallas Cowboys in the third round (75th overall) of the 2021 NFL draft. He signed a four-year rookie contract on June 10, 2021.

Heading into his first training camp in the NFL, Odighizuwa was listed as a starting defensive tackle on the Cowboys' training camp depth chart alongside veteran Neville Gallimore. He faced competition from Trysten Hill and Chauncey Golston for his starting job. After the NFL preseason, head coach Mike McCarthy officially named Odighizuwa a starting defensive tackle.

Odighizuwa made his first career start and NFL debut in the narrow season-opening 31–29 road loss to the Tampa Bay Buccaneers. Odighizuwa was relatively quiet for the first two games of the season, but he had an excellent game in Week 3 against the Philadelphia Eagles. In that game, Odighizuwa recorded his first career sack on quarterback Jalen Hurts and posted 1.5 sacks, two solo tackles, and a tackle for loss during the 41–21 victory. Odighizuwa posted another 0.5 sacks, two more solo tackles, and another tackle for loss the following week in a 36–28 victory over the Carolina Panthers. Odighizuwa recorded his third straight tackle for loss in a Week 5 victory over the New York Giants. During a Week 9 30–16 loss to the Denver Broncos, Odighizuwa recorded his fourth career tackle for loss. During Week 13 against the New Orleans Saints, Odighizuwa recorded four solo tackles and two for a loss in the 27–17 road victory.

Odighizuwa finished his rookie year appearing in 16 games (12 starts) and recorded 21 solo tackles, six tackles for loss, 11 quarterback hits, and two sacks. He played in 57% of the Cowboys' defensive snaps during the season.

On March 4, 2025, Odighizuwa signed a four-year, $80 million contract extension with the Cowboys.

=== San Francisco 49ers ===
On March 12, 2026, the Cowboys traded Odighizuwa to the San Francisco 49ers in exchange for a 2026 third-round pick (No. 92: Jaishawn Barham).

== Career statistics ==
=== NFL ===
Legend
**Bold**	Career high

==== Regular season ====
Year	Team	Games		Tackles					Interceptions						Fumbles	
Year	Team	GP	GS	Cmb	Solo	Ast	Sck	TFL	Int	Yds	Avg	Lng	TD	PD	FF	FR
2021	DAL	16	12	36	21	15	2.0	6	0	0	0	0	0	0	0	0
2022	DAL	**17**	**17**	43	**27**	16	4.0	8	0	0	0	0	0	0	**1**	0
2023	DAL	**17**	**17**	46	26	20	3.0	**9**	0	0	0	0	0	0	0	0
2024	DAL	**17**	**17**	**47**	25	22	**4.5**	5	0	0	0	0	0	**1**	**1**	0
2025	DAL	17	13	44	16	**28**	3.5	6	0	0	0	0	0	0	0	0
2026	SF	9	9	21	8	13	2.0	5	0	0	0	0	0	1	0	0
Career		93	85	237	123	114	19.0	39	0	0	0	0	0	2	2	0

==== Postseason ====
Year	Team	Games		Tackles					Interceptions						Fumbles	
Year	Team	GP	GS	Cmb	Solo	Ast	Sck	TFL	Int	Yds	Avg	Lng	TD	PD	FF	FR
2021	DAL	1	0	5	**3**	2	0.0	0	0	0	0	0	0	0	0	0
2022	DAL	2	2	**7**	**3**	**4**	**1.0**	**2**	0	0	0	0	0	0	0	0
2023	DAL	1	1	2	0	2	0.0	0	0	0	0	0	0	0	0	0
Career		4	3	14	6	8	1.0	2	0	0	0	0	0	0	0	0

=== College ===
Legend
**Bold**	Career high

Season	Team	GP	Solo	Ast	Tot	Loss	Sk	Pd	FF	FR	TD
2017	UCLA	7	10	5	15	5.5	1.0	0	1	**1**	**1**
2018	UCLA	11	20	9	29	6.0	3.0	**2**	**1**	0	0
2019	UCLA	**12**	**25**	**21**	**46**	**10.0**	3.5	1	0	0	0
2020	UCLA	7	12	18	30	6.0	**4.0**	1	0	0	0
Total		37	67	53	120	6.9	11.5	4	2	1	1

== Personal life ==
Odighizuwa is of Nigerian descent. His older brother Owa Odighizuwa played as a defensive end in the NFL.

Odighizuwa's father, Peter, was the perpetrator of the 2002 Appalachian School of Law shooting, in which three were killed and three were wounded.
