= Do Jump =

Do Jump is a modern dance and trapeze company headquartered in Portland, Oregon, United States. Do Jump uses clowning, aerial dance, tumbling, partner acrobatics, physical theater, and minimal technical aspects to tell complex stories. Previous productions have included "Enthusiasmo," a show about the revolutionary village of Gaviotas, and "At Such A Dizzy Height," a creative interpretation of the life of painter Marc Chagall. Do Jump has operated under the artistic direction of Robin Lane since Do Jump's establishment in 1977. Since then, Do Jump has progressed from an ensemble of volunteers to a salaried troupe. Many of the company members also serve as teachers for Do Jump's Movement Theater School. They have performed on Broadway in New York City.

Various members of Do Jump performed in the film What the Bleep Do We Know!?, which was filmed in Portland and stars Marlee Matlin. Portions of What the Bleep Do We Know? were filmed at the Bagdad Theater in the Belmont District of Portland.

== See also ==
- The Jefferson Dancers
- Oregon Ballet Theater
