= 2002 Appalachian School of Law shooting =

Mass shooting in Grundy, Virginia

Coordinates: 37.27676°N 82.095038°W

- Location: Grundy, Virginia, U.S.
- Date: January 16, 2002; 24 years ago 1 p.m. (EST)
- Target: Faculty members and students at the Appalachian School of Law
- Attack type: Mass shooting, triple-murder, school shooting, mass murder
- Weapon: .380 ACP Jennings semi-automatic handgun
- Deaths: 3
- Injuries: 3
- Perpetrator: Peter Odighizuwa

On January 16, 2002, a school shooting occurred at the Appalachian School of Law, an American Bar Association accredited private law school in Grundy, Virginia, United States. Three people were killed, and three others were wounded when a former student, 43-year-old Peter Odighizuwa, opened fire in the school with a handgun.

== Shooting ==
On January 16, 2002, Peter Odighizuwa arrived on the Appalachian School of Law campus with a handgun. Odighizuwa first discussed his academic problems with professor Dale Rubin, where he reportedly told Rubin to pray for him. Odighizuwa returned to the school around 1 p.m. and proceeded to the offices of Dean Anthony Sutin and Professor Thomas Blackwell, where he opened fire with a .380 ACP semi-automatic handgun, killing both men by shooting them in the head. According to a county coroner, powder burns indicated that both victims were shot at point blank range. Also killed was student Angela Dales. Three students were wounded.

When Odighizuwa left the building where the shooting took place, he was approached by two students with personal firearms and one unarmed student. There are two versions of the events that transpired at that moment, one by Tracy Bridges and one by Ted Besen.

According to Bridges, at the first sound of gunfire, he and fellow student Mikael Gross, unbeknownst to each other, ran to their vehicles to retrieve their personally-owned firearms stored in their glove compartments. Mikael Gross, a police officer from Grifton, North Carolina, retrieved a 9 mm pistol and body armor. Bridges, a county sheriff's deputy from Asheville, North Carolina, retrieved his .357 Magnum pistol from beneath the driver's seat of his Chevrolet Tahoe. Bridges and Gross approached Odighizuwa from different angles, with Bridges yelling at Odighizuwa to drop his gun. Odighizuwa then dropped his firearm and was subdued by several other unarmed students, including Ted Besen, Daniel Boyd, and Todd Ross.

According to Besen, before Odighizuwa saw Bridges and Gross with their weapons, Odighizuwa set down his gun and raised his arms like he was mocking people. Besen, a Marine veteran and former police officer in Wilmington, North Carolina, engaged in a physical confrontation with Odighizuwa, and knocked him to the ground. Bridges and Gross then arrived with their guns once Odighizuwa was tackled. Additional witnesses at the scene stated they did not see Bridges or Gross with their guns at the time Besen started subduing Odighizuwa. Once Odighizuwa was securely held down, Gross went back to his vehicle and retrieved handcuffs to detain Odighizuwa until police could arrive.

Police reports later noted that two empty eight round magazines designed for Odighizuwa's handgun were recovered. Most sources (including those quoting Virginia State Police spokesman Mike Stater) state that when Odighizuwa dropped the gun the magazine was empty. A report by another witness's hometown newspaper, a month after the shooting, suggested that the gun still held three cartridges.

== Perpetrator ==
Peter Odighizuwa was a former law student at the Appalachian School of Law. Odighizuwa was born in Nigeria and was a naturalized U.S. citizen. Initially in 2002, Odighizuwa was found to be incompetent to stand trial and was referred for psychiatric treatment. After three years of treatment and monitoring, in 2005, Odighizuwa was found mentally competent and pleaded guilty to the murders to avoid the death penalty. Odighizuwa received six life sentences and an additional 28 years without the possibility of parole. He is currently serving his sentence at Red Onion State Prison in Wise County, Virginia.

Odighizuwa's oldest son, Owa, would go on to play in the National Football League (NFL) as a third round pick in the 2015 NFL draft by the New York Giants. His youngest son, Osa, was also selected in the third round, being picked in the 2021 NFL draft by the Dallas Cowboys.

== Memorials ==
After the shooting, students at the law school planted trees in memory of Sutin, Blackwell, and Dales on the school's front lawn. The school's student services office and scholarship program were named for Dales, along with County Highway 624 in Buchanan County, Virginia. Faculty fellowships at the school were named for Sutin and Blackwell. The school's Phi Alpha Delta chapter is named for Sutin while the Phi Delta Phi chapter is named for Blackwell.

The Legal Writing Institute and the Association of Legal Writing Directors created the Thomas Blackwell Memorial Award that is presented annually to a person who has made an outstanding contribution to improve the field of legal writing by demonstrating: (1) an ability to nurture and motivate students to excellence; (2) a willingness to help other legal writing educators improve their teaching skills or their legal writing programs; and (3) an ability to create and integrate new ideas for teaching and motivating legal writing educators and students.

== See also ==
- List of school shootings in the United States by death toll
