= Mt Scott Learning Center =

Coordinates: 45.4900°N 122.5995°W

Mount Scott Alternative High School is an alternative high school in Portland, Oregon. It is designed to provide a semi-traditional learning environment for high school students with the added benefit of small classes and supportive adults. The school enrolls 160 students with an average teacher-to-student ratio of 1 to 15. Thematic, integrated courses are offered in languages, arts, math, social studies, science, health and P.E., plus a variety of electives. Students participate in service learning activities, as well as outdoor educational experiences. The school is located in the former Laurelwood United Methodist Church, near the corner of Foster and Holgate in south-east Portland.
