= Oregon College of Oriental Medicine =

University in Oregon, United States

- Motto: The science of medicine, the art of healing.
- Type: Private acupuncture and Oriental medicine university
- Established: 1983
- President: Phil Lundberg
- Faculty: 45
- Students: 204
- Postgraduates: 182
- Doctoral students: 22
- Location: Portland, Oregon, United States
- Mascot: MOCO panda
- Website: www.ocom.edu/

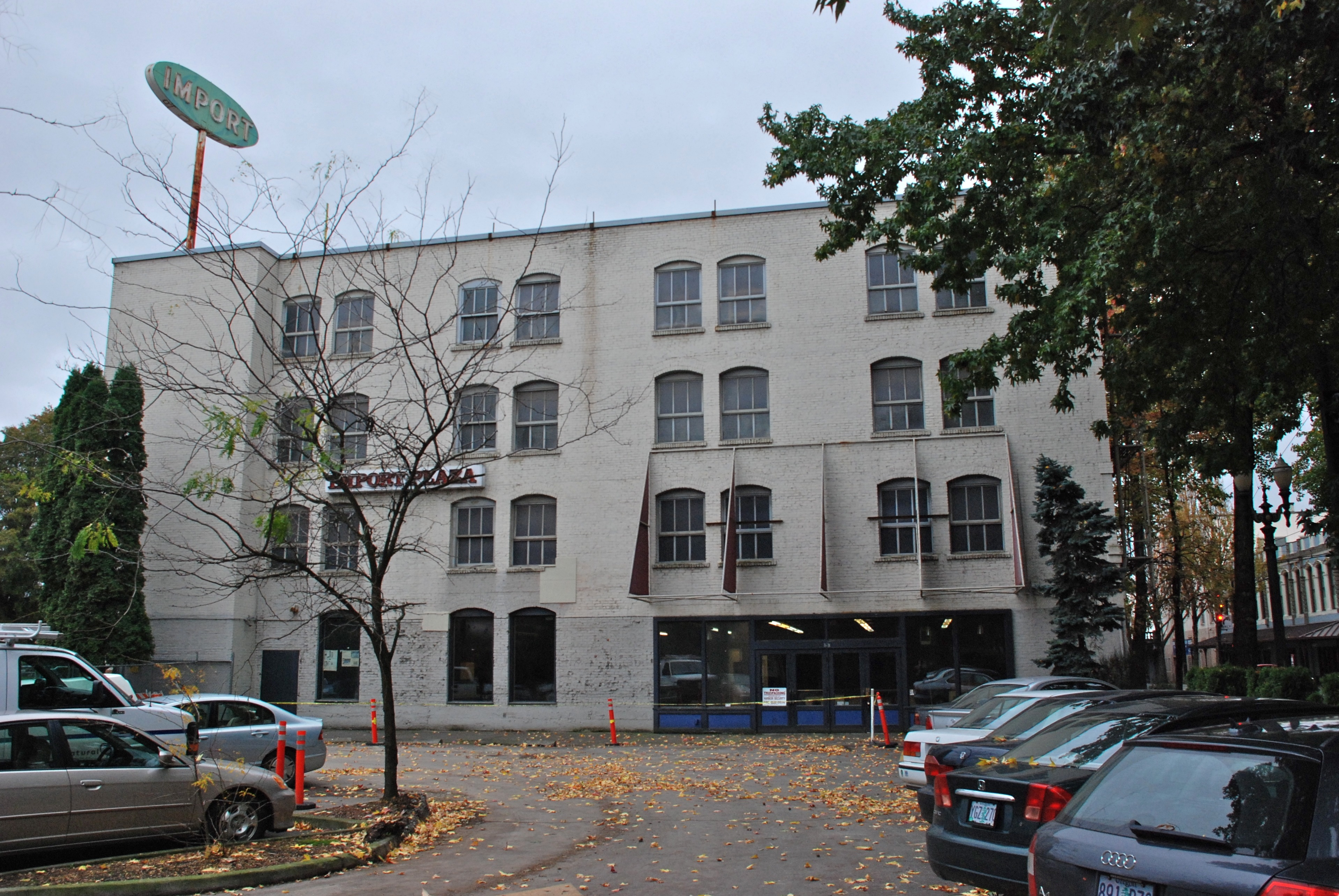
The building that became OCOM's new location in fall 2012, seen in 2010, before the start of renovation

The Oregon College of Oriental Medicine (OCOM) was a private university in Portland, Oregon focused on graduate degrees in acupuncture and Oriental medicine. OCOM's programs were accredited by the Accreditation Commission for Acupuncture and Herbal Medicine and authorized by the Oregon Student Assistance Commission's Office of Degree Authorization to award Master of Acupuncture and Oriental Medicine and Doctor of Acupuncture and Oriental Medicine degrees. The institution's trustees voted in spring 2024 to close the institution because of declining enrollments and financial challenges.

== History ==
Oregon College of Oriental Medicine was founded in Portland, Oregon in 1983, and is one of the oldest Chinese medicine colleges in the United States. OCOM trains master's and doctoral students, conducts research and treats patients at its Old Town Chinatown campus (OCOM Clinic). In July 2005, OCOM became the first college to graduate a cohort of Doctors of Acupuncture and Oriental Medicine. The institution announced plans in July 2009, to move from Portland's eastside to a historic building in downtown's Old Town Chinatown district. The new LEED Gold certified facility was renovated at a cost of $15.2 million. In September 2012, the school moved into its new home in Portland's historic Old Town Chinatown neighborhood.

In 2024, the institution's trustees voted to close the institution. They cited declining enrollments and financial challenges, including decreasing property values for their real estate, as the primary reasons for the closure. Teach out plans were established with other institutions, subject to approval by relevant regulatory bodies.

== Clinics ==
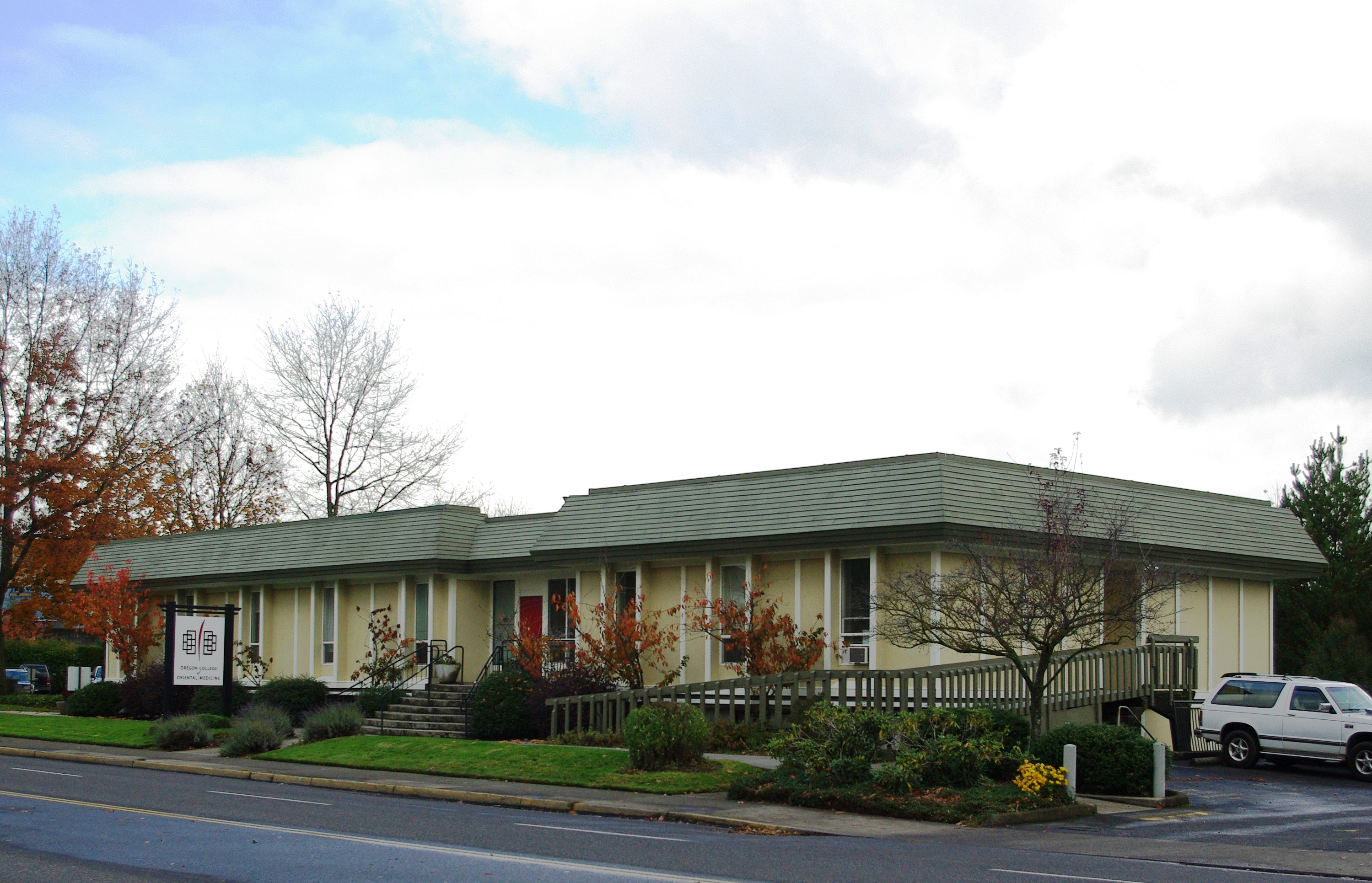
Building on the Southeast Portland campus

OCOM operated one clinic and an herbal medicinary at their location in Old Town. OCOM Clinic, at the institution's Old Town Chinatown campus, opened in September 2012 and served downtown residents and workers. The OCOM Herbal Medicinary was located on the ground floor of the institution's campus. More than 20,000 low-cost acupuncture, Chinese herbal medicine, tuina, and shiatsu patient treatments were offered annually by the clinics, which also served as teaching facilities for the institution. OCOM has an active research department, and has received substantial research grants from the National Institutes of Health/NCCAM. OCOM research projects have included a collaborative grant with the University of Arizona to study temporomandibular joint disorder.

Previous clinic locations included the OCOM Cherry Blossom Clinic and the OCOM Hollywood Clinic. The OCOM Hollywood Clinic, with eight clinic rooms, served residents of northeast Portland, including the neighborhoods of Hollywood, Grant Park, Irvington and Beaumont-Wilshire, and closed in December 2023.
