= Pacific Crest Community School =

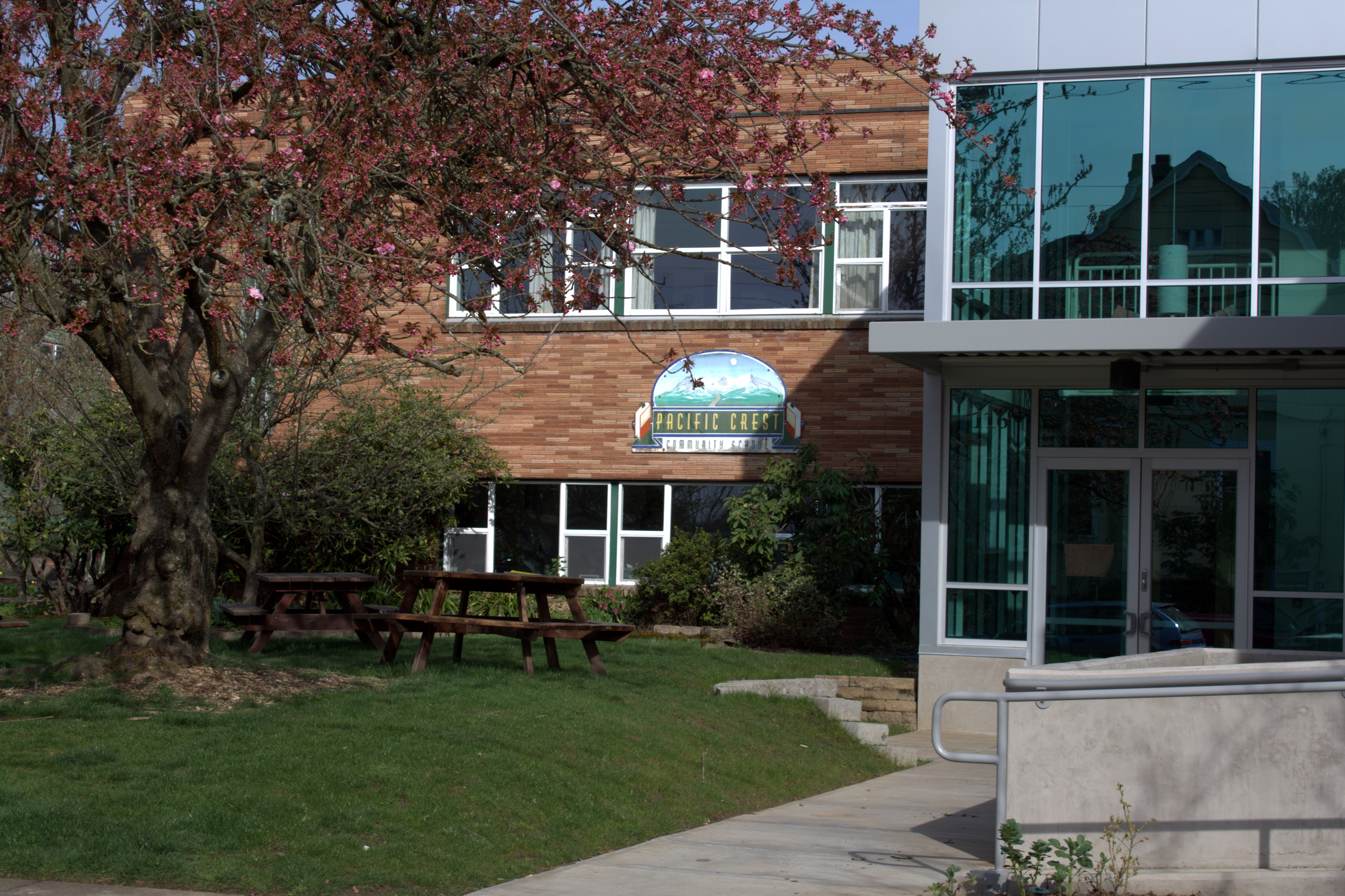

Location
- 116 NE 29th Avenue; Portland, Multnomah County, Oregon 97232; United States; 45.524075°N 122.635474°W

Information
- Type: Private
- Opened: 1993
- Principal: Jenny Osborne
- Grades: 6-12
- Enrollment: 95
- Colors: Purple and green
- Mascot: Goat
- Accreditation: NAAS
- Website: pcrest.org

Pacific Crest Community School is a private alternative school in Portland, Oregon, United States.

The school has been accredited by the Northwest Accreditation Commission (formerly the Association of Accredited Schools) since 1995.

The school was founded by four teachers from West Linn High School, who decided that there had to be a better way to educate kids.

The inspiration for the school came one day in 1990 when co-founders Dan Calzaretta and Becky Lukens (then both social studies teachers at West Linn High School) were having lunch. They both agreed that too many kids were not being served by the traditional educational system. The idea for Pacific Crest was thus born.

Becky's student teacher, Jenny Osborne, was also intrigued by the idea, and is also one of the co-founders of Pacific Crest. Robert Schlichting, then a science teacher at West Linn was also interested, and eventually joined as a co-founder, as did Bill Ballas, a friend of Dan's who was teaching in Japan at the time.
