= David Douglas High School =

Location
- 1001 SE 135th Ave. Portland, (Multnomah County), Oregon 97233; United States; 45.515681°N 122.527229°W

Information
- Type: Public
- Motto: "A place where connections are made"
- Opened: 1954
- School district: David Douglas School District
- Principal: Jen Buscher
- Teaching staff: 138.39 (FTE)
- Grades: 9–12
- Enrollment: 2,756 (2024–2025)
- Student to teacher ratio: 19.91
- Colors: Scarlet and gray
- Athletics conference: OSAA Mt. Hood Conference 6A-4
- Mascot: Scotty
- Rival: Reynolds High School
- Newspaper: The Highlander
- Feeder schools: Alice Ott Middle School; Floyd Light Middle School; Ron Russell Middle School
- Website: hs.ddouglas.k12.or.us
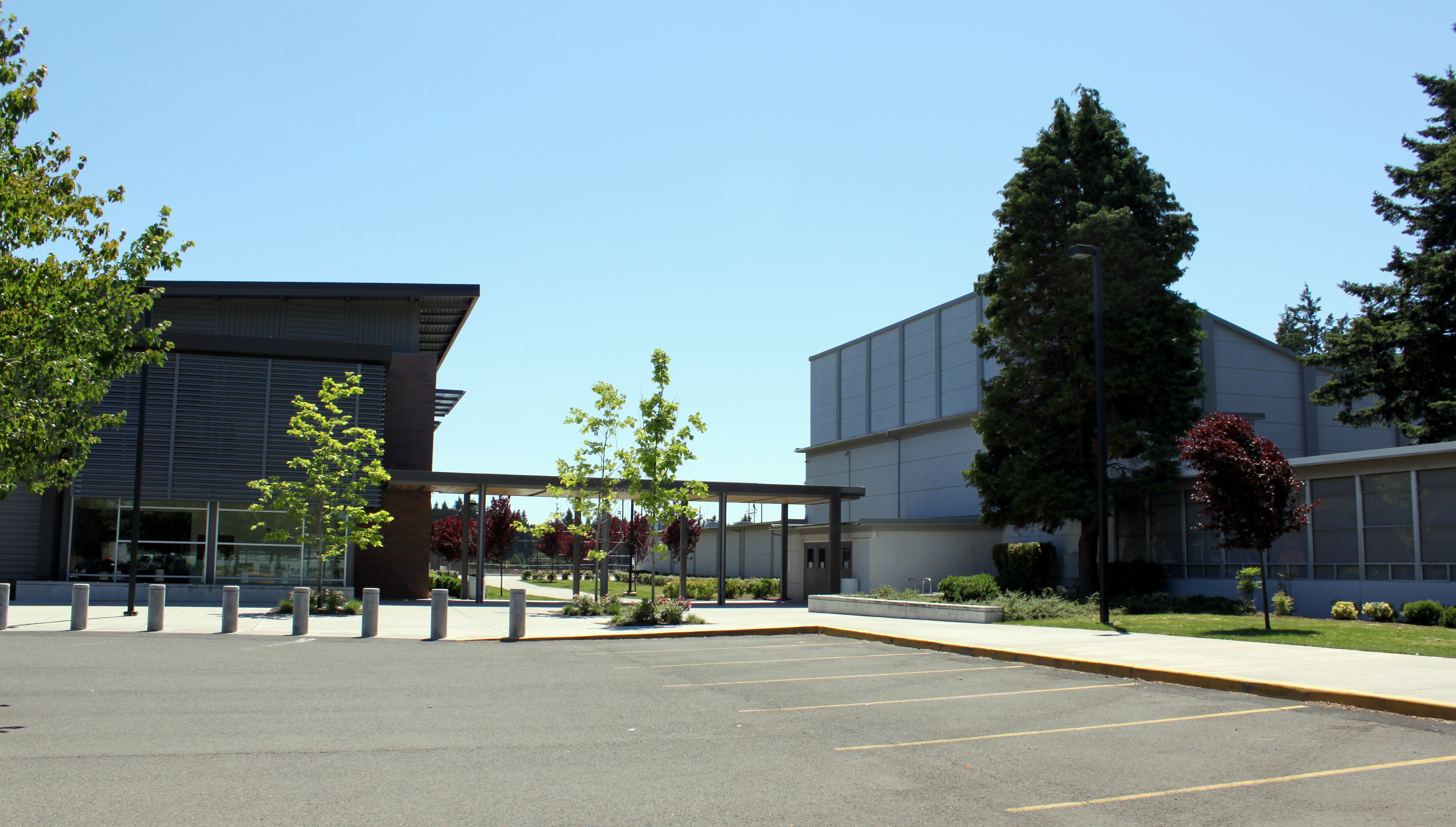

David Douglas High School (DDHS) is a public high school in Portland, Oregon, United States. It is the only high school in the David Douglas School District.

== History ==
The school is named after 19th-century Scottish botanist David Douglas, namesake of such Pacific Northwest species as the Douglas fir. Originally established in 1954, enrollment at DDHS increased quickly in subsequent years as development in suburban Portland expanded, eventually becoming one of the largest high schools in the area.

In 1998 Lynn Olson, author of The School-to-work Revolution: How Employers And Educators Are Joining Forces To Prepare Tomorrow's Skilled Workforce, said that David Douglas was "a clean, orderly, comfortable school, the kind that sprouted up all over the country in the baby boom years of the 1950s and 1960s."

In 2009 around 20 students at David Douglas, all a part of the East Precinct Youth Advisory Council, created a traffic enforcement mission at the campus in cooperation with the Portland Police Department east precinct.

== Academics ==
In 2008, 67% of the school's seniors received a high school diploma. Of 748 students, 500 graduated, 141 dropped out, 19 received a modified diploma, and 88 were still in high school the following year.

In 1991, the school district introduced the Project STARS (Students Taking Authentic Routes to Success) "school-to-work" program after a survey concluded that, of the recent graduates of the school, 20% went on to four-year colleges. Anthony Palermini, the superintendent, said, "We were doing an excellent job of providing a well-rounded college prep education. But it wasn't relevant to 25 to 30 percent of our students." The program introduced students to various career fields. The Oregon Business Council, an organization representing forty chief executive officers from the largest companies in the state, partnered with the David Douglas district in implementing the program.

In high school, students selected one of six 'constellations' for their elective concentrations. Each constellation requires a student to take a capstone course, related courses, job shadows, and work experience. The Oregon Business Council implemented committees, together with 12 members, to develop a business and administration certificate of advanced mastery and a production and technology certification of advanced mastery. In the fall of 1994 the district planned to begin offering courses in these areas, and planned to add four more certificates in the 1995–1996 school year.

In 1994 the Associated Press referred to the David Douglas School District as "a leader in Oregon's movement toward more career-oriented schools" due to the school-to-work program courses. The AP added that "It may serve as a model for other districts as they forge new ties with the world of work."

== Demographics ==
As of 2019, the school had 2,729 students. 716 9th grade students, 736 10th grade students, 660 11th grade students and 617 12th grade students. Of the 2,729 students 25.9% were Hispanic, .6% Native American, 18.6% Asian, 11.8% Black, 2% Pacific Islander, 34.7% White, and 6.3% Multi.

14% of students were on a reduced lunch program, and 55.5% were on a free lunch program totaling 69.5%.

== Performing arts ==
David Douglas High School’s music programs have been recognized nationally, receiving the Grammy Awards Signature Schools Award and being named one of the Best Communities for Music Education by NAMM 13 times.

In 2025, the director of the theatre department, Michael Givler, was named Oregon Theater Teacher of the Year.

== The Highlander ==
The Highlander, the school's newspaper, is published monthly by the Advanced Journalism class, and is printed by the Gresham Outlook. It has won the following awards:

- Northwest Scholastic Press, First Place, 1994–2000, 2002–2005, 2008

== Awards and honors ==
In 1996, David Douglas was honored as one of the ten original New American High Schools "showcase sites", serving as a model for other public schools around the nation, due in part to the David Douglas Model District Partnership and the "academic constellations" created through Project STARS (Students Taking Authentic Routes to Success).

== Sports ==
=== State championships ===
- Dance team: 1983, 1995, 1997, 2000
- Cheerleading: 2015, 2016, 2019

== Notable alumni ==
  - Bruce Abbott, Actor
  - Michelle Clunie, Actress
  - Samson Ebukam, NFL player
  - Sam Elliott, Actor
  - Dennis Gassner, Set designer
  - John Jaha, Baseball player
  - Dana Libonati, Musician
  - Jeff Merkley, Senator
  - Gary W. Martini, Marine
  - Barbara Niven, Actress
  - Osa Odighizuwa, NFL player
  - Owamagbe Odighizuwa, NFL player
  - Kim M. Peyton-McDonald, Olympic gold medal swimmer
  - Pete Pierson, NFL player
  - Lindsay Wagner, Actress
  - Claxton Welch, NFL player
  - Juston Wood, professional football player
  - Tonya Harding, Olympic Figure Skater
