= Columbia Christian Schools =

Private school in Portland, Oregon, United States

Columbia Christian School
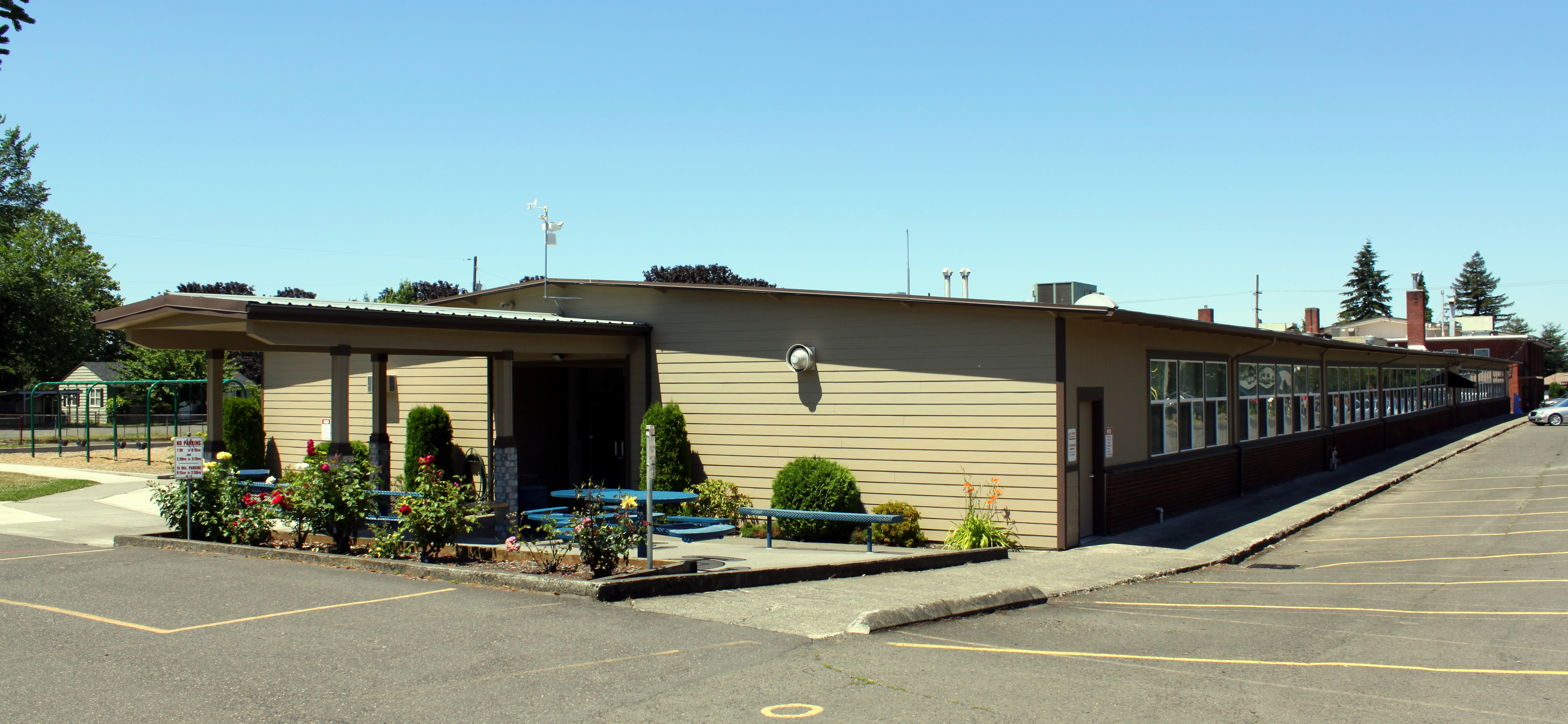

Location
- 413 NE 91st Avenue; Portland, Multnomah County, Oregon 97220; United States; 45.525896°N 122.570523°W

Information
- Type: Private
- Religious affiliation: Churches of Christ
- Opened: 1947
- President: Ami Vensel
- Grades: Pre-12
- Enrollment: 250
- Campus: Urban
- Colors: Black, gold and white
- Athletics conference: OSAA The Northwest League 1A
- Mascot: Knights
- Accreditation: ASCI, NAAS
- Website: columbiachristian.com

Columbia Christian Schools, known as Columbia Christian or CCS, is a private Christian school in Portland, Oregon, United States. The school is affiliated with the Churches of Christ.

== History ==
In September 1947, Columbia Christian School, known as Columbia Bible School, opened its doors for the first time using the Church of Christ building at Seventh and Hassalo Streets in Portland, Oregon. The school began with four teachers and thirty-six students in grades one through eight. From the beginning, chapel and daily Bible classes were an important part of the curriculum.

In 1949, the school obtained eight acres between 90th and 91st Streets, bordered on the north and south by Glisan and Burnside. Construction of the school building began in 1953 and was completed in 1954. This allowed the school to expand, adding a full high school. Through the remaining years of the 50s and the following decades the school continued to grow and experience progress with increased enrollment and stable leadership. A four-year college grew out of the early beginnings of the school and the academy and college were chartered and incorporated together.

In fall 1992, Columbia Christian School became independent and incorporated and appointed its own Board of Directors. The school continued to grow, and in the fall of 2000 dual accreditation was awarded to grades K-12 by Northwest Association of Accredited Schools and Association of Christian Schools International.

In summer 2009, Columbia Christian School began the Walk of Faith campaign to purchase the college campus located directly to the south of the academy. In June 2012, Columbia was able to purchase the 12-acre campus, significantly expanding its facilities and potential for continued growth.

Columbia Christian School's senior capstone class received several awards and recognition in the spring of 2014. Two groups competed in the local Project Citizen competition, and took the top two spots. The first place group had its work featured at a national showcase at the Center for Civic Education in Calabasas, California. The group that took second place was honored by the City of Portland with the Public Safety Project Award.

In fall 2014, Columbia Christian School expanding its early childhood education program, adding a preschool class (for 3-year-olds), while continuing to provide a pre-kindergarten class (for 4-year-olds). At the same time, sixth grade was incorporated into a new middle school, joining seventh and eighth grades (previously in junior high).

By fall of 2018 the preschool and pre-kindergarten classes had been merged into one half-day program for 3-year-olds and 4-year-olds. In the fall of 2026, sixth grade changed to become "upper elementary" and is seen as a transition year from elementary to middle school. While they remain in the elementary building, they also join middle school for math classes and chapel.

== Academics ==
In 1991, the school received accreditation from Association of Christian Schools International, and in 1999 received accreditation from the Northwest Association of Accredited Schools.

Columbia Christian School maintains an International Student Program and is authorized to issue I-20 forms to qualifying international students for F-1 student visas. Columbia has welcomed students from countries such as: South Korea, Japan, Vietnam, Brazil, Germany, China, Thailand, and many others.

== Athletics ==
Columbia Christian offers basketball, cross country, soccer, track and field, and volleyball.

During the 2009–2010 season, the Columbia boys basketball team earned the state championship 1A title.

During the 2013–2014 season, the Columbia boys basketball team earned the state championship 1A title again.

The most notable alumni from Columbia Christian was Kameron Chatman who was ranked at the top of the 2014 class. He later went on to play at Michigan University.

During the 2017–2018 season, the Columbia boys basketball team earned the state championship 2A title.

== Campus Expansion ==
Prompted by the closure of Cascade College in spring 2009, Columbia's administrators began a campaign to raise funds to purchase the former college campus, immediately adjacent to the academy. Entitled the "Walk of Faith", the key fundraising campaign was based on the idea of alumni and friends of the school purchasing bricks that are engraved and placed in a walkway leading from the existing campus to the former administration building at Cascade College.

In June 2012, Columbia Christian acquired the college campus. The school has since moved high school and middle school classes to the campus addition as well as opened a Student Center and Cafe' in the former student union. School enrollment continues to increase with the addition of the new facilities, and approaches 300 students.

== See also ==
- List of high schools in Oregon
