= Jefferson High School (Portland, Oregon) =

Public school in Portland, Oregon, United States

Thomas Jefferson High School
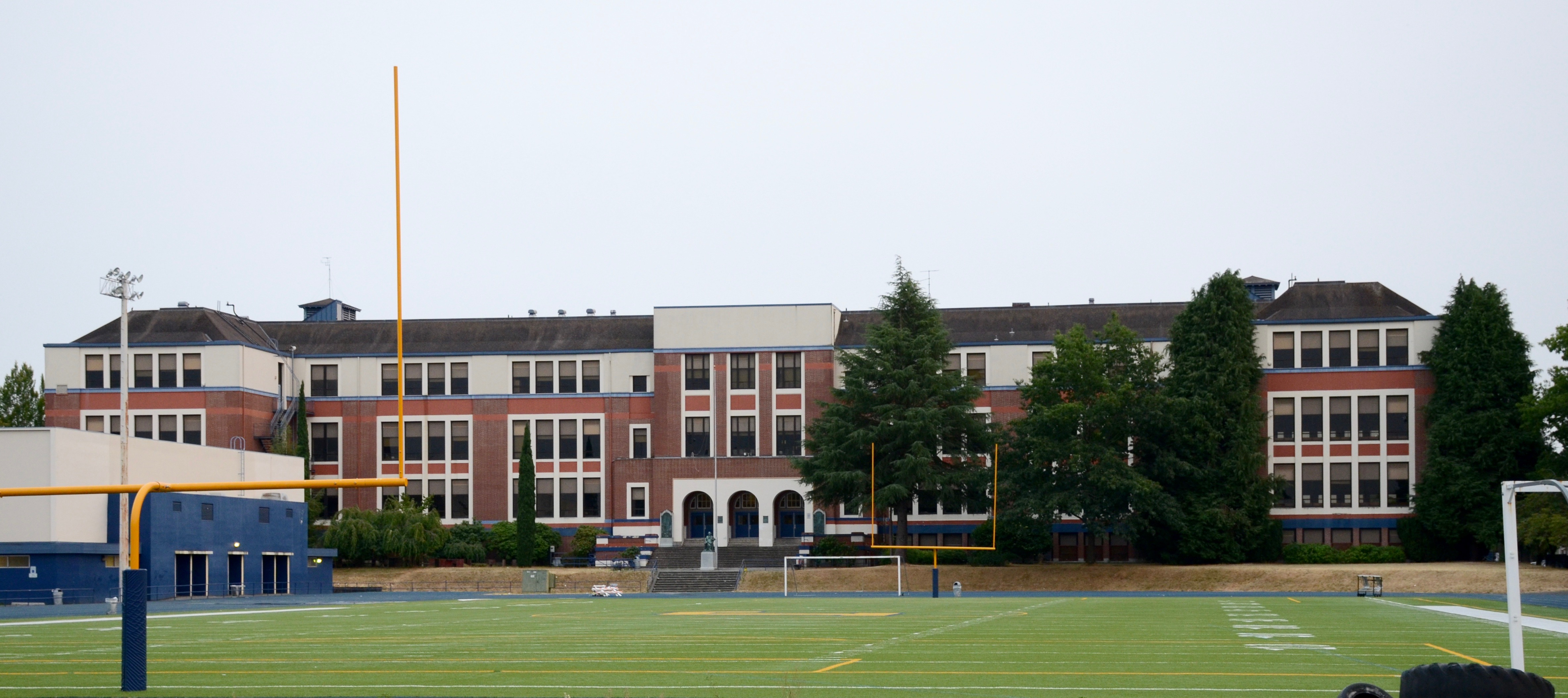
- Viewed from the north in 2017

Location
- 5210 N. Kerby Avenue; Portland, (Multnomah County), Oregon 97215; United States; 45.5604°N 122.6721°W

Information
- Type: Public
- Opened: 1908
- School district: Portland Public Schools
- Principal: Drake Shelton
- Teaching staff: 34.75 (FTE)
- Grades: 9–12
- Enrollment: 456 (2024–2025)
- Student to teacher ratio: 13.12
- Colors: Blue and gold
- Athletics conference: OSAA Portland Interscholastic League 6A-1
- Mascot: Democrats
- Rival: Benson High School
- Newspaper: The Pace
- Website: jefferson.pps.net

Jefferson High School (JHS, formally Thomas Jefferson High School) is a public high school in Portland, Oregon, United States.

The school itself is a Middle College Program, having converted from being a comprehensive high school in 2011. Students enrolled at the school take classes at both it and the Cascade campus of Portland Community College, located across the street from the program. Eighth graders at Faubion, Harriet Tubman, Ockley Green, or Vernon middle schools are given the choice between it or their neighborhood high school (which is Grant, McDaniel, or Roosevelt high schools). Students living out of these boundaries can also attend, but within a lottery based application process.

Ninth graders given the enrollment choice are guaranteed to attend Jefferson. In eleventh grade, all students need to be evaluated by the principal.

== History ==
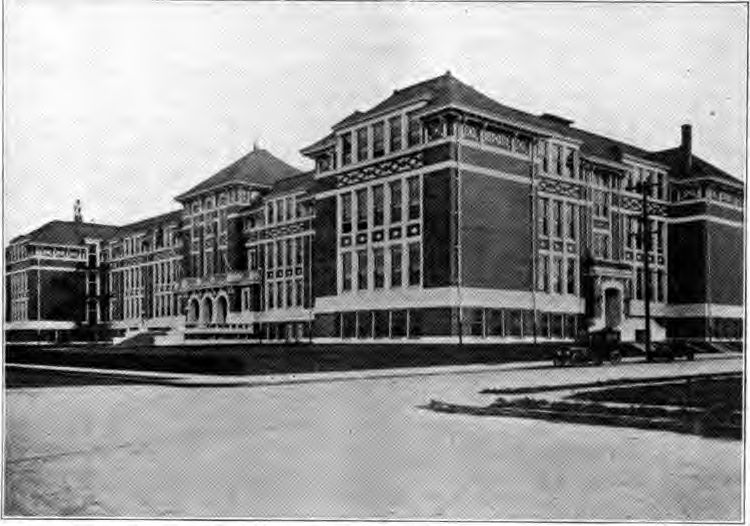
Photo from circa the 1910s

Jefferson opened in September 1908, and was initially named Albina High School, but was renamed Jefferson High School in early 1909. The school was not ready in 1908, but was opened early due to overcrowding. It was finished on February 6, 1910. The Oregonian reported in January 1922 that Jefferson was the largest high school in Portland, with 2,063 students. Hopkin Jenkins was principal at Jefferson from its opening until June 1940.

Due to the baby boom and passing of a $25 million building levy by the school district in 1947, a new high school was slated.

In September 1991, "at least six fires" were set at the school by an arsonist.

On January 7, 2008, Mayor Potter relocated City Hall to Jefferson for a week. Potter held a City Council meeting and delivered the State of the City address there. The aim was stated to be to "give students, parents and educators a first hand lesson in how government really works - and to showcase the opportunities, successes and challenges facing every school in Portland's six public school districts."

== School profile ==
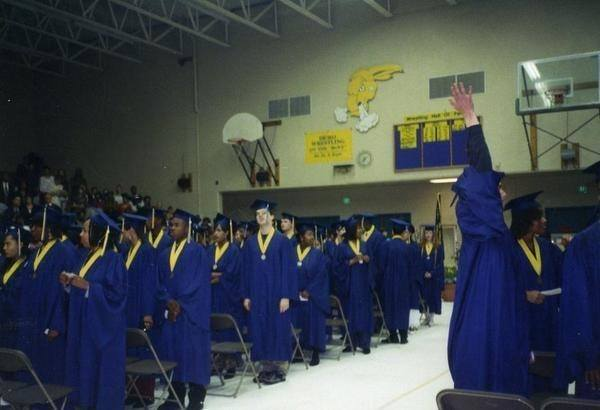
Jefferson High School graduation demonstrates an ethnic diversity which is rare for Portland, which has been referred to as "the whitest major city" in the United States.

In 2009–10, Jefferson was the only school in Oregon to have a majority of African American students. As of 2018, the school's ethnic demographics were 41% African American, 28% European American, 17% Hispanic, 10% Two or more races, 2% Asian, 2% Hawaiian, and 1% American Indian.

In 2018, 84% of the school's seniors received a high school diploma, higher than the state average of 80%.

In September 2011, all freshman students were required to participate in the Middle College for Advanced Studies. This program was explained as follows:

Freshmen and sophomores focus on their core subjects at Jefferson. They learn skills such as study habits and organization to prepare them for college coursework and move through classes in groups — or academies - with the same set of teachers.

As students are ready, they move to college prep classes at Jefferson and college courses at Portland Community College Cascade Campus, mostly in their junior and senior years. College pathways range from preparation for a four-year college to careers such as emergency medical technician, medical assistant, firefighter, and heating, ventilation and cooling technician.

College coursework is offered at no cost to Jefferson students. Students who receive special education services may participate in the Middle College as recommended by their individualized education plan teams.

Students who are learning English may participate in the Middle College by taking credit-bearing ESOL courses and other courses consistent with their English language level.

Counselors and advisers at Portland Community College and Jefferson closely support students as they progress. Self Enhancement, Inc., a youth-development nonprofit, provides core support services as tutoring and mentoring to all Jefferson students.

Students earn high school diplomas from Jefferson as well as 12 to 45 college credits from Portland Community College that are transferable to other colleges and universities.

=== Dance program ===
In the mid-1970s, in an attempt to integrate the student body, Jefferson High School introduced the magnet arts program and the dance program to attract students from other Portland high school attendance areas. The dance program was founded by Mary Vinton Folberg, sister of Will Vinton (creator of Claymation). Folberg modelled the Jefferson Dance Department after the Fiorello H. LaGuardia High School of Music & Art and Performing Arts. While the magnet arts and dance program attracted some white students from other school attendance areas, some argue that this has not led to integrating the student body, and that only a small percentage of black students in this traditionally black school are able to enroll in the dance and arts programs.

The Jefferson dance program teaches different levels of a broad range of dance styles, including ballet, tap, African, modern, hip hop and jazz. Twice each school year the students' achievements are publicly showcased in recitals in the school's auditorium: one in the winter and one in the spring. Considered a foundation of many types of dance, ballet is an essential part of many dance students' educations. However, the Jefferson dance program and school-based company, the Jefferson Dancers, lacked advanced ballet training for about a decade. In the 2009 winter recital, the Jefferson Dancers performed the school's first piece en pointe in about ten years.

=== The Jefferson Dancers ===
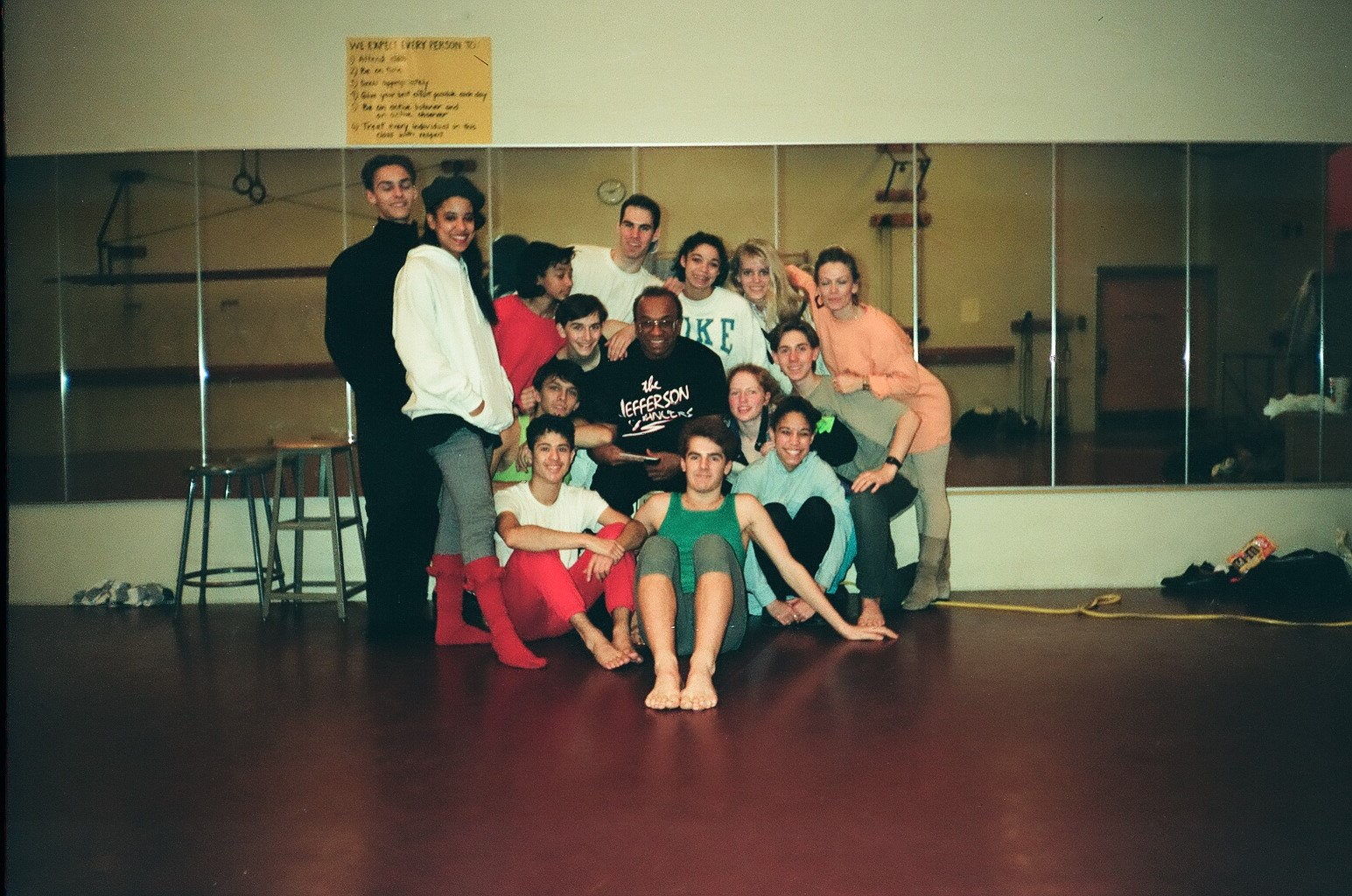
World-famous choreographer Donald McKayle (seated, center) posed with members of the Jefferson Dancers, in 1992, after a week-long rehearsal in which he taught the company two of his signature dances: "Games" and "Rainbow 'Round My Shoulder"

In the late 1970s, Folberg founded the student dance company The Jefferson Dancers. Since its founding, the company has grown and changed, exposing its members to a diverse range of dance styles, including ballet, modern, African, tap, jazz and hip hop. The company's dance instructors are highly qualified and have led successful dance careers. Some instructors have continued to perform during their involvement with the Jefferson Dancers. Promising company members are awarded scholarships at each spring recital, and company auditions are held for two days each spring.

The company performs twice annually at Jefferson High School's winter and spring dance recitals, as well as throughout Portland, Oregon, and the world. The company toured in Germany in April 2009, Italy in March 2011, and China in 2013.

== Athletics ==
The Jeff High Democrat

=== Men's basketball ===
The men's basketball team has been one of the most successful programs in Oregon. Jefferson has produced 40 plus D1 basketball recruits in program history. Some previous democrat recruits have chosen to play at Washington, Texas, Gonzaga, Kentucky, Oregon, USC, Kansas, Michigan, and other schools. Six former players have been ranked in the top 100 in the country and Terrence Jones was named a McDonald's All American in 2010. Jefferson has won state titles in 1951, 1972, 2000, 2008, 2009, 2010, 2013, 2014, and 2017. Pat Strickland was head coach from 2009–2021, then stepped down for a year and announced he will be returning for the 2022–2023 season.

=== Football ===
The back-to-back state champion football teams of 1931 and 1932, were undefeated going a combined 20-0-1.

=== State championships ===
- Boys' basketball: 1951, 1972, 2000, 2008, 2009, 2010, 2013, 2014, 2017
- Girls' basketball: 2008, 2010
- Football: 1931, 1932, 1936, 1957, 1958
- Boys' swimming: 1951
- Girls' swimming: 1952, 1953
- Baseball: 1946, 1947, 1959
- Girls' tennis: 1951, 1953, 1954
- Boys' track & field: 1944, 1945, 1960, 1963
- Girls' track & field: 1984

== Notable alumni ==
- Terry Baker, football player, 1962 Heisman Trophy winner, Los Angeles Rams
- Emery Barnes, former NFL player and politician
- Larry Beil, football player
- Kameron Chatman, current professional basketball player. Played at Jefferson for his freshmen and sophomore years of HS
- Dick Daniels, NFL player and executive
- Johnny Ray Gill, actor
- Joe Gordon, Baseball Hall of Famer, second baseman, New York Yankees
- Woody Green, NFL player
- Kevin Hagen, actor
- Kamaka Hepa, professional basketball player
- Mickey Hergert, baseball coach at Lewis & Clark College
- Terrence Jones, basketball player
- Silas Melson, basketball player
- Aaron Miles (basketball), professional basketball player & assistant coach of the Boston Celtics
- Danny Mwanga, Major League Soccer player
- Virginia Patton, actress
- Mel Renfro, Pro Football Hall of Fame, Dallas Cowboys
- Terrence Ross, basketball player, Orlando Magic
- Nancy Ryles, state legislator
- Markhuri Sanders-Frison, basketball player
- Floyd Simmons, football player
- Ural Thomas, musician
- Ime Udoka, professional basketball player for the New York Knicks, Portland Trail Blazers, San Antonio Spurs. Former head coach of the Boston Celtics. Current head coach of the Houston Rockets
- Pete Ward, baseball player and coach
- Renée Watson, an award-winning and New York Times bestselling author of young adult novel Piecing Me Together
- Arnie Weinmeister, Professional Football Hall of Fame New York Yankees/New York Giants
- K'Zell Wesson, professional basketball player (played in Turkey, France, Germany)
- Joan Young, actress

== See also ==
- Thomas Jefferson (Bitter), a statue installed on the campus in 1915
