= David Douglas School District =

School district in Oregon, United States

Address
- 11300 Northeast Halsey St Portland, Oregon, 97220; United States
- Coordinates: 45°30′46.05″N 122°31′43.11″W

District information
- Type: Public
- Grades: PK–12
- Schools: 14
- NCES District ID: 4103940

Students and staff
- Students: 8,774 (2025–2026)
- Teachers: 477.44 (on an FTE basis) (2025–2026)
- Staff: 721.93 (on an FTE basis) (2025–2026)
- Student–teacher ratio: 18.38 (2025–2026)

Other information
- Website: www.ddouglas.k12.or.us

David Douglas School District No. 40 is a school district in eastern Portland, Oregon, United States. Its administrative offices are at 11300 NE Halsey St. Portland, OR 97220.

The district was formed in 1959 as a consolidation of the Gilbert, Powellhurst, and Russellville elementary school districts and the David Douglas Union High School District. As of 2012, it operates nine elementary schools, three middle schools and one high school with an alternative school campus. It serves more than 10,330 students from kindergarten through 12th grade.

== History ==
The district and High School are named after famed Scottish botanist David Douglas, for whom the Douglas Fir tree is named after as well.

In 1964 the school district had no significant tax base. Each year it relied on a voter-approved levy so the district could have funds to cover its operational expenses.

In 1984 the American Civil Liberties Union sued the school district regarding its plans to include prayers in the May 23, 1984, graduation ceremony. The students had created a compromise, but the school board rejected the compromise. During that year Robert P. Jones, the Multnomah County circuit judge, ruled that the David Douglas School District would not be able to include prayers in its high school graduation ceremony, because doing so would be a violation of the U.S. Constitution. Jones had orally stated so before the ceremony was held, but his written judgment came over one month after the ceremony. The Oregon Supreme Court unanimously ruled that the trial court should have dismissed the lawsuit because, after the ceremony ended, there was no immediate controversy and no party had sought action on future school ceremonies that may involve praying.

In 1990 Oregon state voters passed Measure 5, which was an initiative to reduce property taxes. 1993 the Oregon Legislature cut millions of dollars in education funding. To compensate, the district passed a $19.8 million bond, with 5,658 voters in favor and 3,798 voters opposed. The bond called for renovating a middle school, adding fifteen classrooms to elementary and middle schools, and add multipurpose rooms and new gymnasiums to elementary schools.

In 2004 the district's student population increased by over 300 students, making it an increase of over 4%.

Around 2008 Portland City Commissioner Erik Sten created a plan to transfer $19 million of educational funds for central Portland to David Douglas so that district could build a new elementary school. Rob Manning of Oregon Public Broadcasting said that "Commissioner Erik Sten’s idea is to create a direct connection between opposite ends of Portland, both geographically – and financially." In June 2008 the Portland City Council approved taking $19 million from the Downtown Portland River District urban renewal area to the David Douglas area to build an elementary school and community center. The Portland School Board expressed its opposition to the plan. Several former Portland Development Commission employees and members filed a lawsuit challenging the fund transfer. In 2009 the city government won the legal dispute.

In 2010, as the school district planned to reduce its $98 million budget by $7 million, it considered eliminating middle school sports teams traveling outside of the school district to compete against other schools, except those in track and field. The district also planned to end summer school for lower grades except for kindergarten, sixth grade, and ninth grade, as those three levels are years involving students transitioning.

== Demographics ==
As of September 2012 the district had 10,650 students. Of them, 75% participated in free or reduced lunch programs, and the participation rate reflects the poverty of students within a school district. Almost 25% of students were English language learners. The average size of a Kindergarten class was 33 students, and the average size of a high school physical education class was 50 students. In 2010 the district had over 4,700 elementary school students.

As of 2009 the school district had over 10,000 students. 70% of its students qualified for free or reduced lunches. As of that year almost all of the district schools were filled to capacity. The student population had increased by 35% in a 10-year period until 2009. In the 2009 school year, the district had 479 students classified as homeless by the Oregon Department of Education, or 4.5 percent of students in the district. In a ten-year period ending in 2007, the student population had increased by 36%. Many of the families who moved to David Douglas were low income students that were forced to move from outside of the district due to gentrification.

In 1964 the district was one of the largest school districts in the State of Oregon. In February 1986 the district had 6,000 students.

== Curriculum ==
As of 2010 David Douglas has an extensive music program, with 26 district employees teaching music. In the district each elementary school student takes music classes two to three times per week. A student may select an area of concentration in the fifth grade; it may be band, chorus, and/or orchestra. In 2010 1,800 fifth to twelfth graders took instrumental courses and slightly over 1,000 fifth to twelfth graders took choir. The district alumni include several professional musicians, several music students on university scholarships, and a graduate of the Juilliard School. In 2008 the National Association of Music Manufacturers (NAMM) gave recognition to David Douglas. In May 2010 NAMM ranked David Douglas one of 174 "Best Communities for Music Education."

In 1969 the district introduced the David Douglas Diagnostic Mathematics, 6th Grade testing plan (DDDM6) an 89-question computer-scored multiple choice test on the district IBM 1401 used to assess difficulties in mathematics in students.

=== Project STARS ===
In 1991 the school district introduced the Project STARS (Students Taking Authentic Routes to Success) "school-to-work" program after a survey concluded that, of the recent graduates of David Douglas High School, 20% went to four-year colleges. Anthony Palerimini, the superintendent, said "We were doing an excellent job of providing a well-rounded college prep education. But it wasn't relevant to 25 to 30 percent of our students." The program introduced students to various career fields. The Oregon Business Council, an organization representing forty chief executive officers from the largest companies in the State of Oregon, partnered with the David Douglas district in implementing the program.

In middle school students took career orientation classes. In high school each student selected one of six "constellations" (concentrations) in which he or she would concentrate his or her electives in. Each constellation requires a student to take a capstone course, related courses, job shadows, and work experience. The Oregon Business Council implemented committees, together with 12 members, to develop a business and administration certificate of advanced mastery and a production and technology certification of advanced mastery. In the northern hemisphere fall of 1994 the district planned to begin offering courses in these areas. The district planned to add four more certificates in the 1995-1996 school year.

In 1994 the Associated Press referred to the district as "a leader in Oregon's movement toward more career-oriented schools" due to the school-to-work program courses. The Associated Press added that "It may serve as a model for other districts as they forge new ties with the world of work."

== List of schools ==
=== Elementary schools (K-5) ===
- Cherry Park
- Earl Boyles
- Gilbert Heights
- Gilbert Park
- Lincoln Park
- Menlo Park
- Mill Park
- Ventura Park
- West Powellhurst

=== Middle schools (6-8) ===
- Alice Ott Middle School
- Floyd Light Middle School
- Ron Russell Middle School

=== High schools (9-12) ===
- David Douglas High School

== See also ==
- List of school districts in Oregon
- Multnomah Education Service District
