= 1942 in art =

Events from the year 1942 in art.

== Events ==
- January – Treasures from the new National Gallery of Art in Washington, D.C. are evacuated by train to the Biltmore Estate at Asheville, North Carolina.
- February 15 – Singapore surrenders to Japanese forces. Among the British troops captured are illustrator Ronald Searle and sculptor Anthony Twentyman.
- March 28–29 – Bombing of St. Mary's Church, Lübeck, destroys Adriaen Isenbrandt's Bröhmse triptych, Jacob van Utrecht's Trinity Altar, Friedrich Overbeck's Entrance of Christ into Jerusalem and Bernt Notke's Gregorsmesse and replica Totentanz, but reveals medieval frescos.
- May 8 – English novelist David Garnett marries painter and writer Angelica Bell, the daughter of painters Duncan Grant (Garnett's lover) and Vanessa Bell.
- July 27 – A large amount of "degenerate art" including works by Picasso, Dalí, Ernst, Klee, Léger and Miró is destroyed in a bonfire in the gardens of the Galerie nationale du Jeu de Paume in Nazi-occupied Paris.
- October – Michael Ayrton and John Minton exhibit together at the Leicester Galleries in London.
- October 14–November 7 – The "First Papers of Surrealism" exhibition, arranged by André Breton and Marcel Duchamp, is held at the Whitelaw Reid Mansion on Madison Avenue in New York City, including Duchamp's His Twine and Breton's Hanging.
- October 20 – The Art of This Century gallery is opened by Peggy Guggenheim at 30 West 57th Street in Manhattan, New York City.
- unknown dates
  - Salvador Dalí publishes his autobiography, The Secret Life of Salvador Dalí.
  - Horst Rosenthal, whilst in Gurs internment camp, produces Mickey au Camp de Gurs and two other comic books; on September 11 he is murdered on arrival at Auschwitz concentration camp.

== Awards ==
- Archibald Prize: William Dargie – Corporal Jim Gordon, VC

== Works ==
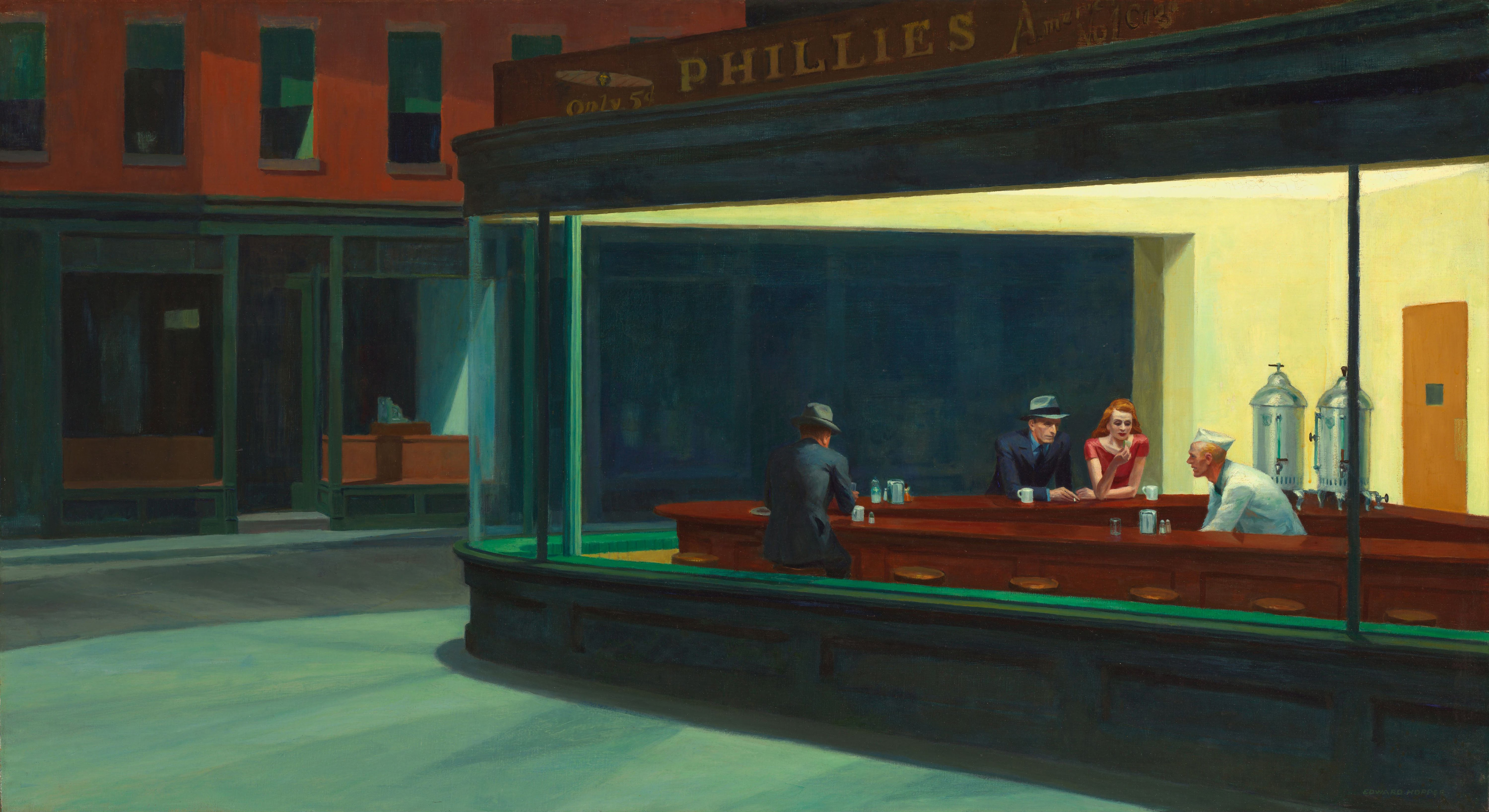
Edward Hopper – Nighthawks (Art Institute of Chicago)

- Rita Angus – Portrait (Betty Curnow)
- Thomas Hart Benton – Year of Peril (series)
- George Berry – Statue of Benjamin Franklin (sculpture, Franklin High School (Portland, Oregon))
- Pierre Bonnard – Red Roofs in Cannet
- Paul-Émile Borduas – Abstraction No 7
- Russell Drysdale – Soldier
- Richard Eurich
  - HMS Revenge Leaving Harbour
  - The Raid on the Bruneval Radio-location Station
- Marie Hadad – Portrait of Mr. Dahesh (Dahesh Museum of Art)
- Edward Hopper
  - Dawn in Pennsylvania
  - Nighthawks
- Dame Laura Knight – A Balloon Site, Coventry
- Helen Levitt - New York City (photograph)
- Jacques Lipchitz – Theseus (sculpture)
- L. S. Lowry
  - After the Blitz
  - Blitzed Site
- Roberto Matta
  - The Apples we Know
  - Composition in Magenta: The End of Everything
  - The Disasters of Mysticism
  - The Hanged Man
- Paul Nash – The Archer
- Frank Newbould – Your Britain, Fight for it Now (poster series)
- Sidney Nolan – Dream of the Latrine Sitter
- Méret Oppenheim – Sun, Moon, Stars
- Gordon Parks – American Gothic, Washington, D.C. (photograph)
- Pablo Picasso
  - Portrait of Dora Maar
  - Woman in a Fish Hat (Stedelijk Museum, Amsterdam)
- Diego Rivera – The Flower Seller
- Ruskin Spear – We Can Take It
- Dorothea Tanning – Birthday (Philadelphia Museum of Art)
- Carel Weight – Recruit's Progress – Medical Inspection
- Andrew Wyeth – Winter Fields
- Philip Zec – The price of petrol has been increased by one penny – Official (political cartoon)

== Births ==
- January 8 – George Passmore, English artist partnering with Gilbert (Proesch)
- February 2
  - Alonzo Davis, African American artist
  - Graham Nash, English-born rock singer-songwriter and photographer
- February 10 – Lawrence Weiner, American conceptual artist (d. 2021)
- February 28 – Oliviero Toscani, Italian photographer
- March 2 – Jonathan Borofsky, American painter, sculptor and installation artist
- March 16 – Danny Lyon, American documentary photographer
- March 20 – Peter Schjeldahl, American art critic (The New Yorker, The New York Times) (d.2022)
- March 31
  - Dan Graham, American conceptual and performance artist (d. 2021)
  - David Medalla, Filipino-born sculptor
- May 20 – Anna Maria Maiolino, Italian-born Brazilian artist
- May 29 – Charlotte Johnson Wahl, born Charlotte Fawcett, English painter (d. 2021)
- October 6 – Dan Christensen, American abstract painter (d.2007)
- October 29 – Bob Ross, American painter and television presenter (d.1995)
- November 7 – Stan Rice, American poet and artist (d.2002)
- December 1 – William Feaver, English art critic and historian
- date unknown
  - Susan Crile, American painter
  - De Es Schwertberger, born Dieter Schwertberger, Austrian painter

== Deaths ==
- January – Albert Moulton Foweraker, English painter (b. 1873)
- January 5 – Tina Modotti, Italian photographer and model (b. 1896)
- January 6 – John Bernard Flannagan, American sculptor (b. 1895) (suicide)
- January 22 – Walter Sickert, British Impressionist painter (b. 1860)
- January 23 – Bogdan Šuput, Serbian painter (b. 1914)
- January 27 – Petar Dobrović, Serbian painter (b. 1890)
- February 9 – Anna Elizabeth Klumpke, American portrait and genre painter (b. 1856)
- February 12 – Grant Wood, American painter (b. 1892)
- February 16 – Giovanni Bartolena, Italian painter (b. 1886)
- February 20 – Herbert Dicksee, English canine painter (b. 1862)
- April 18 - Adolphe Valette, French painter (b. 1876)
- April 18 – Gertrude Vanderbilt Whitney, founder of the Whitney Museum of American Art (b. 1875)
- May 23 – C. R. Ashbee, English designer (b. 1863)
- June 18 – Sutherland Macdonald, English tattoo artist (b. 1860)
- June 30 – William Henry Jackson, American photographer (b. 1843)
- August 10 – Albert Guillaume, French painter and caricaturist (b. 1873)
- August 30 – Sava Šumanović, Serbian painter (b. 1896)
- September 2 – Eric Ravilious, English painter (b. 1903) (lost on active service as a war artist)
- September 7
  - Cecilia Beaux, American portrait painter (b. 1855)
  - Albert Julius Olsson, English marine painter (b. 1864)
- November 24 – Bohumil Kafka, Czech sculptor (b. 1878)
- December 11 - Séraphine Louis, French painter (b. 1864)
- December 19 – T. F. Šimon, Czech painter (b. 1877)
- date unknown
  - Nampeyo, Hopi ceramicist (b. 1860)

== See also ==
- 1942 in fine arts of the Soviet Union
