= Mulry =

Mulry is a surname. Notable people with this surname include:

- Mary Morris (née Mulry, 1921–1997), Irish nurse and war diarist
- Joseph A. Mulry (1874–1921), American Jesuit priest, president of Fordham University
- Mary Mulry, American statistician
- Megan Mulry, novelist, winner of Bisexual Book Awards
- Pete Mulry, American baseball player for Tampa Spartans baseball
- Ted Mulry (1947–2001), English-born Australian musician
- Thomas Maurice Mulry (1855–1916), American businessman and philanthropist
- William P. Mulry, acting Commissioner of Public Markets in New York in 1919

== See also ==
- Mulry Square in New York City
