= Winter Fields =

Winter Fields may refer to:

- Winter Fields (album) by Marié Digby
- Winter Fields (painting), painting by Andrew Wyeth, 1942
- The Winter Fields, poem by Sir Charles G.D. Roberts
