= Melvin Storer =

U.S. Navy shipfitter (1921–2003)

- Storer in 1941
- Born: Melvin Tyler Storer; April 17, 1921; Portland, Oregon, U.S.
- Died: December 27, 2003 (aged 82); Chula Vista, California, U.S.
- Burial place: Glen Abbey Mortuary, Bonita, California, U.S.
- Alma mater: Franklin High School; Benson Polytechnic High School
- Spouse: Edith Dette Sherman (m. 1973)
- Military career
- Allegiance: United States
- Branch: United States Navy Reserve
- Service years: 1938–1945; 1948–
- Rank: Shipfitter first class; Deep-sea diver
- Nickname: Red
- Service number: 4143534
- Commands: USS West Virginia (BB-48); USS Yarnall (DD-541)
- Conflicts: World War II; Attack on Pearl Harbor
- Awards: Asiatic–Pacific Campaign Medal
- Other work: Welder at Rohr, Inc.

Melvin Tyler Storer (17 April 1921 – 27 December 2003) was an American shipfitter, navy diver and welder who served in the United States Navy Reserve on the USS West Virginia and USS Yarnall. He was aboard the USS California during the Attack on Pearl Harbor during World War II and was reported lost in action before being found as a survivor.

== World War II service ==
Storer joined the United States Navy Reserve on May 5, 1938. He was a shipfitter third class when enlisting on the USS California on July 16, 1940. In a plan to give active duty to more reservists, Storer was one of 11 men assigned to the first group from the sixth division.

Following his time at Pearl Harbor, Storer was later a shipfitter on the USS West Virginia and USS Yarnall, first enlisting on May 15, 1942. In 1943, he was promoted to shipfitter first class and deep-sea diver. Storer was discharged in October 1945 and briefly worked as a Naval Reserve recruiter before re-enlisting on March 30, 1948.

=== Pearl Harbor attack ===
Storer was supervising cleanup in the engine room on the USS California when an airstrike call came in. It was dismissed at first, due to previous drills. Storer and others immediately closed watertight hatches between the compartments below deck. The damage had caused a power outage, spraying steam and ammunition had to be manually loaded into anti-aircraft guns. When the order to abandon ship was given, Storer leapt into the water 25 feet below. He swam until a boat rescued him and brought him back to the USS California, where he made an attempt to help save the ship.

==== Aftermath ====
During the three days prior to its sinking, Storer helped salvage the USS California while stationed at Ford Island. He was among about 200 of the salvage and gun crews who were counted by a delegation crew. Storer claims that list must have been misplaced and everyone listed was declared lost. He and three of his friends from home were presumed dead, along with one other who did actually die in the attack. He was the first man from Portland who was reported killed but it was not determined how that error happened.

On December 16, 1941, Rear Admiral Chester W. Nimitz contacted Storer's mother and claimed he was one of many men missing in action.

The Navy Department deeply regrets to inform you that your son Melvin Tyler Storer, shipfitter third class, U.S. Naval Reserve, was lost in action in the performance of his duty and in the service of his country.

Services for Storer were held on December 21 at Laurelwood Methodist Church. A melancholy was held on Christmas with Portland Mayor Earl Riley as the presenter of a miniature flag and pedestal with Storer's name and rank engraved. A week after the service, two postcards arrived on December 29, both with Storer's signature. Storer wrote to his parents dated from December 8 and December 12 to let them know he had survived. On January 1, 1942, a telegram from Rear Admiral Randall Jacobs arrived.

The Navy Department is glad to inform you that your son Melvin Tyler Storer, shipfitter third class, U.S. Naval Reserve, previously reported missing following action in the performance of his duty, is now reported to be a survivor.

In the aftermath of the attack, Storer stayed at Pearl Harbor for six months to help with the salvage and cleanup. He reunited with his family on a surprise visit during his leave, taking a bus from Bremerton, Washington.

== Other work ==
In 1947, Storer was recruited as a naval diver to search Odell Lake for two fishermen who went missing and believed to have drowned. The search attempt was called off after Storer and another diver determined the temperature of the water was too cold for survival to have been possible. He later moved to Chula Vista and became a welder at Rohr, Inc.

== Personal life ==
Storer was born in Portland, Oregon, to Frank and Lella Storer on April 17, 1921. He was baptized at Laurelwood Methodist Church, attended Joseph Kellogg School, Franklin High School, Benson High School, and was a member of the Fraternal Order of Eagles. Storer married Edith Dette Sherman on May 6, 1973, in San Diego, California. His brother, Corporal Joseph William Storer, was stationed at Camp Stewart.

== Death ==
Storer died on December 27, 2003, in Chula Vista, California and was buried at Glen Abbey Memorial Park in Bonita, California.

== Commendations ==
Awards
Image	Decoration	Notes	Ref.
Asiatic-Pacific Campaign Medal ribbon and streamer	Asiatic–Pacific Campaign Medal	Attack on Pearl Harbor	
