= Albert D. Cooley =

United States Marine Corps general

Albert Dustin Cooley
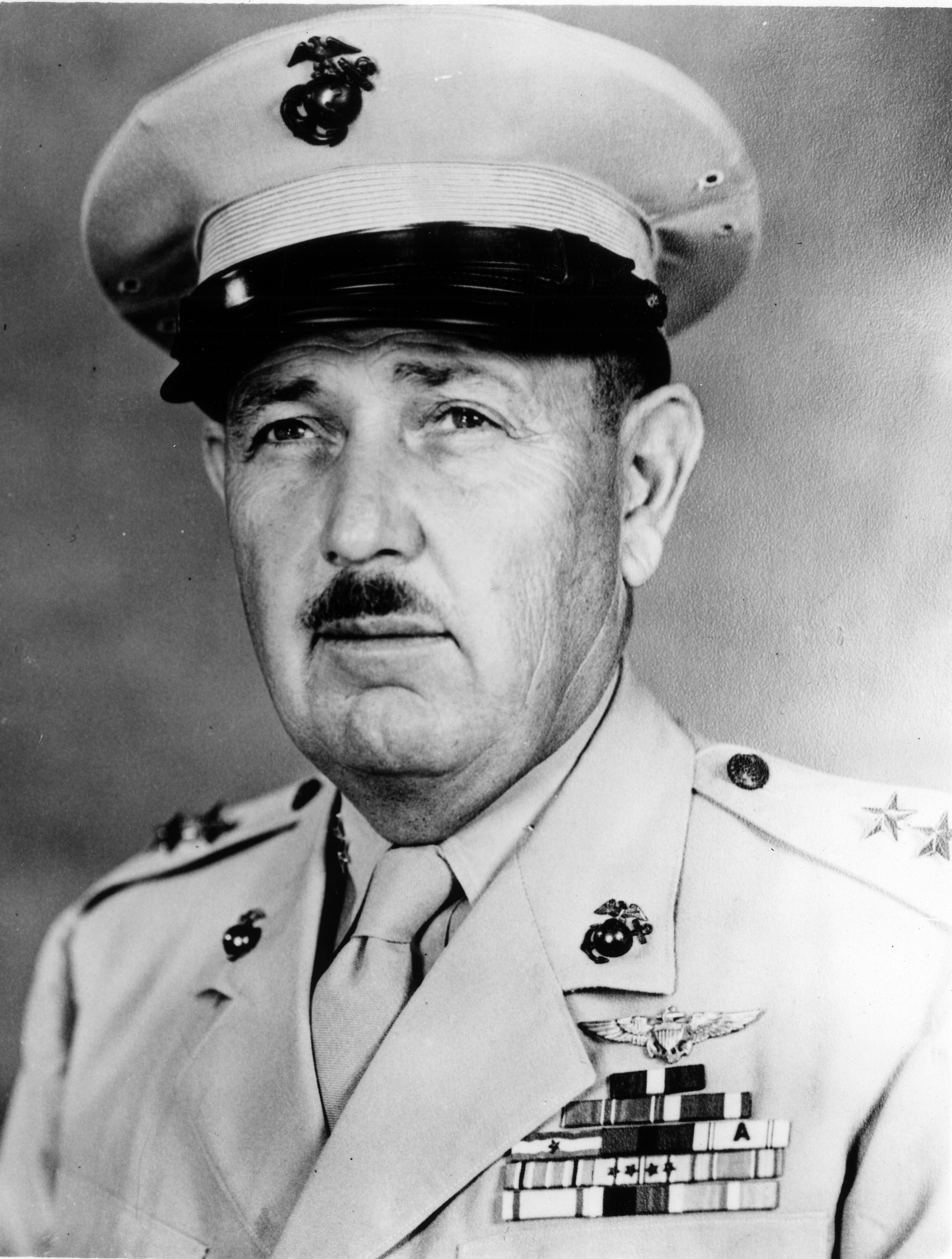
- Cooley as Major General, USMC
- Born: October 11, 1900; Billings, Montana, U.S.
- Died: December 10, 1976 (aged 76); Coronado, California, U.S.
- Military career
- Allegiance: United States of America
- Branch: United States Marine Corps
- Service years: 1921–1954
- Rank: Lieutenant general
- Service number: 0-3903
- Commands: 1st Marine Aircraft Wing; 3rd Marine Aircraft Wing; Marine Corps Air Station Quantico; Marine Aircraft Group 14; Marine Observation Squadron 1
- Conflicts: World War II: Battle of Guadalcanal; Naval Battle of Guadalcanal; Battle of the Santa Cruz Islands; Battle of Okinawa; Borneo campaign; Chinese Civil War
- Awards: Navy Cross; Bronze Star Medal; Air Medal

Albert Dustin Cooley (October 11, 1900 – December 10, 1976) was a highly decorated Naval aviator of the United States Marine Corps, who reached the rank of lieutenant general. For his actions during the Battle of Guadalcanal, he received the Navy Cross, the United States military's second-highest decoration awarded for valor in combat. Cooley completed his 33-year Marine Corps career as commanding general of the 1st Marine Aircraft Wing.

== Early career ==
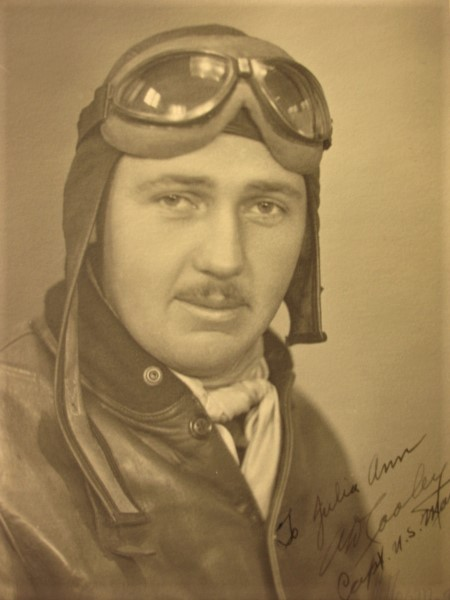
Cooley as Captain, USMC in 1930s.

Albert D. Cooley was born on October 11, 1900, in Billings, Montana, and following high school graduation enlisted in the Marine Corps in April 1921. After three years of enlisted service, Cooley reached the NCO ranks and received a Marine Corps Good Conduct Medal for his Exemplary behavior and efficiency. He was commissioned a second lieutenant and attached to the Basic School at Philadelphia Navy Yard for officers' training.

Following graduation in July 1925, Cooley was ordered as an infantry officer to the Marine Corps Base San Diego, California, where he remained until April 1926. He was then attached to the Marine detachment aboard the battleship USS Mississippi and took part in patrol cruises along the West Coast. Cooley was promoted to the rank of first lieutenant and requested flight training in February 1928 for which he was ordered to Naval Air Station San Diego.

He was designated a naval aviator in January 1929 and served during the next four years with Marine Squadron San Diego, as an instructor at Naval Air Station Pensacola, Florida and as executive officer of Marine Squadron aboard the aircraft carrier USS Lexington.

Cooley returned to San Diego in August 1933 and served again as a squadron commander and later as group operations officer. He reached the rank of captain and was attached to the Junior Course, Amphibious Warfare School within Marine Corps Schools, Quantico in June 1936. Upon the graduation in June 1937, Cooley was attached to the Bureau of Aeronautics under Rear Admiral Arthur B. Cook and served in that capacity until June 1940. In July 1940, Cooley was attached to the Marine Aircraft Group 1 on Quantico and later commanded Marine Observation Squadron 1 during Caribbean Maneuvers.

== World War II ==
=== Guadalcanal ===
Following the Japanese attack on Pearl Harbor in December 1941, Cooley was promoted to the rank of major and assumed command of newly activated Marine Aircraft Group 14 at Camp Kearny, California in March of the following year. He spent the next six months with training of his squadron and subsequently embarked for the South Pacific in August 1942. Cooley was meanwhile promoted to the rank of lieutenant colonel in May of that year.

Cooley and his squadron arrived as a part of 1st Marine Aircraft Wing under the command of Major General Roy S. Geiger on New Caledonia at the end of August 1942 and immediately engaged in fighting over Guadalcanal. Cooley also held second hat as commanding officer of 1st Marine Wing Bomber Command and personally led several attacks against Japanese ships and aircraft between September 23 and December 18, 1942. He displayed extraordinary heroism in action and received the Navy Cross. His official citations reads:

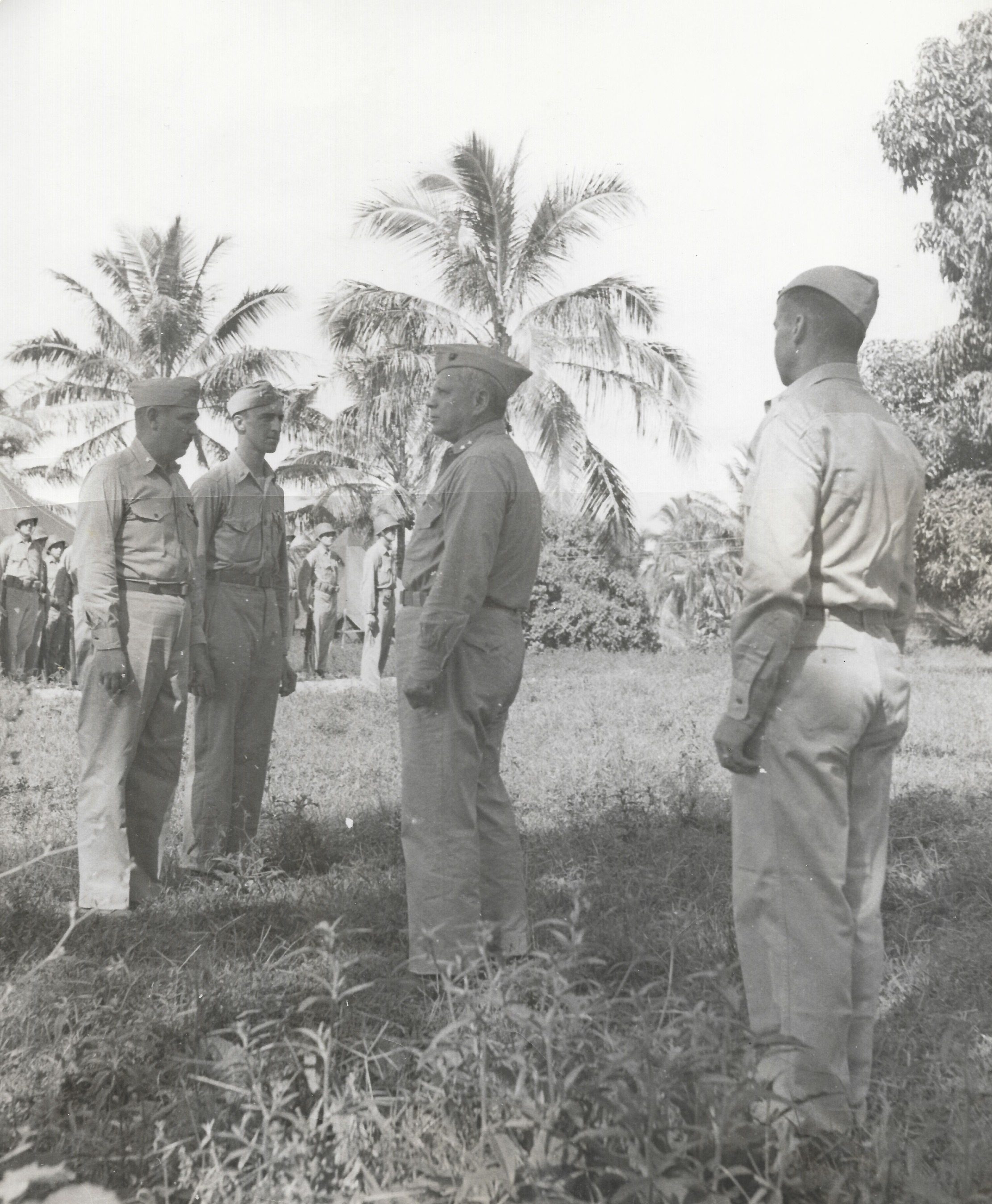
Colonel Albert Cooley receiving the Navy Cross in early 1943 from MajGen Roy Geiger for actions at Guadalcanal.

After months of strenuous combat had seriously depleted the number of men and amount of equipment, Lieutenant Colonel Cooley reorganized and skillfully built up the strength of his command. Leading a group of dive bombers and fighters on 12 October in a determined raid against enemy destroyers, he gallantly pressed home the attack, personally scoring a hit on one of the Japanese ships. On 14 October, with all but one of his planes put out of commission by terrific fire from enemy surface vessels, Lieutenant Colonel Cooley, in spite of intermittent bombing and shellfire from hostile artillery, worked tirelessly to direct the repair of damaged planes, with the result that twelve additional aircraft were placed in commission on that day in time to strike repeatedly at the enemy ship-borne invasion forces. Again from 11 to 15 November the Aviation Units under his command attacked the Japanese, destroying two cruisers, seven airplanes, and twelve transports contributing in great part to the success of our engagement in that area. Lieutenant Colonel Cooley's exceptional skill, leadership, and indomitable fighting spirit were in keeping with the highest traditions of the United States Naval Service.

=== Later service during World War II ===
In January 1943, Cooley was appointed Supply officer of the 1st Marine Aircraft Wing and also commanded simultaneously his old Marine Aircraft Group 14 until April of that year. He was promoted to the rank of colonel at the same time and ordered back to the United States, because Major General Geiger, 1st Marine Wing commander, was appointed Director of Marine Corps Aviation at Headquarters Marine Corps in Washington, D.C., and requested Cooley as his deputy.

He served as assistant director of Marine Corps Aviation until October 1944, when he was ordered to Marine Corps Air Station Santa Barbara, California, and appointed commander of newly activated Marine Carrier Groups, Aircraft, Fleet Marine Force, Pacific. In this capacity, Cooley directed the training and organization of Marine aircraft groups for close air support missions from navy carriers and subsequently received the Bronze Star Medal for this service.

Cooley was subsequently appointed commanding officer of Marine Air Support Group 48 in February 1945 and sailed again to the Pacific Area in May of that year. He commanded elements of his air group during the Battle of Okinawa and then during the attack on Borneo, Philippines.

In September, 1945, before the Japanese surrendered Formosa, Cooley landed on that island with a handful of Marines from Air Support Group 48 to supervise the removal of Allied prisoners of war. The Japanese on the island had given no assurance that they would not resist, and the American ships were forced to find their own way through enemy minefields before the Japanese began to cooperate. He subsequently received a letter of commendation for his handling of that difficult assignment.

== Later service ==
Colonel Cooley was ordered back to the United States and attached to the Senior Course at Naval War College in June 1946 and graduated one year later. He was then again appointed to the post of assistant director of Marine Corps aviation under Major General Field Harris and remained in that capacity until May 1948, when he assumed command of Marine Corps Air Station Quantico. In early 1950, Cooley was appointed commanding officer of the Junior School at Quantico, and while in that capacity, he was promoted to the rank of brigadier general in December 1950.

In April 1951, Cooley was appointed assistant director of Marine Corps aviation for the third time and served under Major General Clayton C. Jerome until May 1952. He then served as commanding officer of the 3rd Marine Aircraft Wing at Marine Corps Air Station Miami, Florida and received his promotion to the rank of major general in September 1953.

He was ordered to Korea in December 1953 where he assumed command of 1st Marine Aircraft Wing. Cooley and his wing did not see much combat and took part only in patrolling along the Korean Demilitarized Zone. He returned to the United States at the beginning of April 1954 and after several months of medical leave, Cooley retired from the Marine Corps after 33 years of active service in August of that year. He was advanced to the rank of lieutenant general on the retired list for having been specially commended in combat.

== Retirement ==
Following his retirement from the military, Cooley settled with his wife in Coronado, California, and was an active member of the Rotary Club there and one of three founders of the Coronado Municipal Golf Course. He was also a member of the board of trustees for the Marine Military Academy in Harlingen, Texas. Lieutenant General Albert D. Cooley died on December 10, 1976, and is buried at Glen Abbey Memorial Park.

== Decorations ==
Here is the ribbon bar of Lieutenant General Albert D. Cooley:

Naval Aviator Badge
1st Row	Navy Cross		Bronze Star Medal	Air Medal
2nd Row	Navy Presidential Unit Citation with one star	Marine Corps Good Conduct Medal	American Defense Service Medal with "A" Device	American Campaign Medal
3rd Row	Asiatic-Pacific Campaign Medal with four 3/16 inch service stars	World War II Victory Medal	China Service Medal	Navy Occupation Service Medal
4th Row	National Defense Service Medal	Korean Service Medal	Philippine Liberation Medal	United Nations Korea Medal

Military offices
Preceded by Vernon E. Megee	Commanding Officer of the 1st Marine Aircraft Wing; December 8, 1953 - March 1954	Succeeded by Verne J. McCaul

== See also ==
- Battle of Guadalcanal
- Naval Battle of Guadalcanal
- 1st Marine Aircraft Wing
- List of 1st Marine Aircraft Wing Commanders
