= National Softball Hall of Fame and Museum =

- Location of the Hall of Fame and Museum in Oklahoma National Softball Hall of Fame and Museum (the United States)
- Established: 1957, expanded in 1976
- Location: 2801 NE 50th Street in the Adventure District of Oklahoma City, Oklahoma, United States
- Coordinates: 35.5233376°N 97.4631822°W
- Type: Hall of fame
- Website: Official Website

National Softball Hall of Fame and Museum is a softball museum located in Oklahoma City's Adventure District. It includes the Don E. Porter Hall of Fame Stadium, home to the World Cup of Softball and the annual Women's College World Series.

== Amateur Softball Association ==
USA Softball (formerly the Amateur Softball Association) operates the National Softball Hall of Fame and Museum.

== See also ==
- National Fastpitch Coaches Association Hall of Fame
- Betty Evans Grayson, nicknamed "Bullet Betty," who was inducted into the Hall of Fame in 1959
