= Edith Abigail Purer =

Botanist, teacher, environmentalist, and artist (1895-1990)

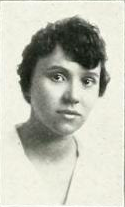
- Edith A. Purer, 1918
- Born: 11 December 1895; Illinois, US
- Died: 20 June 1990 (aged 94); San Diego County, California, US
- Resting place: Bonita, California
- Occupations: Ecologist, educator, artist
- Known for: Being California's first professional woman ecologist

Edith Abigail Purer (11 December 1895 – 20 June 1990) was a botanist, teacher, environmentalist, and artist. She was an early advocate for California State Parks, and the state's first female professional ecologist.

== Life ==
Edith Abigail Purer was born in Illinois on 11 December 1895, the daughter of William Alexander and Emily A. Purer (née Koupal). She attended Northwestern University and Chicago Normal College, whose 1918 yearbook described her as:

The most "high" brow of us all, and also, we believe, the most "Socially Efficient" in practice.

Her 1921 Master of Science thesis, with the University of Chicago, was on the ecology of the Douglas fir. Purer gained her PhD in 1933 from the University of Southern California; her thesis title was Studies of certain coastal sand dune plants of southern California. In 1936 published a book about the plants and wildflowers native to Silver Strand Beach State Park: Plants of Silver Strand Beach State Park... a visitors' handbook. She used the book to advocate for state parks generally, and throughout the following years sought to publish her research alongside working as a high school science teacher.

Purer published at least eight scientific articles in the distinguished journals of the Ecological Society of America, as well as presenting research at the ESA's annual meetings - one of very few woman to do so during the 1930s. The ecosystems on which much of Purer's work was focused (coastal sand dunes, salt marshes, and vernal pools) are particularly rare and threatened in California and the wider United States, leading to renewed interest in her work in recent years. Her studies have been used by subsequent ecologists to consider the impact of human activity, for example the loss of particular wildflowers in the vernal pools of San Diego County. She also made significant contributions to the herbarium of the San Diego Society of Natural History.

Purer was also a painter of landscapes, especially of California, where she exhibited regularly and became well known. She studied art alongside her teaching in the Chicago and San Diego school systems, and sketched on travels around Europe, Canada, Mexico, and the United States. She was a winner of the American Association of University Women's creative art award and certificate of merit.

Edith Abigail Purer died on 20 June 1990. She is buried in the Glen Abbey Memorial Park in Bonita, San Diego County.

== Selected published works ==
- 'Studies of Certain Coastal Sand Dune Plants of Southern California' in Ecological Monographs, Vol. 6: 1 (1936)
- 'Ecological Study of Vernal Pools, San Diego County' in Ecological Monographs, Vol. 20: 2 (1939)
