= Betty Evans Grayson =

American softball pitcher (1925–1979)

Personal information
- Nickname: Bullet Betty
- Born: October 9, 1925 Portland, Oregon, United States
- Died: July 9, 1979 (aged 53)
- Education: Franklin High School

Sport
- Sport: Softball
- Position: Pitcher
- Team: Lind and Pomeroy Florists’ team Chicago Queens

Betty Evans Grayson (October 9, 1925 – July 9, 1979) was an American softball pitcher, nicknamed "Bullet Betty." She played for the Lind and Pomeroy Florists’ team and the Chicago Queens.

== Biography ==
Grayson was born as Betty Evans on October 9, 1925, in Portland, Oregon. Grayson was educated at Franklin High School, Portland, graduating in 1944.

Grayson began playing softball aged 13. She initially played for the Lind and Pomeroy Florists’ softball team in the Portland City League as an outfielder, then trained as a pitcher under her father's coaching. Grayson pitched in her first of six ASA nationals championships in 1943.

In 1944, Grayson won the ASA National Title in the Women's Major Fastpitch Tournament in Cleveland, Ohio with the Lind and Pomeroy Florists’ softball team. She "dominated" the mound with four no-hitters. For her performance, the Oregon Sportswriters and Broadcasters Association named her “Woman Athlete of the Year.” She was nicknamed "Bullet Betty."

After playing for the Lind and Pomeroy Florists’ softball team for seventeen years, Grayson signed to play for the Chicago Queens for three years. By the end of her career, Grayson had a 456-99 won-loss record with 51 no-hitters and three perfect games.

Grayson was inducted into the ASA National Softball Hall of Fame in 1959. She was inducted into the Oregon Sports Hall of Fame as a member of the Lind & Pomeroy Florists in 1982. She was inducted into the Portland Interscholastic League Hall of Fame in 1985.

Grayson worked outside of her softball career as a clerk in the city of Portland's license bureau.

Grayson died of breast cancer in 1979, aged 53.
