= Glen Abbey Memorial Park =

Cemetery in San Diego County

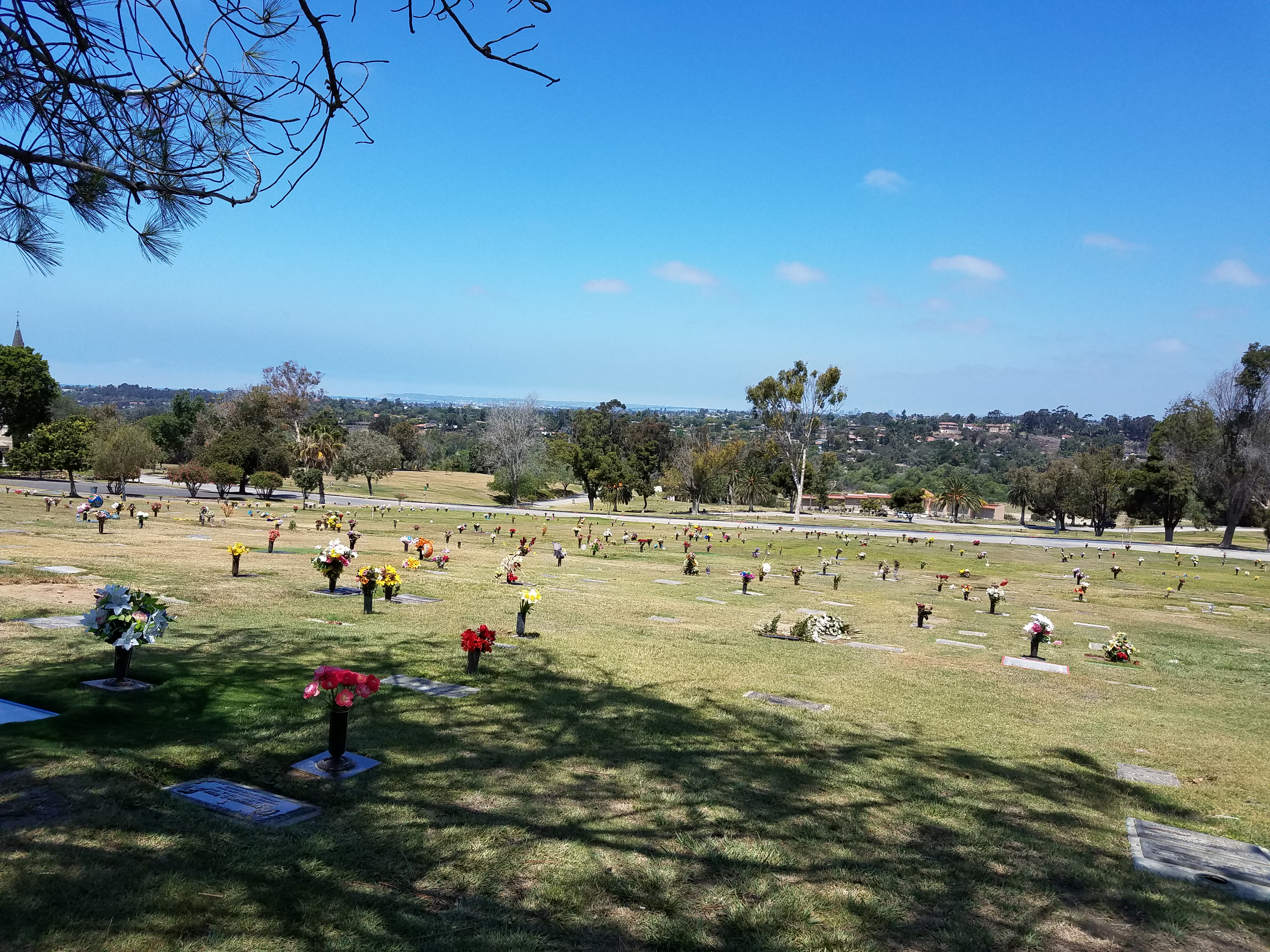
- Interactive map of Glen Abbey Memorial Park

Details
- Established: 1923
- Location: Bonita, California
- Coordinates: 32°39′08″N 117°02′41″W
- Website: glenabbeysandiego.net

Glen Abbey Memorial Park is a cemetery in San Diego County, California. It was established in 1923 and had its first burial in 1924. Little Chapel of the Roses is featured at the park and Kate Sessions helped choose the trees that were planted. In 1978, Doug Hegdahl was a guest speaker at an annual Memorial Day event. Before he was Mayor of San Diego, Percy J. Benbough called it "one of the most beautiful Memorial Parks in the Golden West." During the 2020s, thefts of flower vases and headstones were reported.

== Notable interments ==
- Albert D. Cooley, U.S. Marine Corps general
- Jesse Crawford, Theatre Organist, Pianist
- Kathy Fiscus
- Wladimir Jan Kochanski, pianist
- Hugh C. Leighton, co-founder and president of Interstate News Company
- Bill Muncey, racer
- Edith Abigail Purer, teacher
- Renato del Prado, actor
- George Seals, professional football player
- Melvin Storer, U.S. Navy shipfitter and survivor at the Attack on Pearl Harbor
- Peaches Wallace, aviator
