= Wladimir Jan Kochanski =

Wladimir Jan Kochanski (5 December 1935 – 24 March 2015) was a graduate of the Juilliard School of Music and enjoyed a long career as a concert pianist. Throughout his career, the Texas-born virtuoso retained a loyal following. Other pianists admired his musicianship, while several studied with him privately and/or attended his summer master-classes in Southern California. In an effort to tear down barriers that can exist between classical performers and their audiences, Kochanski's concerts mixed humorous stories with classical music selections. Kochanski advertised himself as a "classical music entertainer".

== Career notes ==
During his six years at Juilliard, Kochanski studied with Eduard Steuermann (1892-1964), and briefly with Rosina Lhévinne (1880-1976) who was also Van Cliburn’s teacher at the time. Shortly before completing studies at Juilliard, Kochanski was stricken with chronic internal bleeding, which caused the pianist to be hospitalized for three years. With a financial inheritance from Dr. Della Pennington (the doctor who helped restore his health), Kochanski formed the Della Moser Pennington Foundation (a non-profit corporation founded solely for the purpose of giving financial aid to gifted young musicians), which was subsequently dissolved. Kochanski did not begin to construct a concert career until he was approaching forty-years old. The guiding reference in shaping his professional persona and name was the legendary Polish pianist, Ignacy Jan Paderewski (1860-1941). Kochanski initially embarked upon a career using his birth-name, Robert Harvey. His first album, "Robert Harvey Plays Your Favorite Piano Classics" and a handbook for students, "The Magic Key to Keyboard Success," were produced under his given name. Although not of Polish ancestry, his sympathetic identification with Poland inspired Harvey to change his name in the 1970s. Thus, the pianist reintroduced himself as Wladimir Jan Kochanski with his autobiography, "The People's Pianist." Throughout the remainder of his concert/recording career, the pianist was known as Kochanski. He also converted to Mormonism, the religion of his manager, and thereafter played extensively for Mormon audiences.

On numerous occasions, Kochanski played for notables, including a private concert for Pope John Paul II, as well as performances on television shows such as The 700 Club, Hour Magazine, Good Morning America and Voice of America. His autobiography, The People's Pianist was published in 1981 by Crown Summit Books. Besides his music, he gained publicity by drawing attention to the welfare of needy Poles within Poland, for which he has received the Order of Polonia Restituta.

== Proteges and pupils ==
Kochanski taught casually for many years although none of his students have achieved recognition in the classical music world. Among his various students was pop-singer Christine Anderson. Kochanski seldom taught strictly piano technique, but lectured primarily in broad terms about music inspiration. This was especially true of his master-classes as students often attended in-conjunction with instruction from their own private teachers.

== Awards and recognitions ==
- He is a Baldwin Notable Artist, also appearing as a PianoDisc popular artist
- Order of Polonia Restituta

== Personal life ==
In his autobiography, Kochanski claimed to have been previously married and widowed; however, public records documenting this union or the existence of a spouse have not been located. In 2003, due to an unsuccessful operation on his lower back, Kochanski was forced into early retirement. At that time, he relocated to the desert of Southern California, where he spent the remainder of his life. On 24 March 2015, Kochanski died after suffering a heart attack. His body was interred at Glen Abbey Memorial Park in Bonita, California.
