= Vernon E. Megee =

United States Marine Corps general (1900–1992)

Vernon Edgar Megee
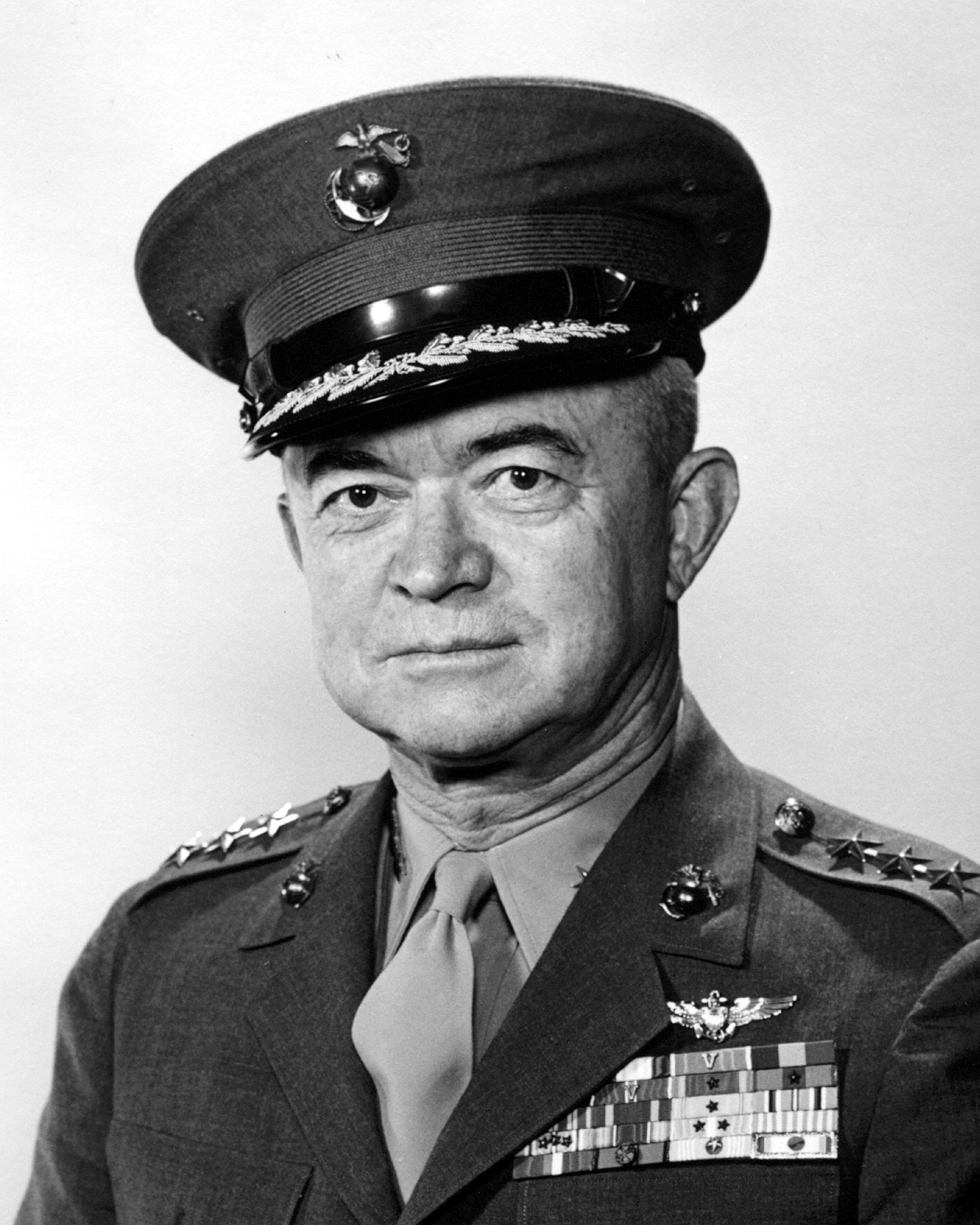
- Lieutenant General Vernon E. Megee
- Born: June 5, 1900; Tulsa, Oklahoma
- Died: January 14, 1992 (aged 91); Albuquerque, New Mexico, US
- Burial place: Arlington National Cemetery
- Military career
- Allegiance: United States
- Branch: United States Marine Corps
- Service years: 1919–1959
- Rank: General
- Commands: MCAS Cherry Point; 1st Marine Aircraft Wing; Fleet Marine Force, Atlantic; Assistant Commandant of the Marine Corps; Fleet Marine Force, Pacific; Marine Fighter Attack Squadron 211
- Conflicts: World War II; Battle of Iwo Jima; Battle of Okinawa
- Awards: Army Distinguished Service Medal; Legion of Merit with Combat "V"; Navy and Marine Corps Medal; Bronze Star Medal with Combat "V"
- Other work: Superintendent, Marine Military Academy

General Vernon Edgar Megee (June 5, 1900 – January 14, 1992) was a United States Marine Corps general. He is recognized as a pioneer in the development of close air support for ground combat operations. He served as Assistant Commandant of the Marine Corps from 1956 to 1957; with his final billet from 1957 to 1959 as commanding general, Fleet Marine Force, Pacific. When he retired from the Marine Corps, after 40 years of active duty service, he received a promotion to 4-star rank.

== Biography ==
Vernon Megee was born in Tulsa, Oklahoma, on June 5, 1900. After attending Oklahoma A&M College from 1917 to 1919, he enlisted in the Marine Corps in 1919, and spent the next two years on garrison duty at Parris Island, South Carolina. In 1921, he was selected for Officer Candidate School (OCS).

=== Early Marine Corps career — 1920s ===
In 1922, upon graduation from OCS, Megee was commissioned a second lieutenant. For the next several years he held many positions in Marine forces stationed abroad, including one tour of duty in Haiti and two tours of duty in China. He served his first tour of expeditionary duty with the 1st Marine Brigade in Haiti from October 1923 to November 1925. He was then stationed with the 10th Marines at Quantico, Virginia. He was promoted to first lieutenant in March 1926. In April 1927 Megee deployed to China on his second tour of expeditionary duty. On return to the States in March 1928, he was assigned to preliminary aviation training at the Naval Air Station, San Diego, California. In January 1929 he began another tour of expeditionary service as Squadrons Quartermaster, Aircraft Squadrons, 2nd Marine Brigade, in Nicaragua. After earning the Navy and Marine Corps Medal there, he returned to the United States to enter flight training at Pensacola, Florida in January 1931.

=== Marine aviator — 1930s ===
In February 1932 he qualified as a naval aviator, and was assigned to Aircraft Squadrons, West Coast Expeditionary Forces in San Diego, California. From June 1933 to August 1936, he was an instructor at the Marine Corps School in Quantico, Virginia. From the period of August 1936 to June 1939, he attended the Air Corps Tactical School at Maxwell Field in Alabama, after which he returned to Quantico as an instructor until July 1939. From July 1939 until 1940, he was Commander of Marine Fighter Squadron 2, 2nd Marine Aircraft Wing. From 1940 to 1943, Megee was the executive officer of the U.S. Naval Aviation Mission to Peru.

=== World War II; 1940s ===
In November 1943, Megee checked into Marine Corps Air Station Cherry Point and was designated as the Chief of Staff of the 3rd Marine Aircraft Wing (3d MAW). At the time 3d MAW was in charge of pilot training. In the spring of 1944, 3d MAW was designated to go to Hawaii to absorb the functions of Marine Air, Hawaiian Area. Megee left the United States in late April on board the USS Hoggatt Bay (CVE-75). He remained with the 3d Marine Aircraft Wing as they got established at Marine Corps Air Station Ewa in May 1944. In October 1944, Colonel Magee was named as the commanding officer of Provisional Air Support Command whose role was to organize, train and equip Marine units to duplicate the air control function of the navy but do it ashore. He served in combat in World War II on Iwo Jima and Okinawa. During the Battle of Iwo Jima, he was commander of Landing Force Air Support Control Unit One. For his service in this capacity, he was awarded the Legion of Merit with Combat "V". During the Battle of Okinawa, he commanded all the Marine Landing Force Air Support Control units, for which he was awarded the Bronze Star Medal with Combat "V".

=== 1950s — Commands, Assistant Commandant ===
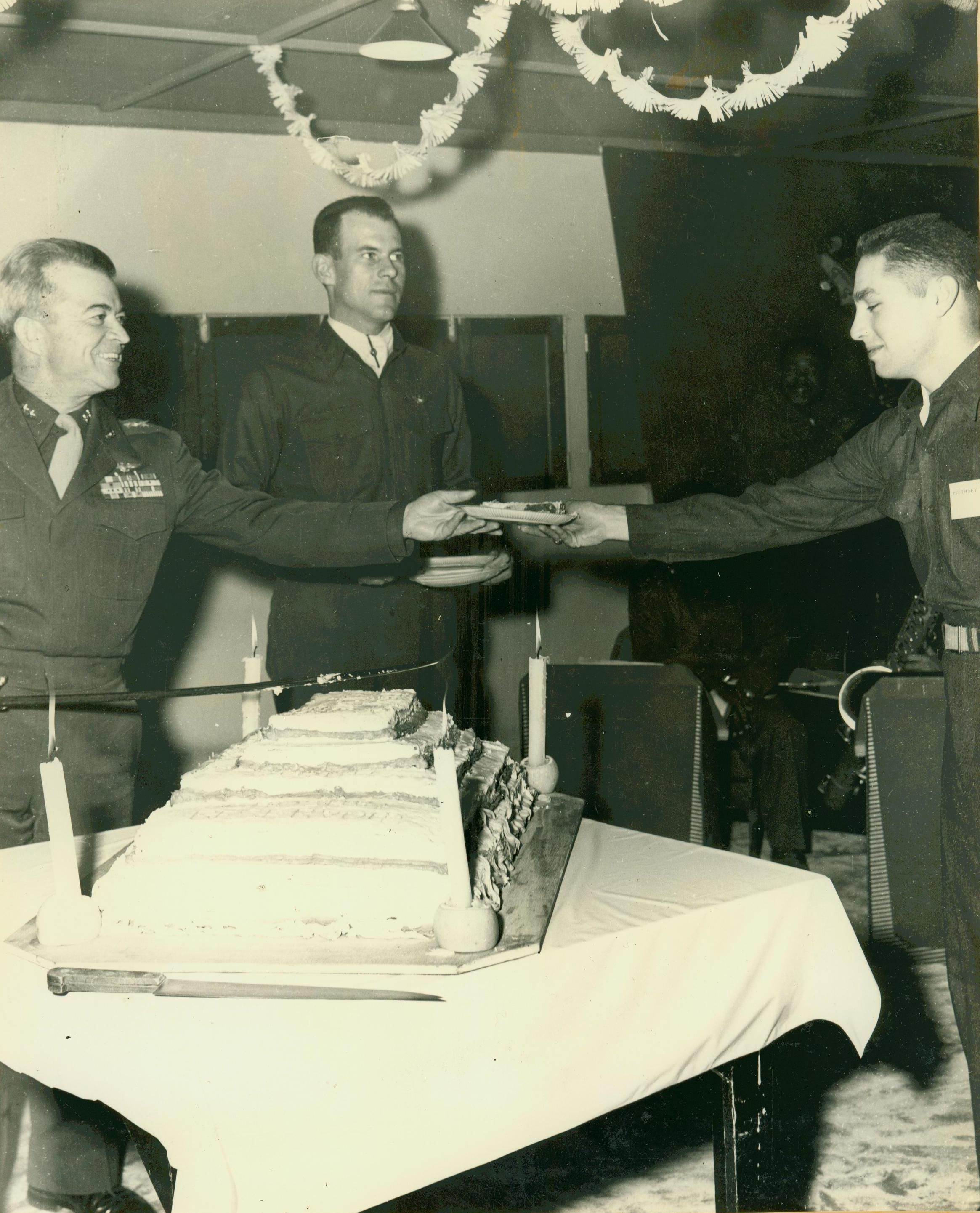
Megee during the 1953 Marine Corps Birthday in Korea.

After the war, he became an instructor at the National War College, and was promoted to brigadier general in December 1946. From January 1947 to January 1950, he served as assistant director of Marine Corps Aviation.

Megee finished his bachelor's degree with Oklahoma A&M in 1950, and then served in a variety of positions in the Department of Defense and held several commands: Marine Corps Air Station, Cherry Point Commanding General, Aircraft, Fleet Marine Force, Pacific, First Marine Aircraft Wing, and commanding general, Aircraft, Fleet Marine Force, Atlantic. He commanded the 1st Marine Aircraft Wing during the Korean War from January to December, 1953. He was awarded the Army Distinguished Service Medal for his service during this time.

He was promoted to lieutenant general in January 1956. From January 1956 to December 1957, he was Assistant Commandant and Chief of Staff of the Marine Corps., the first Marine aviator to serve as assistant commandant. Then from December 1957 to November 1959, he was the commanding general of the Fleet Marine Force, Pacific.

Megee retired from the Marine Corps in November 1959 and was advanced to the rank of general upon retirement by reason of having been specially commended in combat.

=== In retirement ===
After retirement, he settled in Austin, Texas, and attended graduate school at the University of Texas, earning his Master of Arts degree in 1963 – writing a Master's thesis titled "United States Military Intervention in Nicaragua, 1902–1932." He helped organize the Marine Military Academy at Harlingen, Texas, where he served as superintendent and president of the board of trustees from 1964 to 1988. He was a member of the National Rifle Association of America and wrote numerous articles on firearms for various sporting magazines.

Megee died in Albuquerque, New Mexico, on January 14, 1992, at age 91 and was buried at Arlington National Cemetery with his wife Nell.

== Awards and decorations ==
Megee's awards and decorations include:

Naval Aviator Badge
1st Row	Army Distinguished Service Medal	Legion of Merit w/ Combat "V"	Navy and Marine Corps Medal	Bronze Star Medal w/ Combat "V"
2nd Row	Navy Unit Commendation w/ one 3/16" bronze star	Marine Corps Good Conduct Medal	Marine Corps Expeditionary Medal w/ one 3/16" bronze star	Nicaraguan Campaign Medal (1933)
3rd Row	Yangtze Service Medal	American Defense Service Medal w/ Base clasp (3/16" bronze star)	American Campaign Medal	Asiatic-Pacific Campaign Medal w/ three 3/16" bronze stars
4th Row	World War II Victory Medal	National Defense Service Medal	Korean Service Medal w/ two 3/16" bronze stars	Peruvian Aviation Cross
5th Row	Order of Military Merit, Taeguk Cordon Medal	Republic of Korea Presidential Unit Citation	Philippine Liberation Medal	United Nations Korea Medal

Military offices
Preceded by Edwin A. Pollock	Commanding General of the Fleet Marine Force, Pacific; December 1, 1957 - November 1, 1959	Succeeded by Thomas A. Wornham
Preceded by Randolph M. Pate	Assistant Commandant of the Marine Corps; January 1, 1956 - November 30, 1957	Succeeded by Verne J. McCaul
Preceded by Clayton C. Jerome	Commanding General of the 1st Marine Aircraft Wing; January 9, 1953 - December 7, 1953	Succeeded by Albert D. Cooley

== See also ==
- List of United States Marine Corps four-star generals
- Commandant of the Marine Corps
