= Statue of Benjamin Franklin (Portland, Oregon) =

Statue of Benjamin Franklin in Portland, Oregon

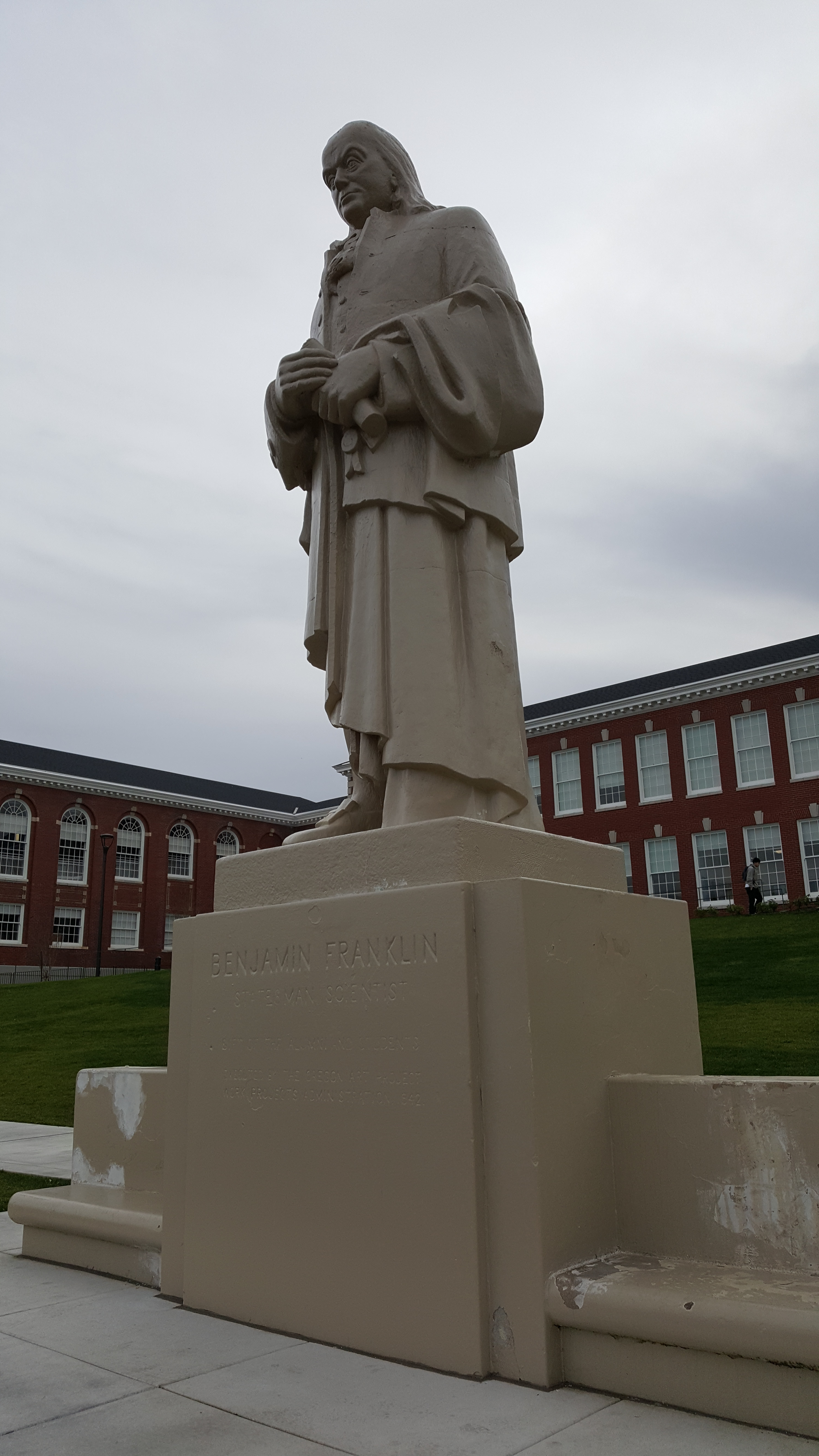
- The statue in 2018
- Artist: George Berry
- Year: 1942
- Type: Sculpture
- Subject: Benjamin Franklin
- Dimensions: 4.6 m (15 ft)
- Location: Portland, Oregon, United States; 45.50279°N 122.60689°W
- Owner: Franklin High School

A statue of Benjamin Franklin stands outside Franklin High School, in Portland, Oregon's South Tabor neighborhood, in the United States. A work by the sculptor George Berry and his assistants, it was installed in 1942.

== Description and history ==
The sculpture was one of two Works Progress Administration (WPA) projects benefitting Franklin between 1939 and 1942; the other was the construction of the school's athletic field. The statue was funded by Franklin alumni and students, who raised $15,000 to commission an artist from the Federal Art Project, one of WPA's five independent branches. George Berry and his team of assistants created a 40-ton sandstone statue of Franklin, which was erected at the school's north entrance, overlooking the athletic field, in 1942. Including its pedestal, the work measures 15-foot (4.6 m) tall. The pedestal includes built-in benches and the inscription, "One today is worth two tomorrows."

In 2016, the statue was removed temporarily and then returned as part of a major renovation project.

== See also ==
- 1942 in art
- Benjamin Franklin in popular culture
