= 1942 in fine arts of the Soviet Union =

The year 1942 was marked by many events that left an imprint on the history of Soviet and Russian fine arts.

== Events ==
- January 1 — Exhibition «Landscape of our Motherland» was opened in the Central Exhibition Hall in Moscow. Exhibited 188 works of painting and agraphics of 88 authors. The participants were Pyotr Konchalovsky, Nikolay Krymov, Alexander Osmerkin, Konstantin Yuon, and other important Soviet artists.
- January 2 — «The First Exhibition of works by Leningrad artists during the Great Patriotic War» was opened in the Leningrad Union of Artists. In August, the exhibition was shown in Moscow. The participants were Ivan Bilibin, Vladimir Konashevich, Aleksandr Laktionov, Vladimir Lebedev, Vsevolod Lyshev, Yaroslav Nikolaev, and other important Leningrad artists.

== Deaths ==
- January 29 — Vladimir Grinberg (Russian: Гринберг Владимир Ариевич), Russian Soviet painter, graphic artist, and art educator. Died of hunger in blockade Leningrad (b. 1896).
- February 2 — David Zagoskin (Russian: Загоскин Давид Ефимович), Russian Soviet painter, graphic artist, and art educator. Died of hunger in blockade Leningrad (b. 1900).
- February 5 — Karev Alexei (Russian: Карев Алексей Еремеевич), Russian Soviet painter, graphic artist, and art educator. Died of hunger in blockade Leningrad (b. 1879).
- February 7 — Ivan Bilibin (Russian: Билибин Иван Яковлевич), Russian Soviet painter, graphic artist, and art educator. Died of hunger in blockade Leningrad (b. 1876).
- February 9 — Nikolai Bublikov (Russian: Бубликов Николай Евлампиевич), Russian Soviet marine painter. Died of hunger in blockade Leningrad (b. 1871).
- February 19 — Vasily Fyodorov (Russian: Фёдоров Василий Фёдорович), Russian Soviet painter. Died of hunger in blockade Leningrad (b. 1894).
- February 23 — Alexei Pochtenny (Russian: Почтенный Алексей Петрович), Russian Soviet painter and graphic artist. Died of hunger in blockade Leningrad (b. 1895).
- February 25 — Alexander Savinov (Russian: Савинов Александр Иванович), Russian Soviet painter, graphic artist, and art educator. Died of hunger in blockade Leningrad (b. 1881).
- October 18 — Mikhail Nesterov (Russian: Нестеров Михаил Васильевич), Russian Soviet painter, Honored Art worker of Russian Federation (b. 1862).
- December 29 — Nikolai Radlov (Russian: Радлов Николай Эрнестович), Russian Soviet artist and art critic (b. 1889).

=== Full date unknown ===
- Dmitry Kiplik (Russian: Киплик Дмитрий Иосифович), Russian Soviet painter and art educator (b. 1865).
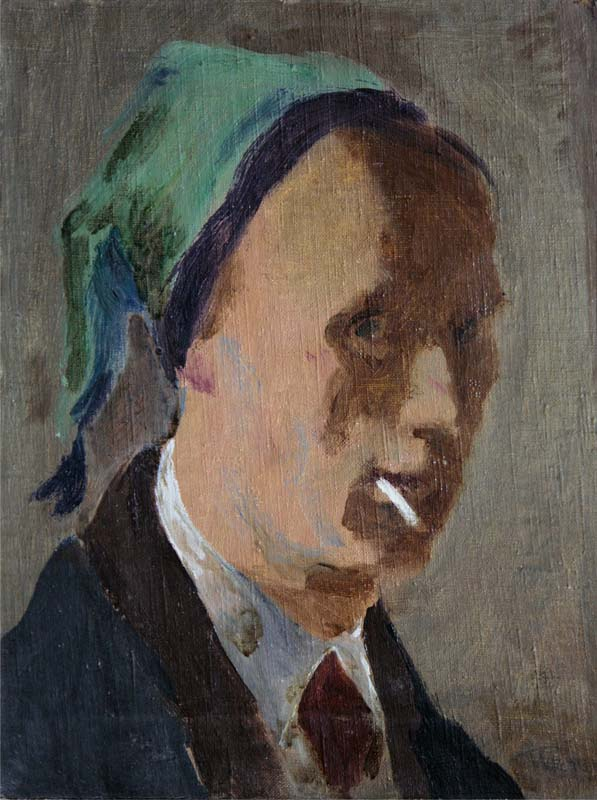
Vladimir Grinberg, (self-portrait)

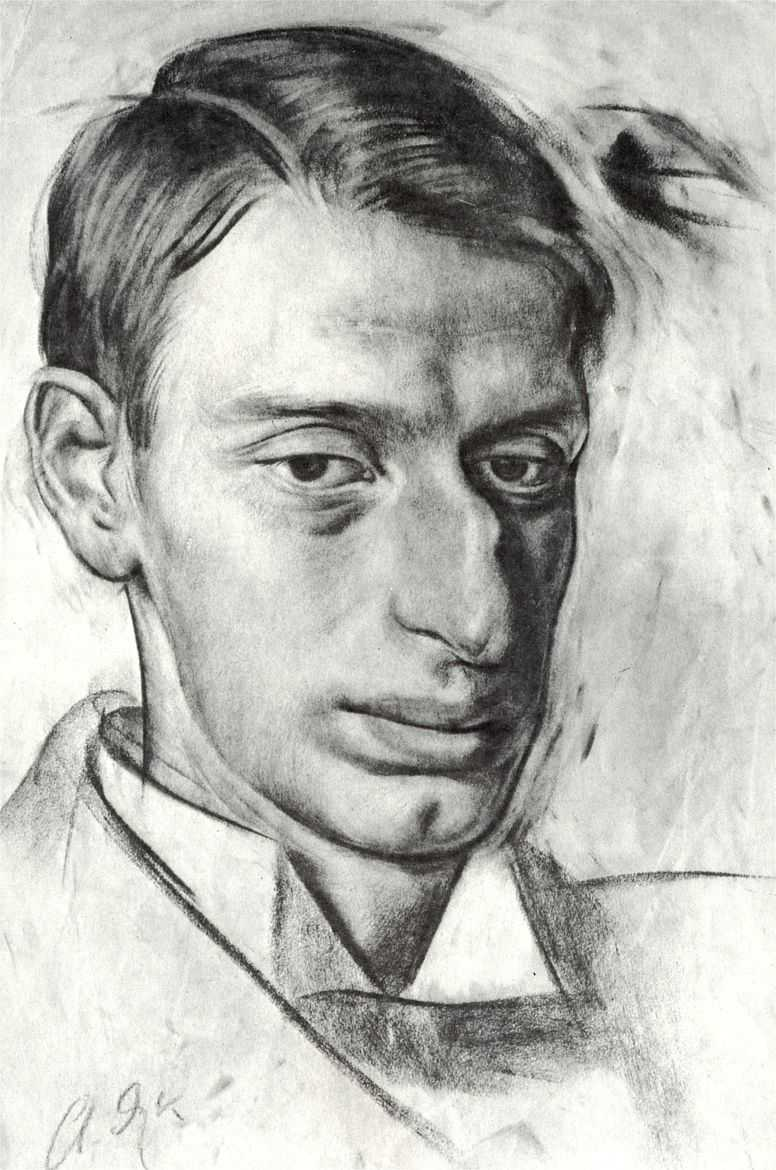
Nikolai Radlov

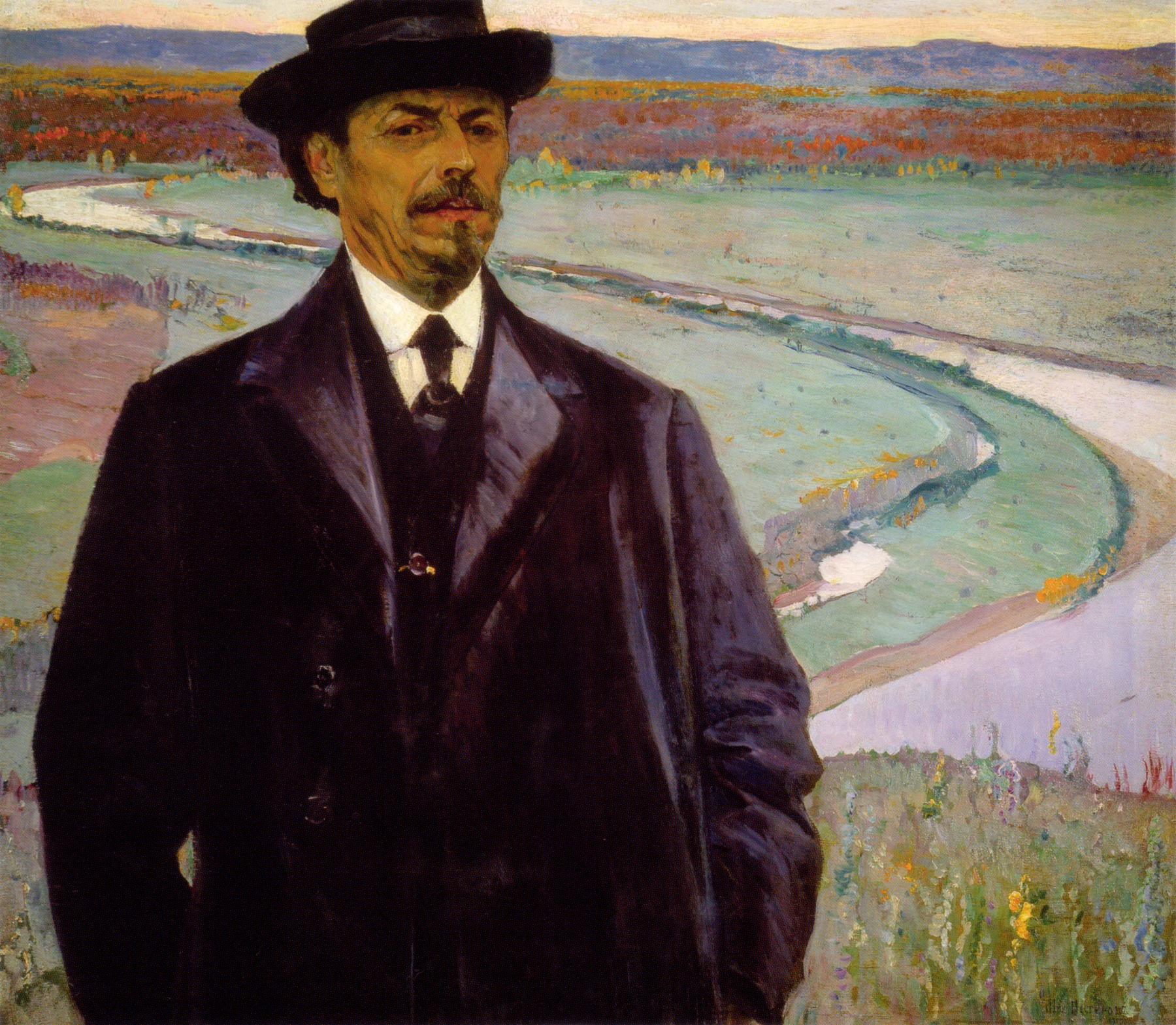
Mikhail Nesterov

Ivan Bilibin

== See also ==
- List of Russian artists
- List of painters of Leningrad Union of Artists
- Saint Petersburg Union of Artists
- Russian culture
- 1942 in the Soviet Union

== Sources ==
- Каталог выставки "Пейзаж нашей родины". М., МССХ, 1942.
- Выставка "Работы московских художников в дни Великой Отечественной войны". М., Государственная Третьяковская галерея, 1942.
- Выставка "Работы ленинградских художников в дни Великой Отечественной войны". М-Л., Искусство, 1942.
- Великая Отечественная война. Каталог выставки. М., Комитет по делам искусств при СНК СССР, 1943.
- Выставки советского изобразительного искусства. Справочник. Том 3. 1941—1947 годы. М., Советский художник, 1973.
- Artists of Peoples of the USSR. Biobibliography Dictionary. Vol. 1. Moscow, Iskusstvo, 1970.
- Artists of Peoples of the USSR. Biobibliography Dictionary. Vol. 2. Moscow, Iskusstvo, 1972.
- Directory of Members of Union of Artists of USSR. Volume 1,2. Moscow, Soviet Artist Edition, 1979.
- Directory of Members of the Leningrad branch of the Union of Artists of Russian Federation. Leningrad, Khudozhnik RSFSR, 1980.
- Artists of Peoples of the USSR. Biobibliography Dictionary. Vol. 4 Book 1. Moscow, Iskusstvo, 1983.
- Directory of Members of the Leningrad branch of the Union of Artists of Russian Federation. – Leningrad: Khudozhnik RSFSR, 1987.
- Персональные и групповые выставки советских художников. 1917-1947 гг. М., Советский художник, 1989.
- Artists of peoples of the USSR. Biobibliography Dictionary. Vol. 4 Book 2. – Saint Petersburg: Academic project humanitarian agency, 1995.
- Link of Times: 1932 – 1997. Artists – Members of Saint Petersburg Union of Artists of Russia. Exhibition catalogue. – Saint Petersburg: Manezh Central Exhibition Hall, 1997.
- Matthew C. Bown. Dictionary of 20th Century Russian and Soviet Painters 1900-1980s. – London: Izomar, 1998.
- Vern G. Swanson. Soviet Impressionism. – Woodbridge, England: Antique Collectors' Club, 2001.
- Петр Фомин. Живопись. Воспоминания современников. СПб., 2002. С.107.
- Время перемен. Искусство 1960—1985 в Советском Союзе. СПб., Государственный Русский музей, 2006.
- Sergei V. Ivanov. Unknown Socialist Realism. The Leningrad School. – Saint-Petersburg: NP-Print Edition, 2007. – ISBN 5-901724-21-6, ISBN 978-5-901724-21-7.
- Anniversary Directory graduates of Saint Petersburg State Academic Institute of Painting, Sculpture, and Architecture named after Ilya Repin, Russian Academy of Arts. 1915 – 2005. – Saint Petersburg: Pervotsvet Publishing House, 2007.
