= Shipfitter =

Shipbuilding occupation

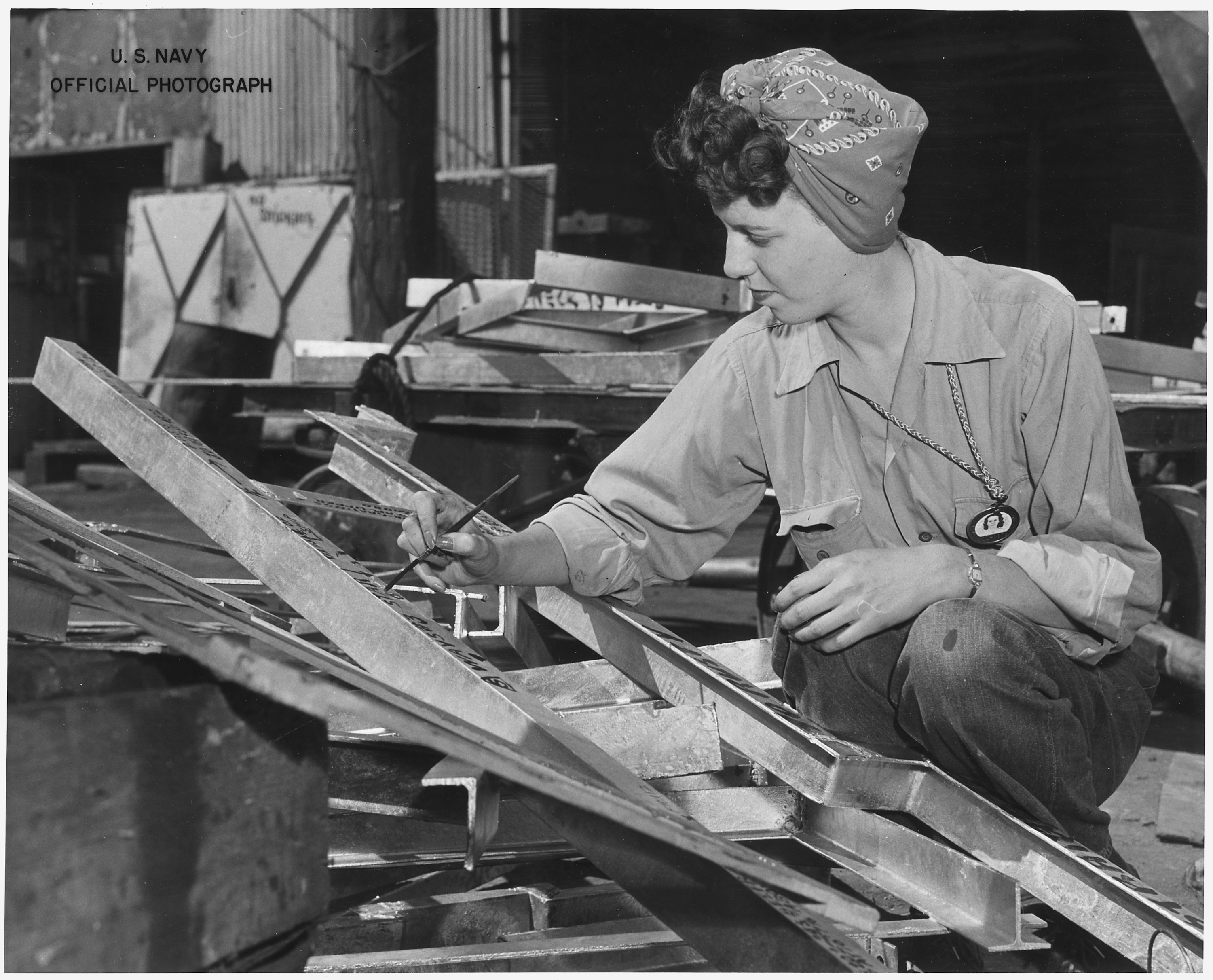
A US Navy shipfitter, c. 1943

A shipfitter is a marine occupational classification used both by naval activities and among ship builders; however, the term applies mostly to certain workers at commercial and naval shipyards during the construction or repair phase of a ship.

The term is derived from the words "ship" and "fit" -- essentially, "fitting" parts of the "ship" together.

== Naval usage ==
A shipfitter is an enlisted or civilian person who works on materials such as high-tensile steel and high yield strength steel.

Shipfitters fabricate, assemble and erect all structural parts of a ship, coordinate all fixed tank work performed on submarines and ships, and coordinate all sonar dome work. Shipfitters also use heavy machinery, such as plate planners, shears, punches, drill presses, bending rolls, bending slabs, plate bevelers, saws, presses up to 750 tons, angle rolls (vertical and horizontal), dogs and wedges. Shipfitters are responsible for hydro and air testing of tanks and compartments, as well as perform grinding, drilling and fit-up operations on submarines and surface crafts.

== Ship builder usage ==
A shipfitter is a worker who “fits” together the structural portions of a ship by either welding or by riveting.

== See also ==
- Metalworking
- Shipbuilding
- List of United States Navy ratings
