= Mulry Square =

Site in New York City

Coordinates: 40.7363°N 74.0011°W

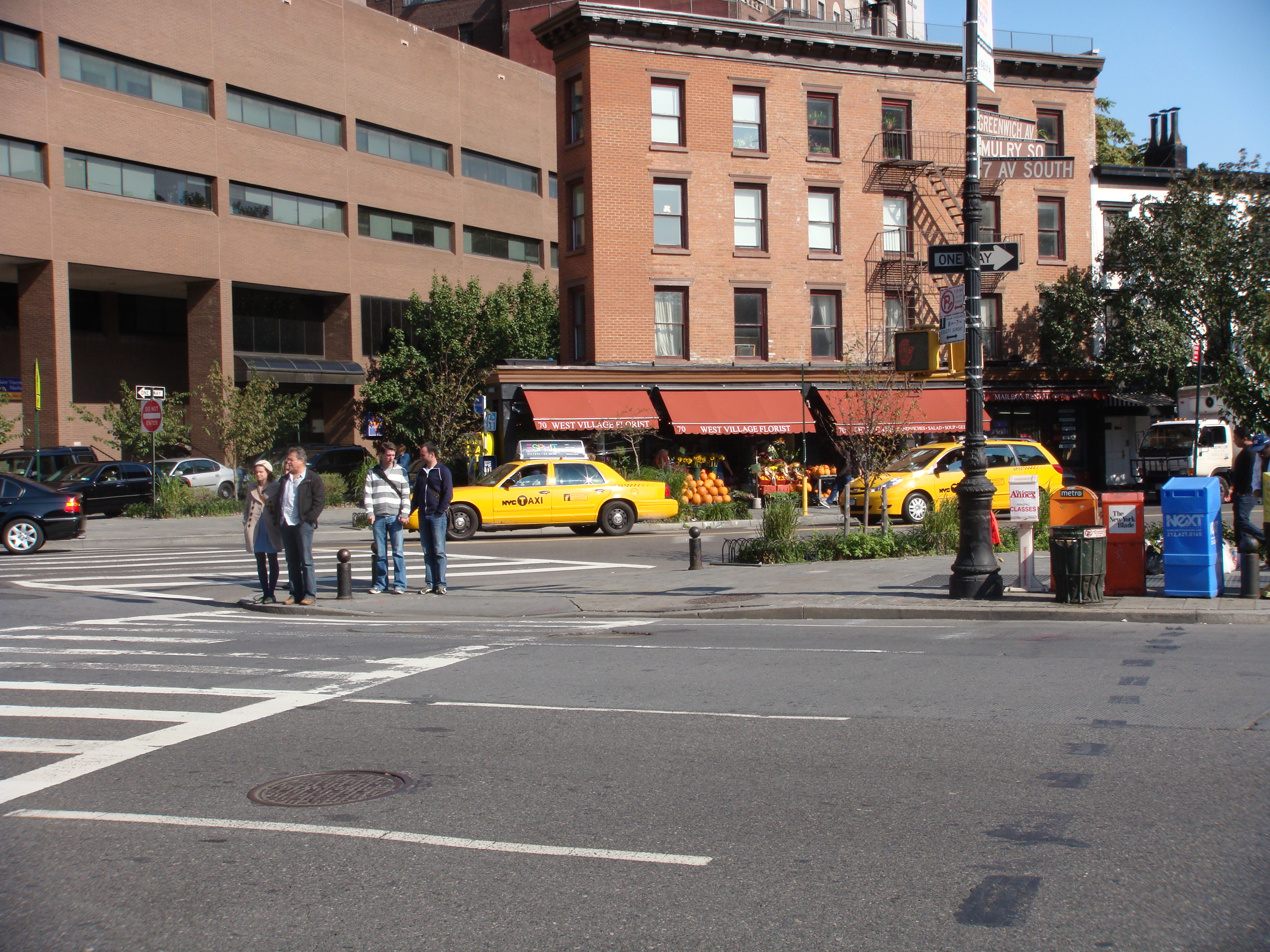
Mulry Square

Mulry Square is a triangular site at the southwest corner of Greenwich Avenue and Seventh Avenue South in Greenwich Village, Manhattan, New York City. It was once thought to be the site of a wedge-shaped diner that was the inspiration for Edward Hopper's famous painting Nighthawks. The parking lot's fencing supports Tiles for America, a September 11 memorial consisting of some 6,000 tiles created across the country.

The square, which is owned by the Metropolitan Transportation Authority, is named after Thomas M. Mulry, founder of the Emigrant Savings Bank and devoted Vincentian.

In 2007, the square was considered as a site for a New York City Subway ventilation plant.
