= Nighthawks (Hopper) =

1942 painting by Edward Hopper

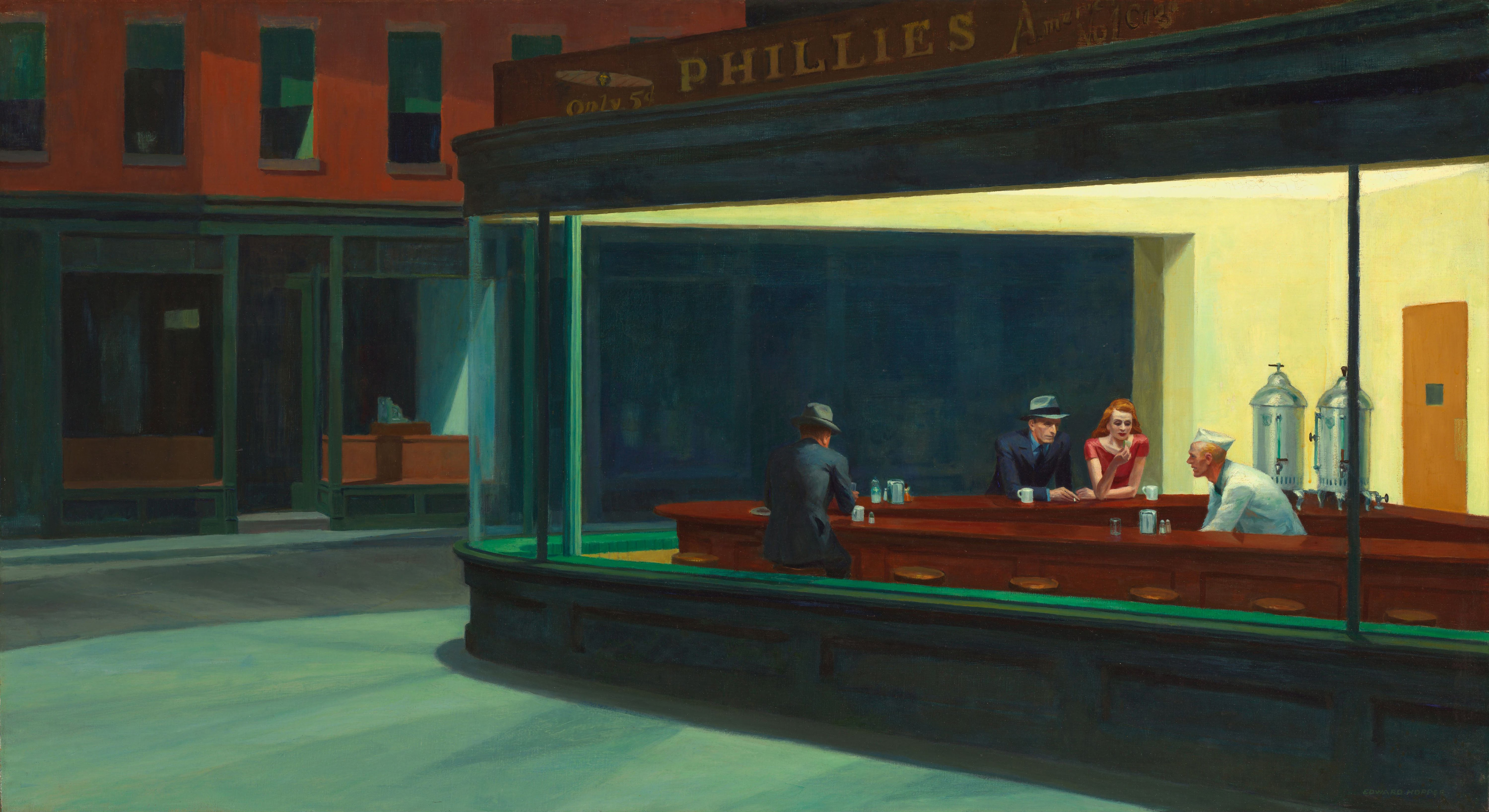
- Artist: Edward Hopper
- Year: 1942
- Medium: Oil on canvas
- Movement: American realism
- Dimensions: 84.1 cm (33.1 in) × 152.4 cm (60.0 in)
- Location: Art Institute of Chicago
- Accession: 1942.51

Nighthawks is a 1942 oil on canvas painting by the American artist Edward Hopper that portrays four people in a downtown diner late at night, as viewed through the diner's large glass window. The light coming from the diner illuminates a darkened and deserted urban streetscape.

The painting has been described as Hopper's best-known work and is one of the most recognizable paintings in American art. Classified as part of the American Realism movement, within months of its completion, it was sold to the Art Institute of Chicago for $3,000 (equivalent to $59,110 in 2025).

== About the painting ==
It has been suggested that Hopper was inspired by a short story of Ernest Hemingway's, either "The Killers" (1927), which Hopper greatly admired, or the more philosophical "A Clean, Well-Lighted Place" (1933). In response to a query on loneliness and emptiness in the painting, Hopper said that he "didn't see it as particularly lonely". He said: "Unconsciously, probably, I was painting the loneliness of a large city."

=== Josephine Hopper's notes on the painting ===
Starting shortly after their marriage in 1924, Edward Hopper and his wife Josephine (Jo) kept a journal in which he would use a pencil, make a sketch-drawing of each of his paintings, along with a detailed description of specific technical details. Jo Hopper would then add additional information about the theme of the painting.

A review of the page on which Nighthawks is entered shows (in Edward Hopper's handwriting) that the intended name of the work was actually Night Hawks and that the painting was completed on January 21, 1942.

Jo's handwritten notes about the painting give considerably more detail, including the possibility that the painting's title may have had its origins as a reference to the beak-shaped nose of the man at the counter or that the appearance of one of the "nighthawks" was tweaked to relate to the original meaning of the word:

Night + brilliant interior of cheap restaurant. Bright items: cherry wood counter + tops of surrounding stools; light on metal tanks at rear right; brilliant streak of jade green tiles 3/4 across canvas—at base of glass of window curving at corner. Light walls, dull yellow ocre [sic] door into kitchen right. Very good looking blond boy in white (coat, cap) inside counter. Girl in red blouse, brown hair eating sandwich. Man night hawk (beak) in dark suit, steel grey hat, black band, blue shirt (clean) holding cigarette. Other figure dark sinister back—at left. Light side walk outside pale greenish. Darkish red brick houses opposite. Sign across top of restaurant, dark—Phillies 5¢ cigar. Picture of cigar. Outside of shop dark, green. Note: bit of bright ceiling inside shop against dark of outside street—at edge of stretch of top of window.

In January 1942, Jo confirmed her preference for the name. In a letter to Edward's sister, Marion, she wrote, "Ed has just finished a very fine picture—a lunch counter at night with 3 figures. Night Hawks would be a fine name for it. E. posed for the two men in a mirror and I for the girl. He was about a month and half working on it."

== Ownership history ==
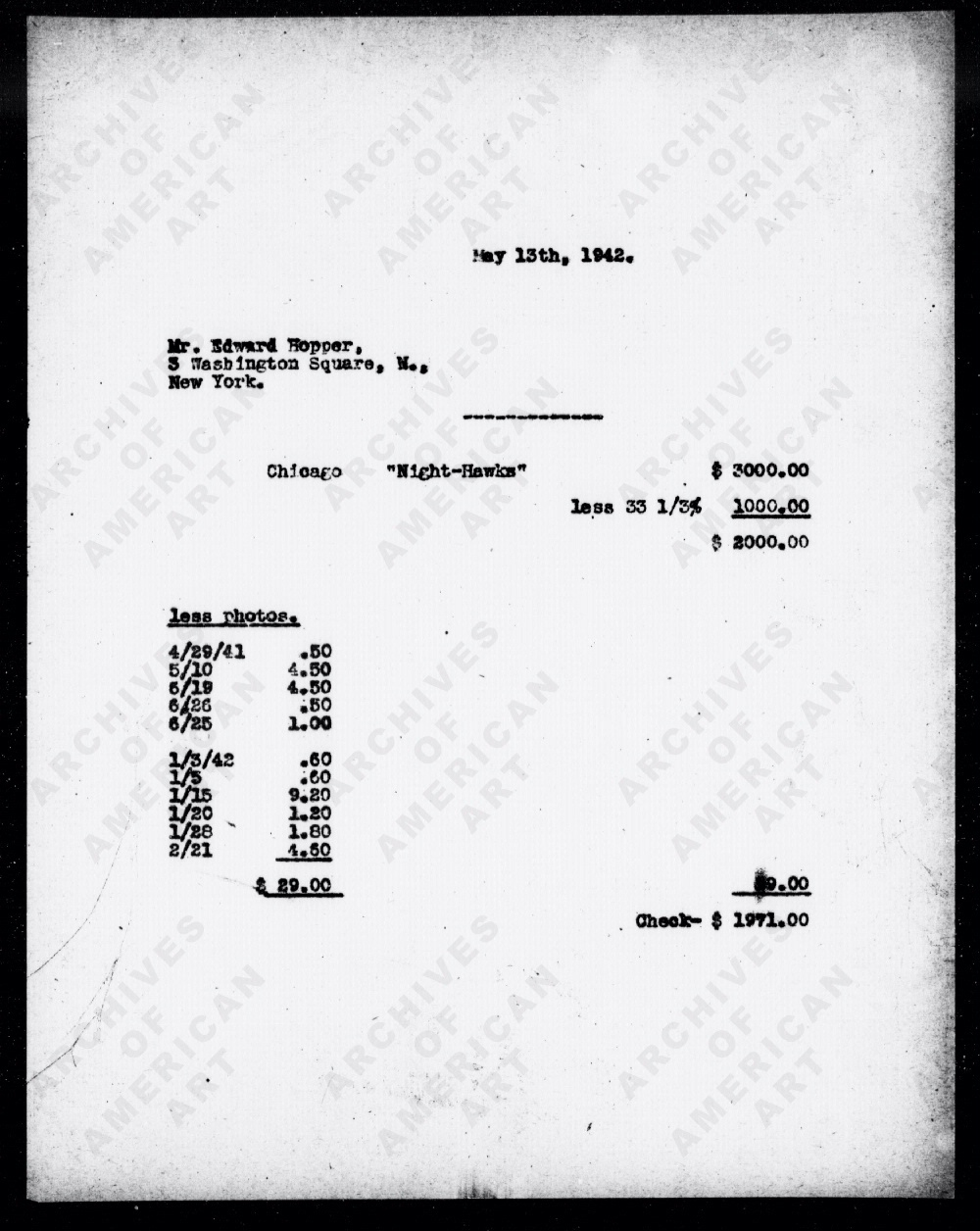
Invoice showing $1,971 (equivalent to $38,840 in 2025) going to the artist after commission and costs

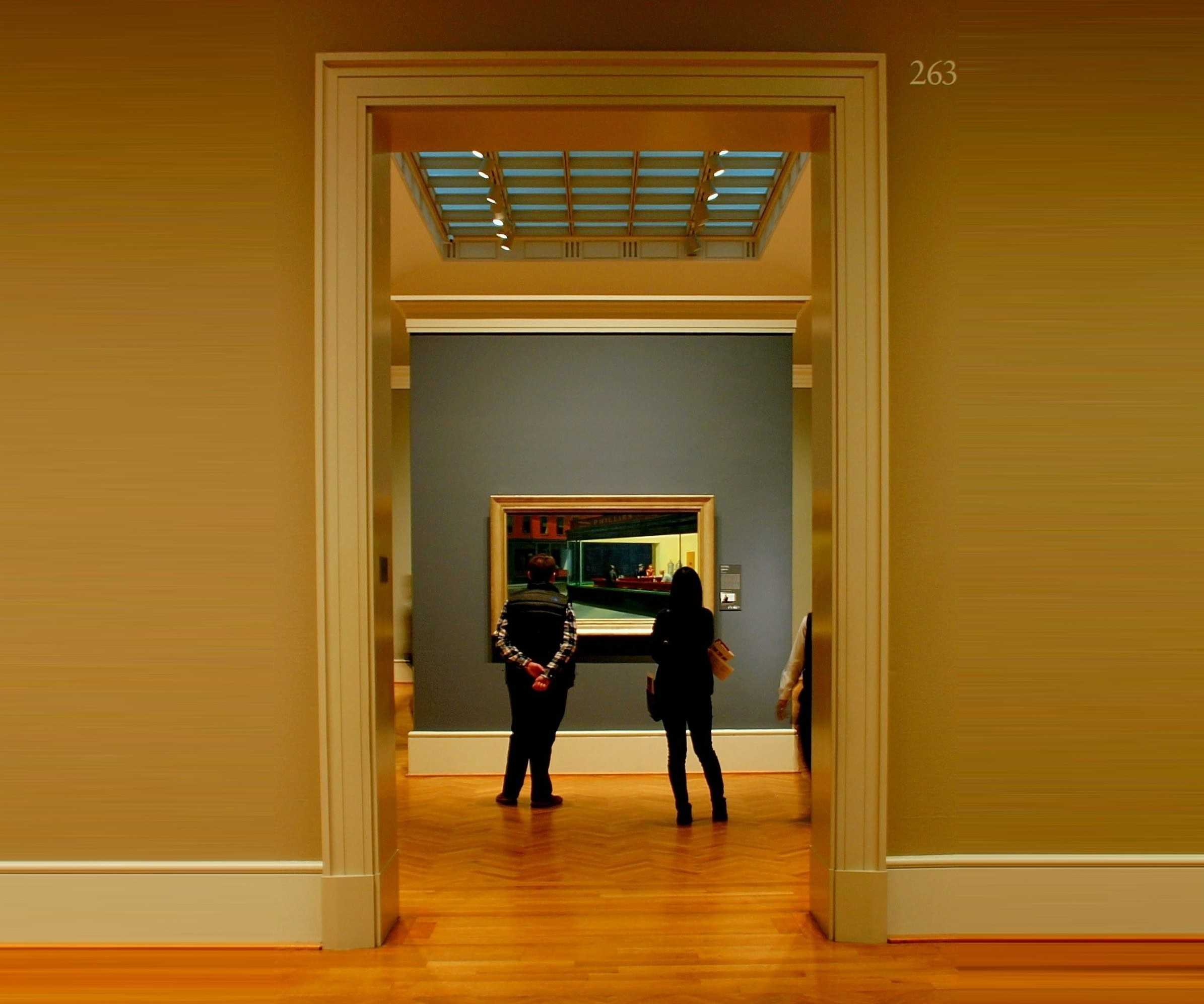
Nighthawks in the Art Institute of Chicago (2016)

Upon completing the canvas in the late winter of 1941–42, Hopper placed it on display at Rehn's, the gallery at which his paintings were normally placed for sale. It remained there for about a month. On St. Patrick's Day, Edward and Jo Hopper attended the opening of an exhibit of the paintings of Henri Rousseau at New York's Museum of Modern Art, which had been organized by Daniel Catton Rich, the director of the Art Institute of Chicago. Rich was in attendance, along with Alfred Barr, the Museum of Modern Art director. Barr spoke enthusiastically of Gas, which Hopper had painted a year earlier, and "Jo told him he just had to go to Rehn's to see Nighthawks. In the event, it was Rich who went, pronounced Nighthawks 'fine as a [Winslow] Homer', and soon arranged its purchase for Chicago." It was sold on May 13, 1942, for $3,000 (equivalent to $59,110 in 2025).

== Location of the restaurant ==
The scene was supposedly inspired by a diner (since demolished) in Greenwich Village, Hopper's neighborhood in Manhattan. Hopper himself said the painting "was suggested by a restaurant on Greenwich Avenue where two streets meet". Additionally, he noted that "I simplified the scene a great deal and made the restaurant bigger."

That reference led Hopper fans to engage in a search for the location of the original diner. The inspiration for the search was summed up in a 2010 blog of one of those searchers: "I am finding it extremely difficult to let go of the notion that the Nighthawks diner was a real diner, and not a total composite built of grocery stores, hamburger joints, and bakeries all cobbled together in the painter's imagination".

The spot often associated with the former location was a vacant lot known as Mulry Square, at the intersection of Seventh Avenue South, Greenwich Avenue, and West 11th Street, about seven blocks west of Hopper's studio on Washington Square. However, according to an article by Jeremiah Moss in The New York Times, that cannot be the location of the diner that inspired the painting because a gas station occupied that lot from the 1930s to the 1970s.

Moss located a land-use map in a 1950s municipal atlas showing that "Sometime between the late '30s and early '50s, a new diner appeared near Mulry Square". The diner was located immediately to the right of the gas station, "not in the empty northern lot, but on the southwest side, where Perry Street slants". That map is not reproduced in the Times article but is shown on Moss's blog.

Moss decided that Hopper should be taken at his word: the painting was merely "suggested" by a real-life restaurant, he had "simplified the scene a great deal", and he "made the restaurant bigger". In short, there probably never was a single real-life scene identical to the one that Hopper had created, and if one did exist, there is no longer sufficient evidence to pin down the precise location. Moss concluded, "the ultimate truth remains bitterly out of reach".

== In popular culture ==
Roger Brown's Puerto Rican Wedding (1969). Brown said the café in the lower left corner of this painting "isn't set up like an imitation of Nighthawks, but still refers to it very much."

Because it is so widely recognized, the diner scene in Nighthawks has served as the model for many homages and parodies.

=== Painting and sculpture ===
Many artists have produced works that allude to or respond to Nighthawks.

Hopper influenced the Photorealists of the late 1960s and early 70s, including Ralph Goings, who evoked Nighthawks in several paintings of diners. Richard Estes painted a corner store in People's Flowers (1971), but in daylight, with the shop's large window reflecting the street and sky.

More direct visual quotations began to appear in the 1970s. Gottfried Helnwein's painting Boulevard of Broken Dreams (1984) replaces the three patrons with American pop culture icons Humphrey Bogart, Marilyn Monroe, and James Dean, and the attendant with Elvis Presley. According to Hopper scholar Gail Levin, Helnwein connected the bleak mood of Nighthawks with 1950s American cinema and with "the tragic fate of the decade's best-loved celebrities." Nighthawks Revisited, a 1980 parody by Red Grooms, clutters the street scene with pedestrians, cats, and trash. A 2005 Banksy parody shows a fat, shirtless soccer hooligan in Union Flag boxers standing inebriated outside the diner, apparently having just smashed the diner window with a nearby chair. A large mural recreation of Nighthawks was painted on a defunct Chinese restaurant in Santa Rosa, California until the building was demolished in 2019.

=== Literature ===
Several writers have explored how the customers in Nighthawks came to be in a diner at night, or what will happen next. Wolf Wondratschek's poem "Nighthawks: After Edward Hopper's Painting" imagines the man and woman sitting together in the diner as an estranged couple: "I bet she wrote him a letter/ Whatever it said, he's no longer the man / Who'd read her letters twice." Joyce Carol Oates wrote interior monologues for the figures in the painting in her poem "Edward Hopper's Nighthawks, 1942". A special issue of Der Spiegel included five brief dramatizations that built five different plots around the painting; one, by screenwriter Christoph Schlingensief, turned the scene into a chainsaw massacre. Michael Connelly, Erik Jendresen and Stuart Dybek wrote short stories inspired by this painting. John Koenig's The Dictionary of Obscure Sorrows references Hopper's painting under the entry for "nighthawk".

=== Film ===
Hopper was an avid moviegoer and critics have noted the resemblance of his paintings to film stills. Nighthawks and works such as Night Shadows (1921) anticipate the look of film noir, whose development Hopper may have influenced.

Hopper was an acknowledged influence on the film musical Pennies from Heaven (1981), for which production designer Ken Adam recreated Nighthawks as a set. Director Wim Wenders recreated Nighthawks as the set for a film-within-a-film in The End of Violence (1997). Wenders suggested that Hopper's paintings appeal to filmmakers because "You can always tell where the camera is." In Glengarry Glen Ross (1992), two characters visit a café resembling the diner in a scene that illustrates their solitude and despair. The painting was briefly used as a background for a scene in the animated film Heavy Traffic (1973) by director Ralph Bakshi.

Nighthawks influenced the "future noir" look of Blade Runner; director Ridley Scott said "I was constantly waving a reproduction of this painting under the noses of the production team to illustrate the look and mood I was after". In his review of the 1998 film Dark City, Roger Ebert noted the film had "store windows that owe something to Edward Hopper's Nighthawks." Hard Candy (2005) acknowledged a similar debt by setting one scene at a "Nighthawks Diner" where a character purchases a T-shirt with Nighthawks printed on it. The painting features in the 2009 movie Night at the Museum: Battle of the Smithsonian, it comes to life through CGI animation with the characters reacting to events in the outside world.

=== Music ===
- Tom Waits's album Nighthawks at the Diner (1975) features a title, a cover, and lyrics inspired by Nighthawks.
- The video for Voice of the Beehive's song "Monsters and Angels", from Honey Lingers, is set in a diner reminiscent of that in Nighthawks, with the band-members portraying waitstaff and patrons. The band's site said they "went with Edward Hopper's classic painting, Nighthawks, as a visual guide."
- Orchestral Manoeuvres in the Dark's 2013 single "Night Café" was influenced by Nighthawks and mentions Hopper by name. Seven of his paintings are referenced in the lyrics.
- The first movement of American Composer David Maslanka's multi-movement quartet for two pianos and two percussionists, This is the World, is entitled "Nighthawks" and takes its inspiration from Hopper's painting.

=== Theatre and opera ===
- Jonathan Miller's 1982 production of Verdi's opera Rigoletto for English National Opera, set in 1950s New York, features one street setting with a bar inspired by the Nighthawks diner.

=== Television ===
An establishing shot from "Homer vs. the Eighteenth Amendment" (1997), one of several references to Nighthawks in the animated TV series The Simpsons

- Nighthawks plays a role in the American series Dark Matter (2024 TV series) episode 2.4
- The American series CSI: Crime Scene Investigation placed its characters in a version of the painting.
- The show Fresh Off the Boat Season 2 poster features the title family in Nighthawks with actress Constance Wu using chopsticks.
- The closing scene of Turner Classic Movies (TCM)'s “Open All Night” intro sequence, which was used to open overnight movie presentations from 1994 to 2021, is based on Nighthawks.
- The American series Shameless features the Nighthawks painting in a late season 11 arc where Frank Gallagher, a petty criminal and conman, pulls off his final heist, stealing the painting and hiding it in his basement, with a visiting repairman later thinking it was a high quality replica.
- In a season 1 episode of That '70s Show, Red and Kitty Forman, after a failed attempt to dine at an upscale restaurant, end up back at their usual diner. After Kitty comments that the scene seems familiar, the camera pulls back to reveal them as the couple seated at the counter in the painting.
- This work was featured on 100 Great Paintings.

=== Parodies ===
Nighthawks has been widely referenced and parodied. Versions of it have appeared on posters, T-shirts and greeting cards as well as in comic books and advertisements. Typically, these parodies—like Helnwein's Boulevard of Broken Dreams, which became a popular poster—retain the diner and highly recognizable diagonal composition, but replace the patrons and attendant with other characters: animals, Santa Claus and his reindeer, or the respective casts of The Adventures of Tintin or Peanuts.

One parody of Nighthawks even inspired a parody of its own. Michael Bedard's painting Window Shopping (1989), part of his Sitting Ducks series of posters, replaces the figures in the diner with ducks and shows a crocodile outside eying the ducks in anticipation. Poverino Peppino parodied this image in Boulevard of Broken Ducks (1993), in which a contented crocodile lies on the counter while four ducks stand outside in the rain.

== See also ==
- List of works by Edward Hopper
- 100 Great Paintings, 1980 BBC series

== Bibliography ==
- Cook, Greg, "Visions of Isolation: Edward Hopper at the MFA", Boston Phoenix, May 4, 2007, p. 22, Arts and Entertainment.
- Spring, Justin, The Essential Edward Hopper, Wonderland Press, 1998
