= Franklin High School (Portland, Oregon) =

Benjamin Franklin High School

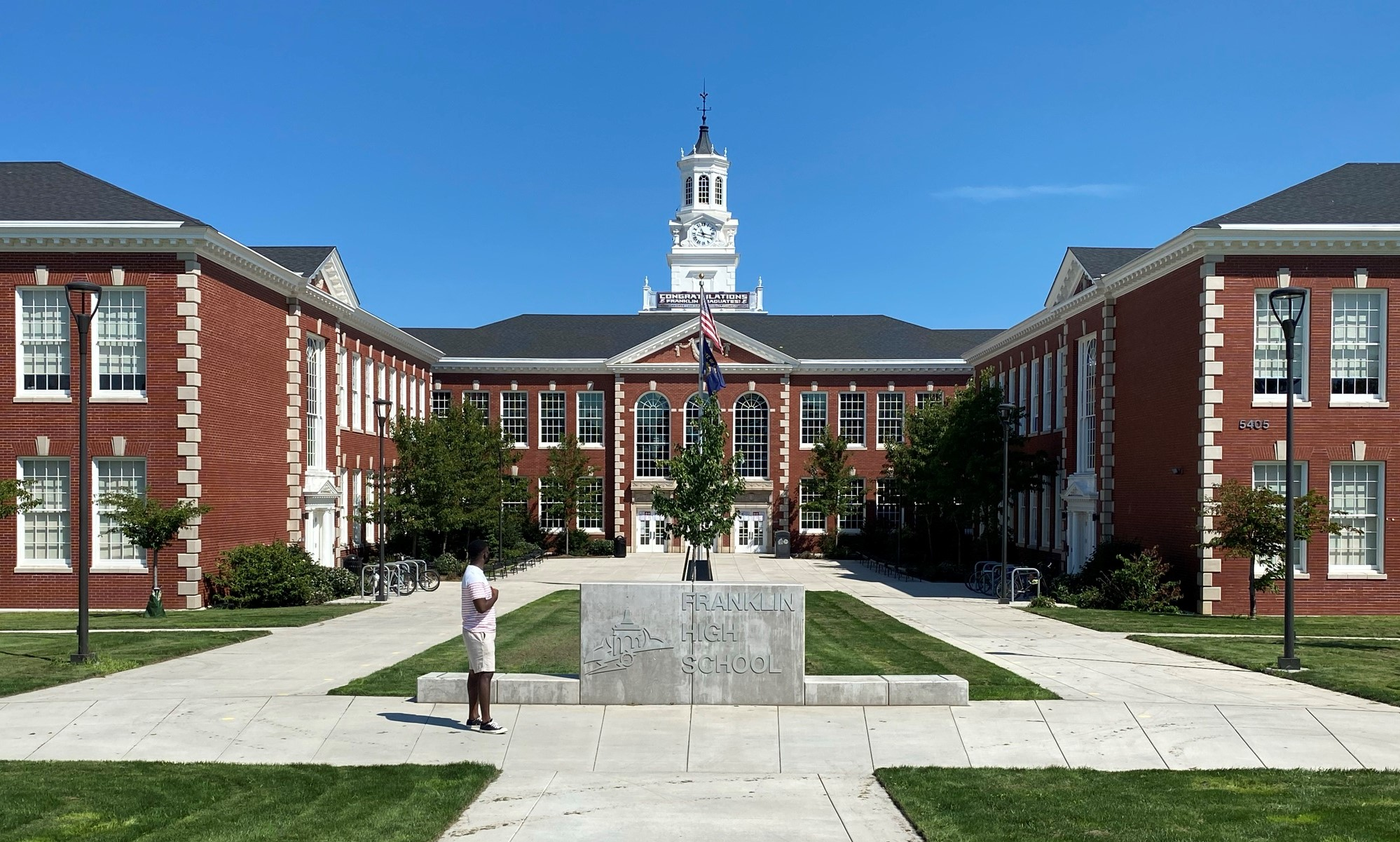
- Franklin High School's main south entry in 2021

Location
- 5405 SE Woodward Street; Portland, Oregon 97206; United States; 45.502136°N 122.606896°W

Information
- Type: Public
- Opened: 1914
- School district: Portland Public Schools
- Principal: Zulema Naegele
- Teaching staff: 98.12 (FTE)
- Enrollment: 1,807 (2024-2025)
- Student to teacher ratio: 18.42
- Colors: Maroon and grey
- Athletics conference: OSAA Portland Interscholastic League 6A-1
- Mascot: Lightning
- Rival: Cleveland High School
- Newspaper: The Franklin Post
- Feeder schools: Bridger-Creative Science School, Harrison Park Middle School, Hosford Middle School, Kellogg Middle School, Lane Middle School, Mt. Tabor Middle School, Sunnyside-Environmental School
- Website: franklin.pps.net

Franklin High School (FHS, formally Benjamin Franklin High School) is a public high school in Portland, Oregon, United States. It is located in central southeast Portland in the South Tabor neighborhood. It is the second largest high school in the Portland Public School District. Its attendance boundary is expansive, with six middle schools feeding into it and covering a large portion of Southeast Portland, specifically the neighborhoods of Mt. Tabor, Lents, Mt. Scott-Arleta, Brentwood-Darlington, Sunnyside, and Richmond.

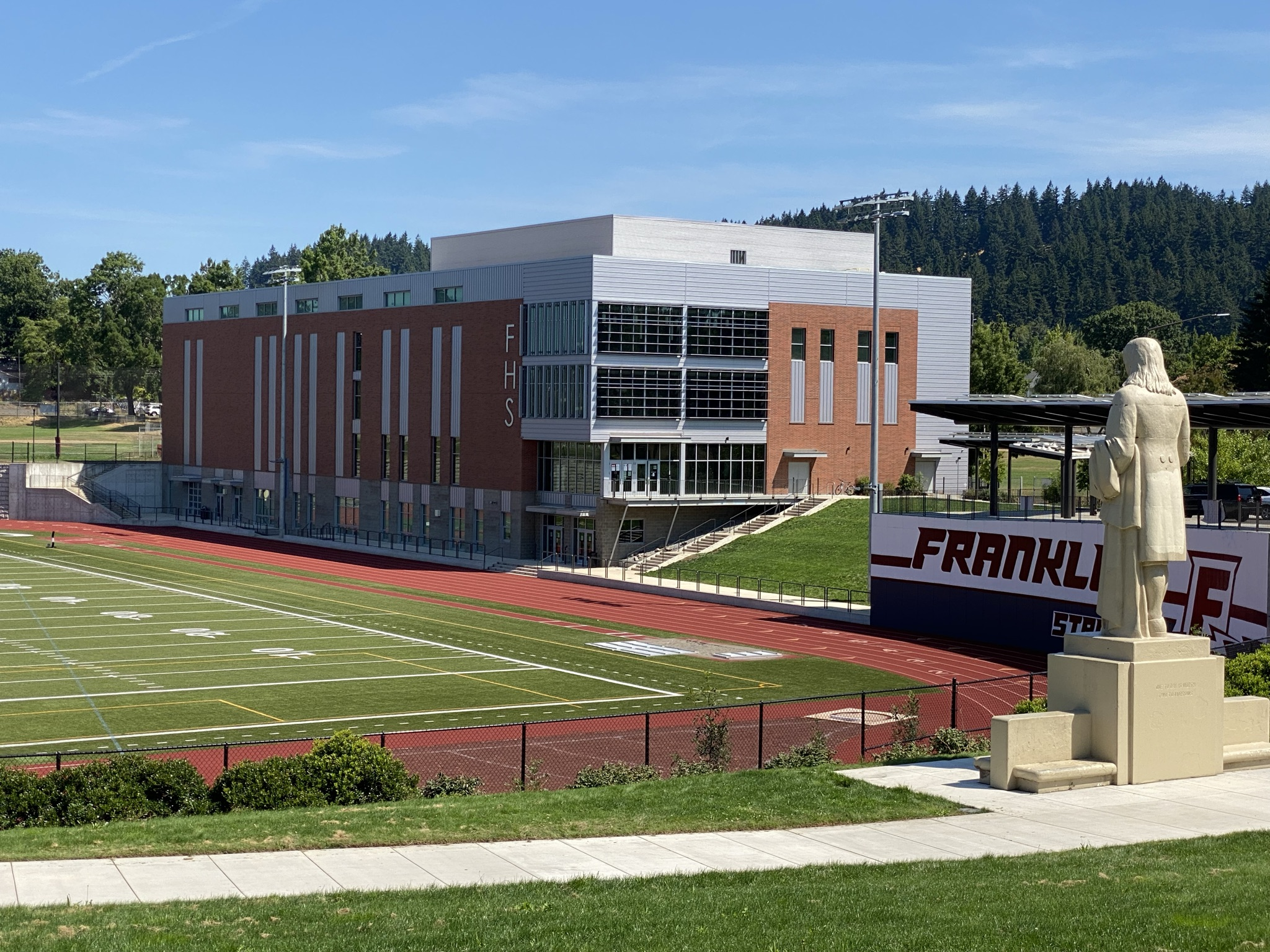
Franklin High School, athletic wing from the north portico in 2021

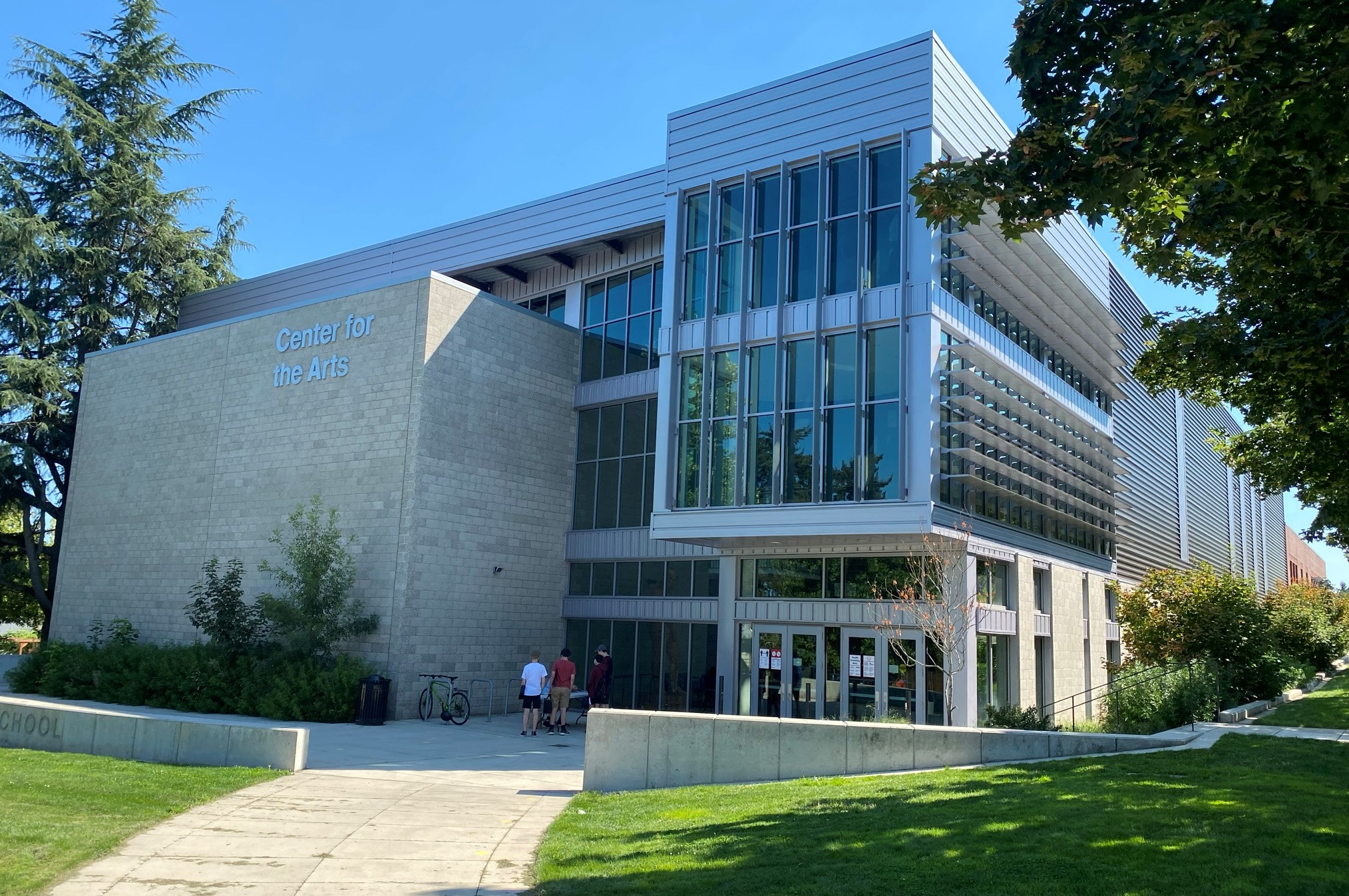
Franklin High School, performing arts wing in 2021

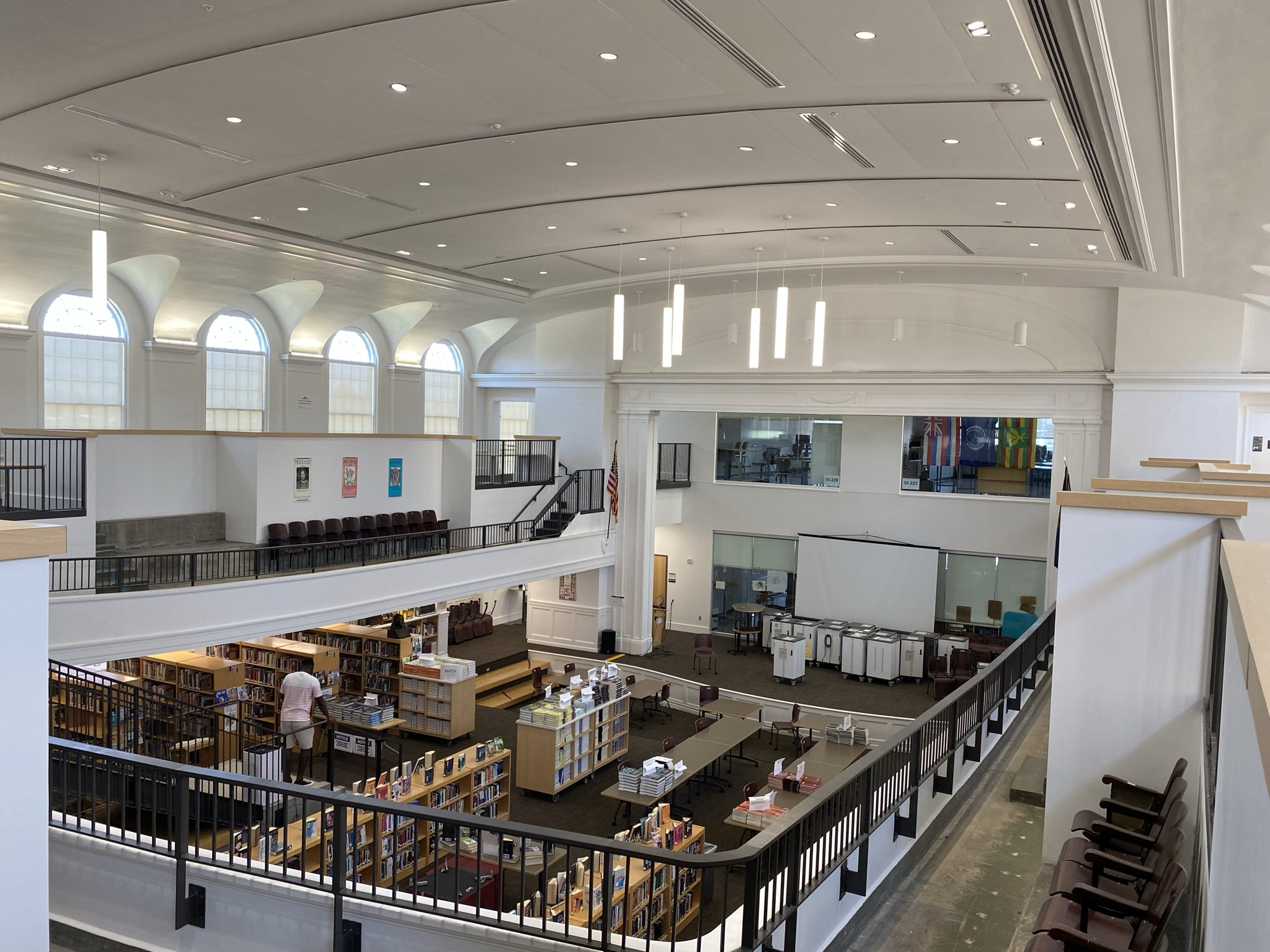
Franklin High School, new library in former auditorium

== History ==
Founded in 1914, Franklin is Portland's fourth high school. The city's high schools were filled to capacity at the time, and the population in southeast Portland was rapidly growing. It was initially founded in part of the Creston Elementary School, with nine instructors and 115 students in the spring 1914 semester. The current building, designed by Floyd Naramore, opened in September 1917.

In 1942, a statue of Benjamin Franklin, after whom the school was named, was installed outside of Franklin High School.

Due to the baby boom and the passing of a $25 million building levy by the school district in 1947, a new addition for arts, industrial arts, and home economics departments was slated.

In October 2010 the school decided to discontinue its competitive robotics team due to the lack of any school official sanctioning the team, allegedly by locking the team out of their workspace without access to their tools, or the more than $7000 the team had raised to sustain the program. The team had been a part of the school for seven years.

Between 2015 and 2017, the school was modernized and expanded, with funding from a $482 million bond measure in 2012. The modernization included a new arts center, a new gym, biomedical, and culinary arts building, seismic retrofitting, and a new entrance.

== Student profile ==
In the 2017–2018 school year, Franklin's student population was 48.9% White, 20.5% Hispanic, 16.4% Asian, 5.6% African American, 0.6% Pacific Islander, 0.6% Native American, and 7.4% mixed race.

In 2008, 80% of the school's seniors received a high school diploma. Of 354 students, 282 graduated, 52 dropped out, five received a modified diploma, and 15 were still in high school the following year. In 2009, 31% of the students were transfers into the school.

== Athletics ==
Franklin High School athletic teams compete in the OSAA 6A-1 Portland Interscholastic League, the highest division and league in the OSAA.

=== State championships ===
- Boys Basketball: 1921, 1956, 1959
- Boys Cross Country: 2019, 2023
- Boys Soccer: 2019
- Boys Track and Field: 1929

== Notable alumni ==
- Robin Reed, US Olympic Gold Medalist wrestling 1924
- Bob Amsberry, actor on The Mickey Mouse Club
- Douglas Engelbart, inventor of the computer mouse
- Tamara Fazzolari, Miss Oregon 1987
- Vic Gilliam, Oregon State Representative from the 18th District
- Chris Gorsek, Oregon State Representative from the 49th District
- Betty Evans Grayson, softball pitcher, nicknamed "Bullet Betty"
- Howard Hobson, head men's basketball coach at the University of Oregon (1936–47); led the team to the first NCAA Men's Division I Basketball Championship in 1939
- Steve "Snapper" Jones, former basketball player in the ABA and NBA; color analyst for Portland Trail Blazers broadcasts
- Jack Landau, Oregon Supreme Court Justice
- Gerald Mahan, physicist and member of the National Academy of Sciences
- Rod Monroe, Oregon State Senator from the 24th District
- Legedu Naanee, former NFL player
- Claire Phillips, spy in the Japanese-occupied Philippines during World War II; recipient of the Medal of Freedom
- Johnnie Ray, singer
- Francis L. Sampson, 12th Chief of Chaplains of the United States Army
- Shoni Schimmel, WNBA player with the Atlanta Dream
- Melvin Storer, United States Navy shipfitter
- Richard Unis, Oregon Supreme Court Justice
- Denorval Unthank Jr., architect and University of Oregon Faculty member
