= Thomas Maurice Mulry =

American businessman and philanthropist

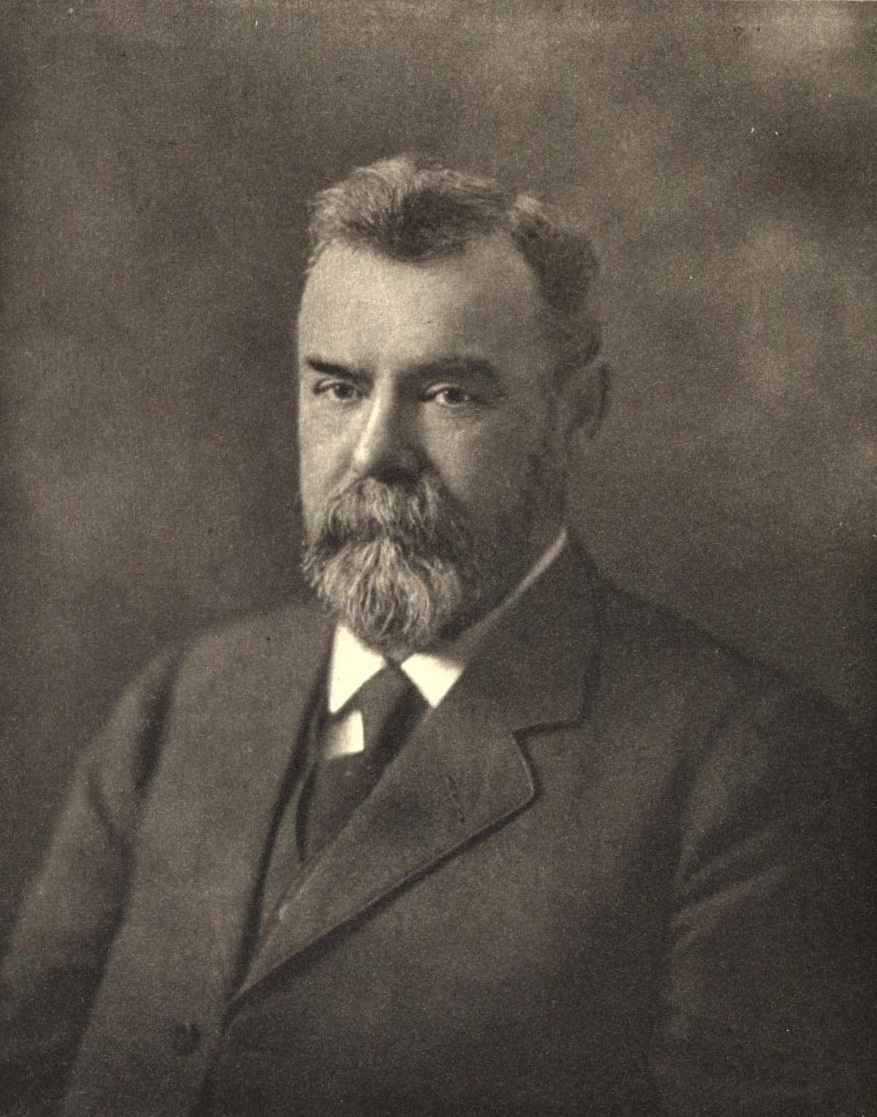
Thomas Maurice Mulry.

Thomas Maurice Mulry (February 13, 1855 – March 10, 1916) was an American businessman and philanthropist.

== Biography ==
Mulry was born in New York City, the son of Thomas Mulry and Parthenia Crolius. His early school-days were spent in St. Joseph's parochial school and then at De La Salle Academy. In 1874, he joined the St. Vincent de Paul Society, an international organization of Catholic laymen dedicated to helping the poor. A successful businessman and banker, he devoted extensive time and resources to charitable work. On October 6, 1880, he was married to Mary E. Gallagher and they set up a home in Greenwich Village. Mulry became a director and for ten years president of the Emigrant Industrial Saving Bank, the largest institution of its type in the world. He was also a director of the Mutual License Insurance Company and served for many years on the General Committee of Tammany Hall.

In 1899, Mulry was named Chair to the National Conference of Charities and Correction (NCCC)'s committee on dependent and neglected children and was the interim president of the Catholic Home Bureau. His NCCC committee report in 1899 that first publicly acknowledged foster care as a workable alternative to orphanages for childcare marked a stark departure from early Catholic leaders' insistence for orphanages as the superior option for child care. This softened response signaled a growing acceptance of foster care as an alternative in light of growing opposition to existing practices.

Mulry's charitable activities led President Theodore Roosevelt to name him vice-chairman and presiding officer of the first White House Conference on the Care of Dependent Children in 1909.

=== Private life ===
Mulry was an old-fashioned man. His manners and tendencies, which reflect those from another time, transcend time and remind us of days before. We see in his character, a love of the truth, simplicity, and personal betterment. Born February 13, 1855, Mulry was born to Irish immigrant Thomas Mulry and Parthenia Crolius as the second of fourteen children. Some time away from the city in Pleasant Prairie, Wisconsin, ended Mulry's formal schooling. Ambitious as he was, Thomas pursued knowledge in other ways. Night classes at Cooper Institute supplemented his earlier education, and opened the door for his interests in sociological elements of the world. Thomas Maurice Mulry was wedded to Mary E. Gallagher on October 6, 1880 – the beginning of the Progressive era. This is where we see Mr. Mulry's awakening to the squalid conditions of those around him in Greenwich Village, where he resided. Contact with those living in miserable, impoverished conditions was quite often. Years after having children – most of whom joined religious orders after growing up in a staunchly Catholic home and environment – Mulry began work as a member of the Superior Council of New York. While working hard at his business, he still managed to find time to offer his services to this society. At this point in time, social and professional philanthropy was becoming “fad-like”. Mulry's practical experience with the poor, along with his deeply held progressive ideologies, made him an asset to anyone looking for philanthropic opportunities. Fortunately, for those touched by his goodness, Mulry's work introduced him to a handful of men who were invested in philanthropy and wanted to utilize Mulry's expertise. These good works did not remain quiet. Word broke out about his care and efforts to aid neglected children, the mentally ill, and private charities. Quickly, there was an outpouring of requests for Mulry to speak at formal events, and address America's philanthropists. This propelled his efforts even further, and he soon led the charge in growing Catholic charities and in training professionals in social work.

== Honors ==
Mulry received an honorary doctorate of Laws from the Catholic University of America and a designation as a Knight of St. Gregory by Pope Pius X. In 1912, he was awarded the Laetare Medal by the University of Notre Dame.

Mulry Square in Greenwich Village is named in his honor.
