= Winter Fields (painting) =

1942 painting by Andrew Wyeth

- Artist: Andrew Wyeth
- Year: 1942
- Type: Tempera on composition board
- Dimensions: 44 cm × 104.1 cm (17 5/16 in × 41 in)
- Location: Whitney Museum of American Art; New York

Winter Fields is a 1942 painting by the American artist Andrew Wyeth. It depicts a dead, frozen crow in a landscape with fields and distant farm buildings. The painting is hosted at the Whitney Museum of American Art, in New York.

== History and analysis ==
Wyeth had found the crow near his home in Chadds Ford, Pennsylvania and brought it to his studio where he painted it in detail. It was painted with tempera on composition board.

Because it was made during World War II, the painting has often been interpreted as an allusion to the ongoing battles. It has also been seen as an allusion to battles during the American Revolutionary War that took place in Brandywine Valley of Pennsylvania, as Wyeth was known for his interest in local history.

== Reception ==
In 2011, Ken Johnson of The New York Times reviewed an exhibition where Winter Fields was included, and wrote about a recurring theme in 20th-century art of declining spirituality: "Winter Fields, a painting that Andrew Wyeth made in 1942 when he was leaning toward Magic Realism, puts it more succinctly. With the exacting touch and the pagan religiosity of a Pre-Raphaelite, he pictured a dead crow among dry, brown grasses, a baleful symbol for civilization at war with itself, a silent scream against the violent idiocy of man."
