= Free America Walkout =

2026 protest

- Part of Protests against the second presidency of Donald Trump
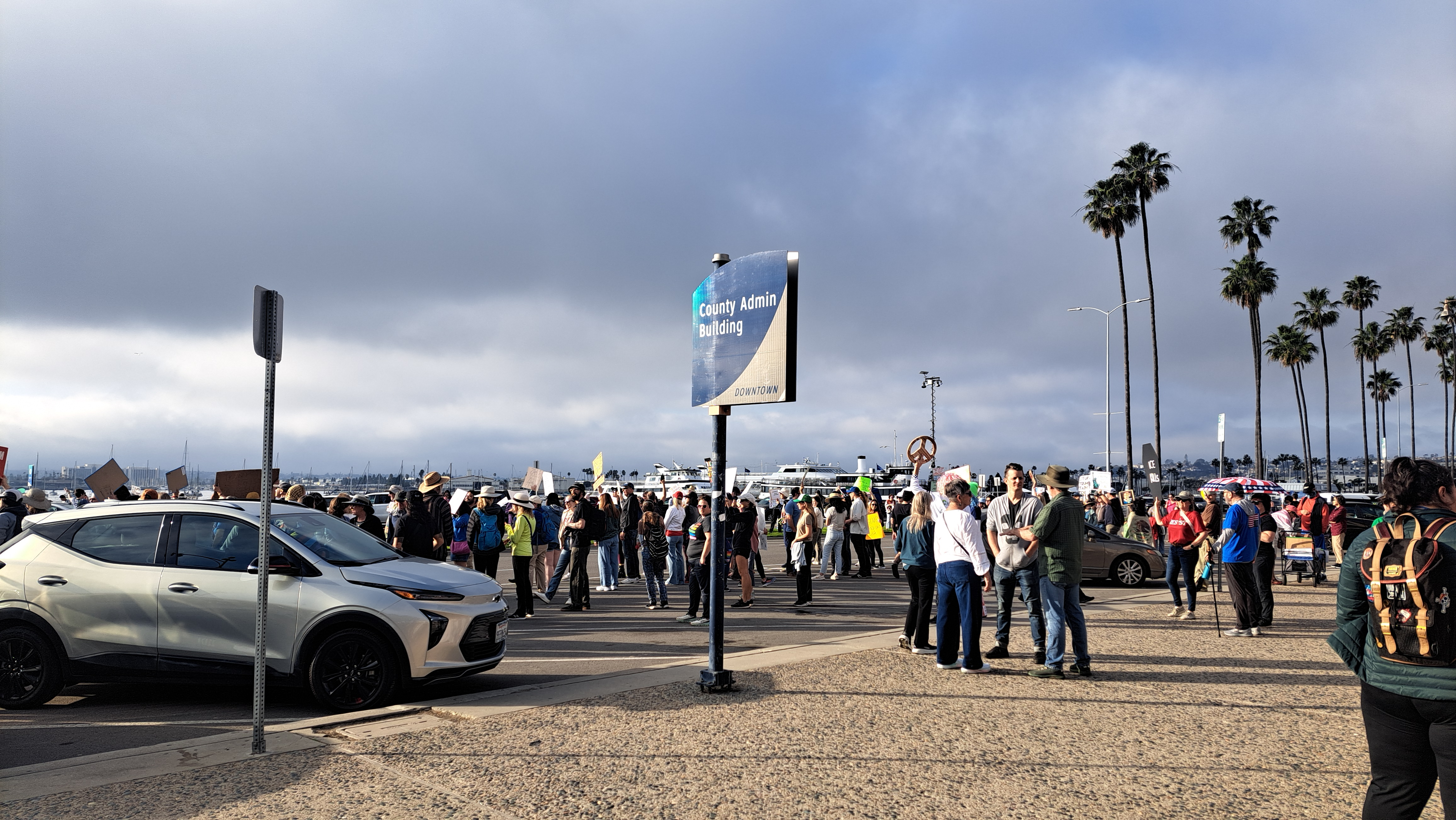
- Protesters at Waterfront Park in San Diego, California
- Date: January 20, 2026
- Location: Various locations in the United States and abroad

The Free America Walkout was a demonstration held on January 20, 2026. It was organized by Women's March, with support from other organizations such as 50501 and FEMINIST. Approximately 450 activities were planned in all 50 U.S. states, as well as in Canada, France, Italy, and the Netherlands.

Participants were encouraged to wear red, white, and blue. American University sociologist Dana R. Fisher planned to collect and assess data on participation.

== Locations ==
Activities were planned in the following U.S. cities:

- Ann Arbor, Michigan
- Asheville, North Carolina
- Augusta, Maine
- Bloomington, Indiana
- Boise, Idaho
- Bozeman, Montana
- Carson City, Nevada
- Concord, New Hampshire
- Cumberland, Maryland
- Grand Rapids, Michigan
- Knoxville, Tennessee
- Marana, Arizona
- Morgantown, West Virginia
- Norman, Oklahoma
- Oklahoma City
- Rockford, Illinois
- Salt Lake City
- Summerville, South Carolina
- Tucson, Arizona
- Tuscaloosa, Alabama
- Washington, D.C.
- Wausau, Wisconsin
- West Hartford, Connecticut
- Wilmington, North Carolina
- Wilkes-Barre, Pennsylvania

Outside the U.S., events were also planned in Canada, France, Italy, and the Netherlands.

=== California ===
Activities were planned in the following cities in California:

- Bellflower
- Brea
- Burbank
- Encinitas
- Escondido
- Fontana
- Garden Grove
- Goleta
- Ladera Ranch
- Long Beach
- Los Angeles
- Lynnwood
- Montebello
- Pasadena
- Ontario
- Orange
- Oxnard
- Riverside
- San Diego
- Santa Barbara
- Sierra Madre
- Temecula
- Torrance
- Thousand Oaks
- Ventura
- Victorville

In Central Coast, students held protests at Aptos, Hollister, and Salinas High Schools. There were dozens of rallies in Southern California. The Chico event is supported by the Defenders of Democracy Coalition, Re-Sisters, and local chapters of Indivisible and Women's March. Hundreds of people gathered in downtown Los Angeles and in Pasadena. Multiple demonstrations were planned in the San Francisco Bay Area, including in Oakland and San Jose. Hundreds participated in San Francisco. Protests were also planned in Napa, Santa Rosa, and South Lake Tahoe. Hundreds gathered in front of the San Diego County Administrative Building.

=== Colorado ===
Colorado saw protests in Boulder, Denver, and Louisville.

=== Connecticut ===
In Connecticut, activities were planned in Bridgeport, Canton, Granby, Hartford, New Milford, Newtown, West Hartford, and Windsor. Hundreds of people participated.

=== Florida ===
In Florida, activities were planned in 28 cities, including Palm Coast. Approximately two dozen protesters gathered outside of Rep. Carlos A. Giménez's office in Miami-Dade County. Two rallies were planned in The Villages. About 100 people rallied outside Tampa City Hall. More protests were held in Lakeland, St. Petersburg, Gulfport and Zephyrhills.

=== Georgia ===
In Georgia, students at twelve high schools and colleges, including Emory University and Kennesaw State University, plan to participate.

=== Iowa ===
Iowa saw protests in Cedar Rapids, Des Moines, Grinnell, Iowa City, and Sioux City.

=== Massachusetts ===
In Massachusetts, activities were planned in Canton, Marshfield, Plymouth, Quincy, Rockland, and Weymouth.

=== New York ===
Multiple events were planned in New York City. Protesters gathered in Binghamton.

=== Ohio ===
In Ohio, activities were planned in Akron, Bowling Green, Columbus, Dayton, and Fremont.

=== Oregon ===
Multiple events are planned in Oregon. In Portland, activities are being held at Couch Park in northwest Portland, at Lewis & Clark College, at The Fields Park in the Pearl District, in southeast Portland, and in southwest Portland. Protesters marched from Couch Park to the KGW studios "to show support for local journalism". Elsewhere in the Portland metropolitan area, events are planned in Beaverton and Sherwood/Tigard.

Elsewhere in Oregon, events were planned in Albany, Bend, Roseburg, and St. Helens. Hundreds participated in Eugene.

=== Texas ===
Four events were planned in El Paso. An event was held in Houston.

The San Antonio event was organized by local chapters of Indivisible and the Party for Socialism and Liberation. Protesters gathered outside City Hall.

=== Virginia ===
In Virginia, activities were planned in Clifton Forge, Culpeper, Floyd, Richmond, and Williamsburg.

=== Washington ===
In Seattle, protesters planned to march from Seattle Central College to Pier 58 via Broadway. Approximately 200 people gathered in Bellingham. There was also a demonstration in Olympia. In Southwest Washington, multiple events were planned in Vancouver.

== See also ==
- Protests against the second Trump administration
