= John H. Couch (sidewheeler) =

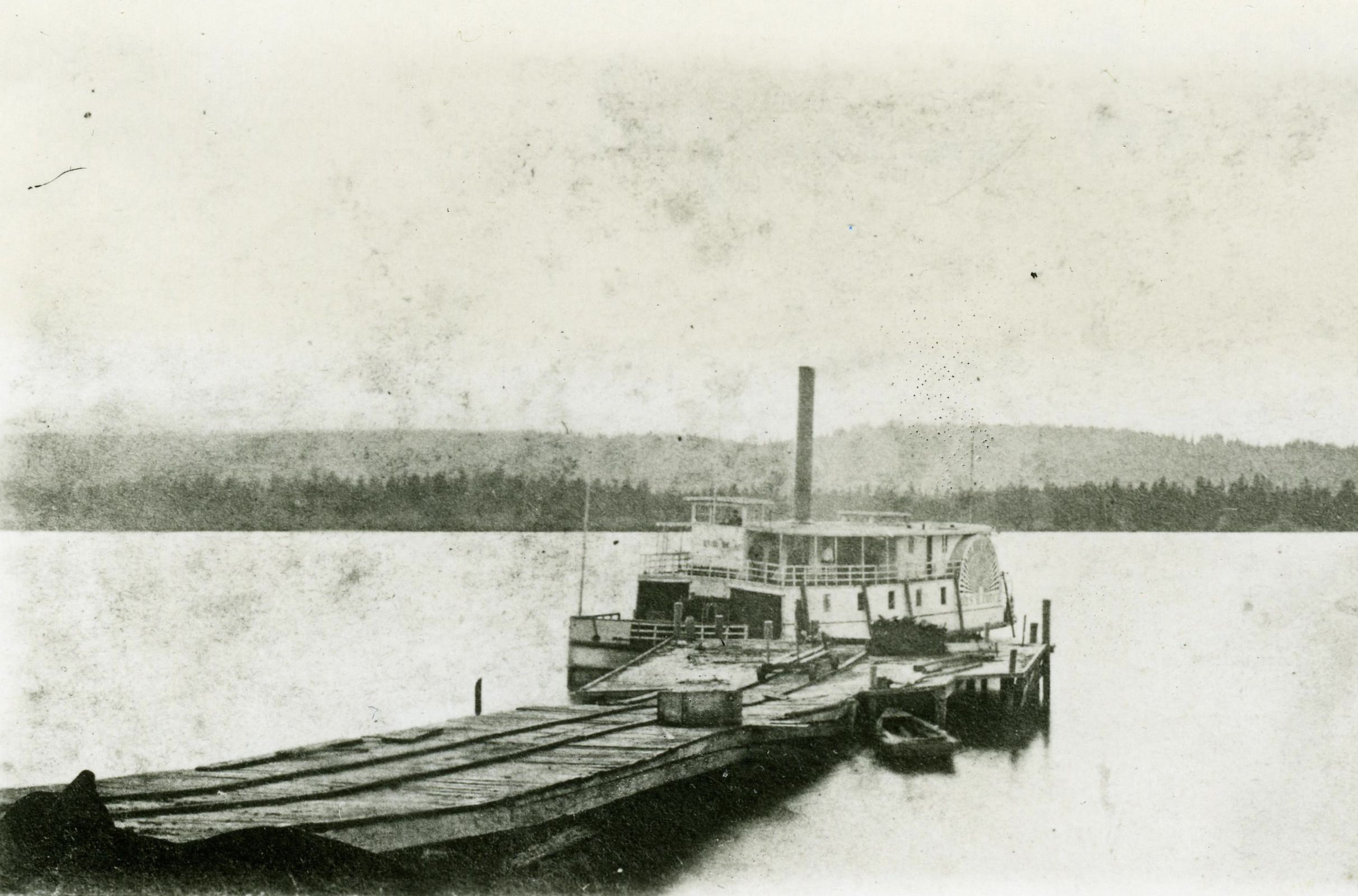
- Steamer John H. Couch sometime between 1863 and 1870.

History
- Route: Willamette and Columbia rivers
- Builder: John Bruce
- Identification: U.S. # 13622
- Fate: Dismantled

General characteristics
- Class & type: riverine all-purpose
- Tonnage: 255.24 gross register tons
- Length: 122 ft (37.2 m)
- Beam: 21 ft (6.4 m) over hull (exclusive of guards).
- Installed power: steam engines, with bore of 14.375 in (365.1 mm) and stroke of 54 ft (16.46 m).
- Propulsion: side-wheels

John H. Couch was a side-wheel driven steamboat that operated on the Columbia and lower Willamette rivers from 1863 to 1873. Informally the vessel was known as the Couch.

== Construction ==
John H. Couch was built at Westport, Oregon in 1863. The boat was named after a prominent seaman, John H. Couch, who was also Oregon's first inspector of hulls. The boat was built by Capt. Charles Holman, D. Huntington, and Capt. Oliff Olsen. Holman owned one-half of the boat, with the others holding a one-third and a one-sixth share, respectively.

The shipbuilder was John Bruce, of Astoria.

== Design, dimensions, and engineering ==
John H. Couch was a side-wheel driven vessel. It was built to run from Portland to Astoria, Oregon. The official merchant vessel registry number was 13622.

John H. Couch was 122 ft (37.2 m) long, with a beam of 21 ft (6.4 m), exclusive of the guards and the paddle-wheel housings. Gross tonnage was 255.24 tons. The engines had cylinders with an inside bore of 14 and three-eighths inches with a stroke of 54 inches.

== Operations ==
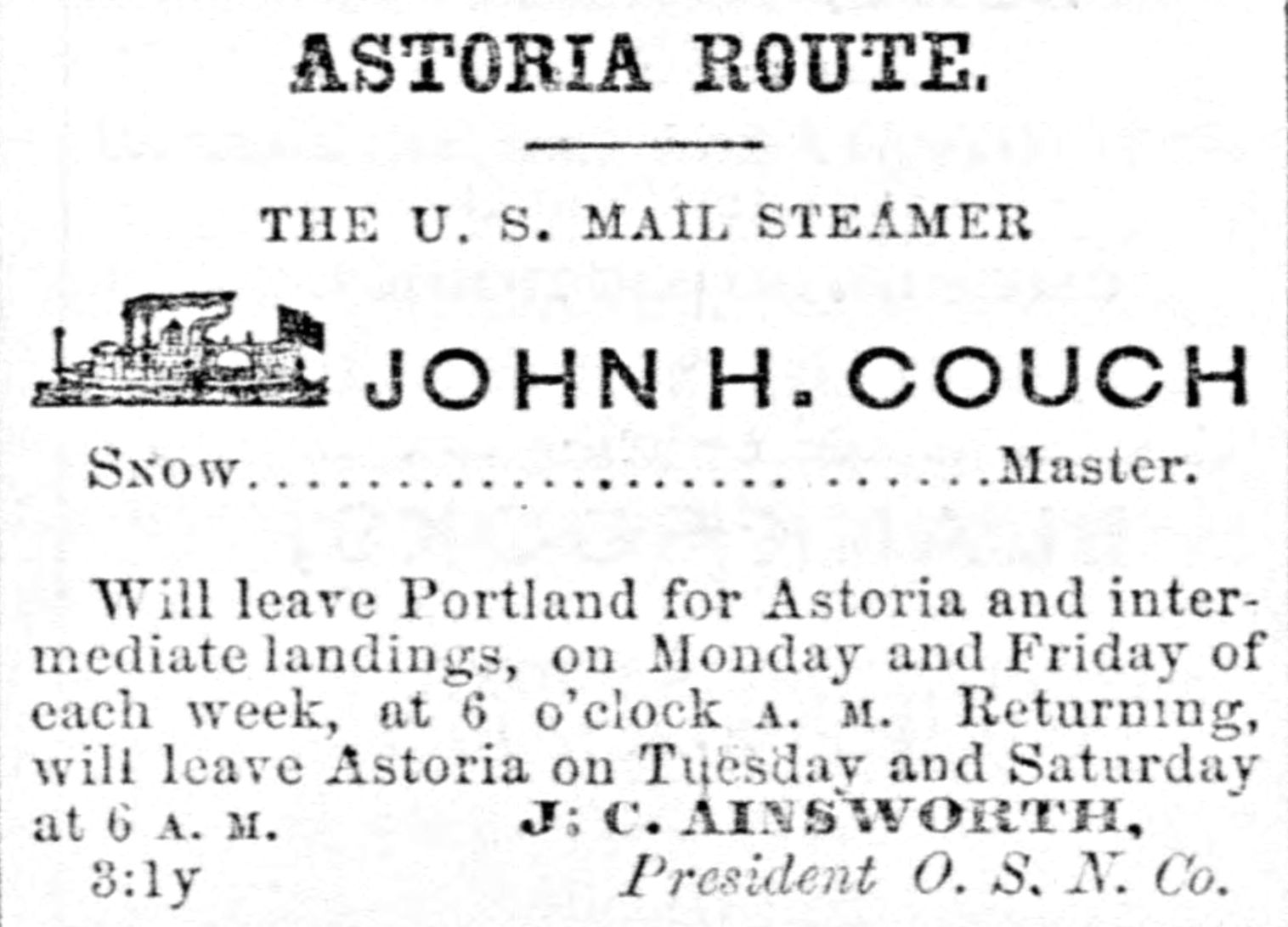
Advertisement for John H. Couch, November 10, 1866.

John H. Couch operated for a time in opposition to the dominant steamboat concern on the river, the Oregon Steam Navigation Company. O.S.N was running the steamer Julia against the Couch on the Astoria route.

In January 1865, O.S.N. bought the Couch, as well as the steamers Cowlitz (ex Swan) and Belle, which were also owned by Holman, Huntington, and Olsen. Once O.S.N. had the Couch, it withdrew Julia from the Astoria route.

O.S.N. kept the Couch on the Astoria run under Capt. J.O. Van Bergen, as master, with Richard Hoyt Jr. as purser. During summer, the boat was sometimes engaged in excursion business. Van Bergen was succeed in command by Capt. Henry A. Snow, who remained in charge until 1870.

In November 1866, the Couch had a contract to carry the U.S. mail from Portland to Astoria. Captain Snow was then in command. Couch left Portland for Astoria and way landings at 6:00 a.m. on Mondays and Fridays of each week. Returning, Couch departed Astoria on Tuesdays and Saturdays at 6:00 a.m.

Captain Grenville Reed was also reported to have been in command of the John H. Couch for five years.

== Disposition ==
By 1870, Couch was no longer fit to carry passengers and was retired from service. In January 1873, Couch was dismantled, with the boat's engines being salvaged and sent to the upper Columbia, to be installed on another steamer.
