= Sweeney, Straub and Dimm Printing Plant =

Historic building in Portland, Oregon, U.S.

Coordinates: 45.5269°N 122.6878°W

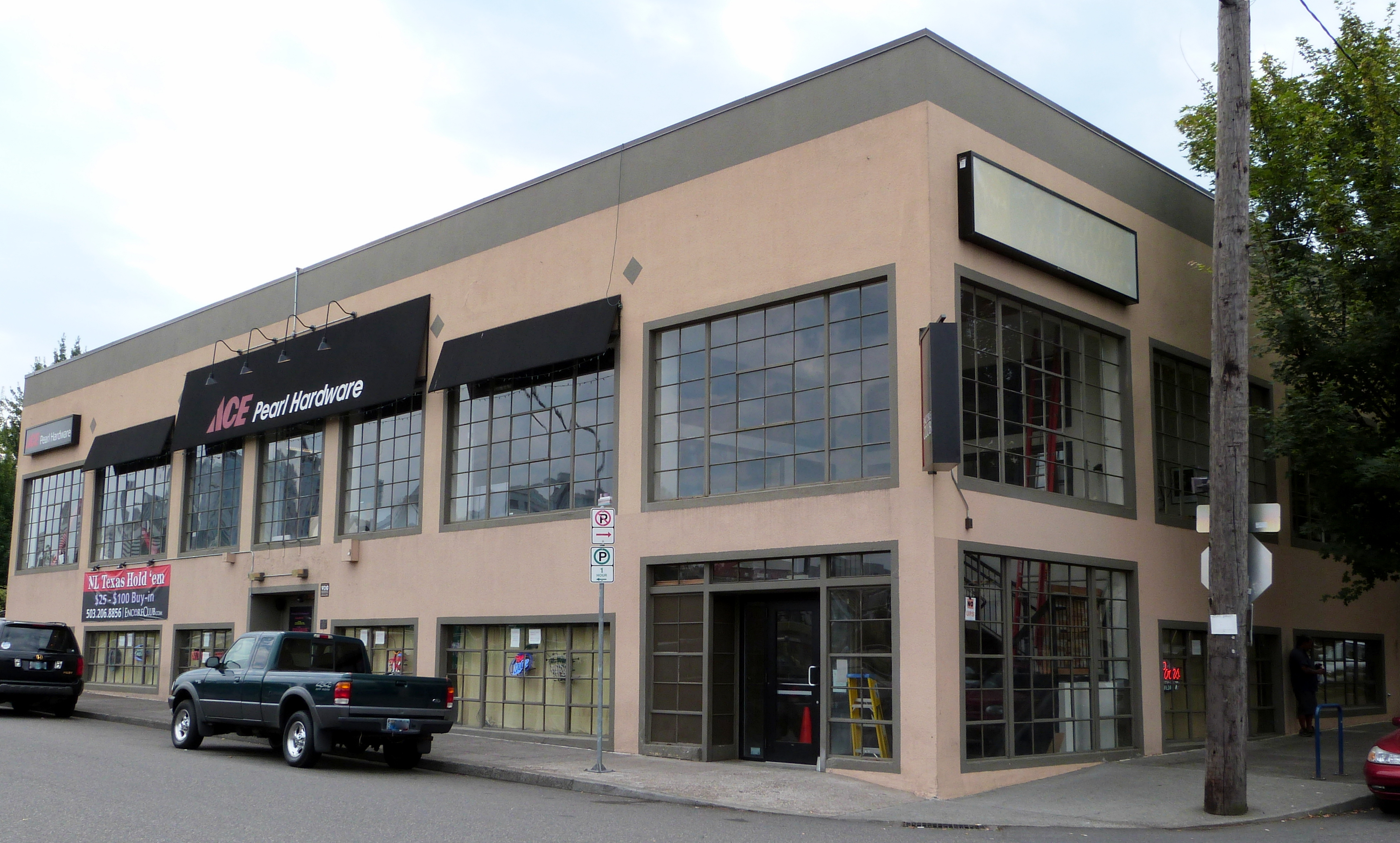
The building's exterior, 2012

The Sweeney, Straub and Dimm Printing Plant is a historic building in Portland, Oregon, United States. Located in Northwest Portland's Northwest District, it is listed on the National Register of Historic Places.

== See also ==
- National Register of Historic Places listings in Northwest Portland, Oregon
