= 2016 Portland, Oregon gas explosion =

Gas explosion

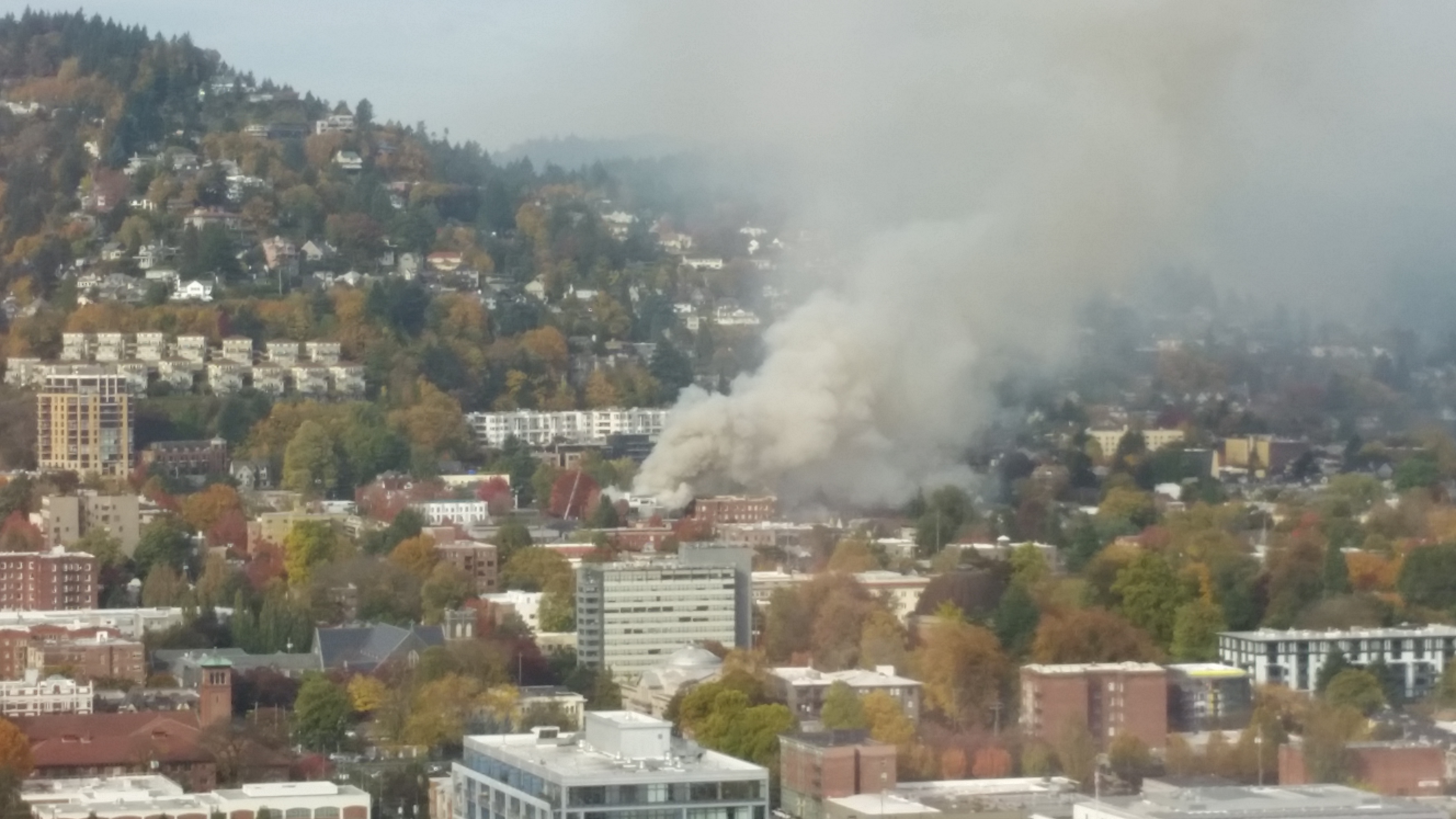
- A picture taken about 45 minutes after the explosion. The smoke plume could be seen from miles around.
- Date: October 19, 2016
- Time: 9:38AM PST
- Location: Portland, Oregon; 45.526371°N 122.698331°W
- Cause: Negligent excavation
- Outcome: 1 building destroyed, 12 others damaged
- Deaths: 0
- Injuries: 8
- Property damage: $17.2 million USD

A large natural gas explosion occurred in the Northwest District of Portland, Oregon, USA, at NW 23rd Avenue and NW Glisan Street on October 19, 2016. Nearby excavation caused a natural gas leak that triggered the explosion, which injured eight people and caused $17.2 million in property damages. The PUC (Oregon Public Utility Commission) determined the cause to be inadequate notification by the contractor, Loy Clark Pipeline. Thirteen buildings were damaged, including total destruction of the Alfred C.F. Burkhardt House, built in 1906 and listed on the NRHP (National Register of Historic Places).

== Timeline ==
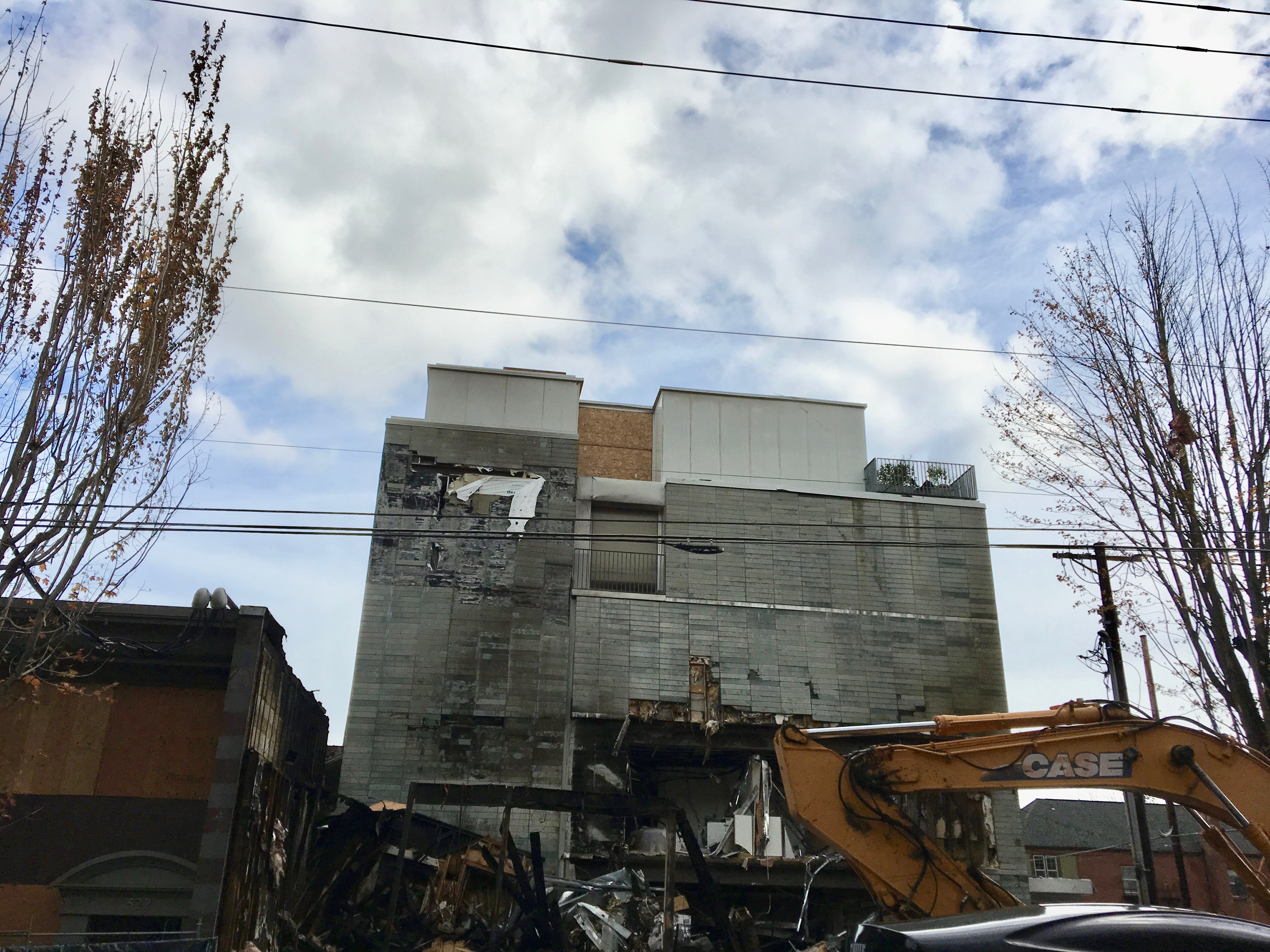
Aftermath of the explosion.

The accident occurred while Loy Clark Pipeline was installing a junction box in a sidewalk for Comcast at NW 23rd Avenue and NW Glisan Street. At 8:55 a.m., an excavator called the local gas company NW Natural after he hit and dislodged a natural gas pipeline belonging to them. The pipe did not break, but was pulled out of a valve some distance away, causing leaking gas to travel under the sidewalk and fill the basement of 500 NW 23rd Avenue. NW Natural responded to fix the leak but decided to call the Portland Fire & Rescue because they found "dangerously high levels of natural gas". A limited number of firefighters (three engines and one truck) showed up and Battalion Chief Scott Beyers made the call to evacuate the businesses and residences near the intersection where the leak occurred.

500 NW 23rd Avenue ultimately exploded. The blast occurred around 9:38 a.m. after reports of strong gas odor. Eight people were injured, including three firefighters and two police officers. After the explosion, hundreds of firefighters, police officers and paramedics responded. Hospitals and emergency services went into "mass-casualty mode" and made worst-case preparations. The nearby Legacy Good Samaritan Medical Center went without power in four of its buildings. Some 2,500 customers lost electricity after the incident. About 420 students at Metropolitan Learning Center, many of whom were in the process of taking their PSAT tests, were evacuated and transported to the Portland Public Schools headquarters as a precaution.

== Aftermath ==
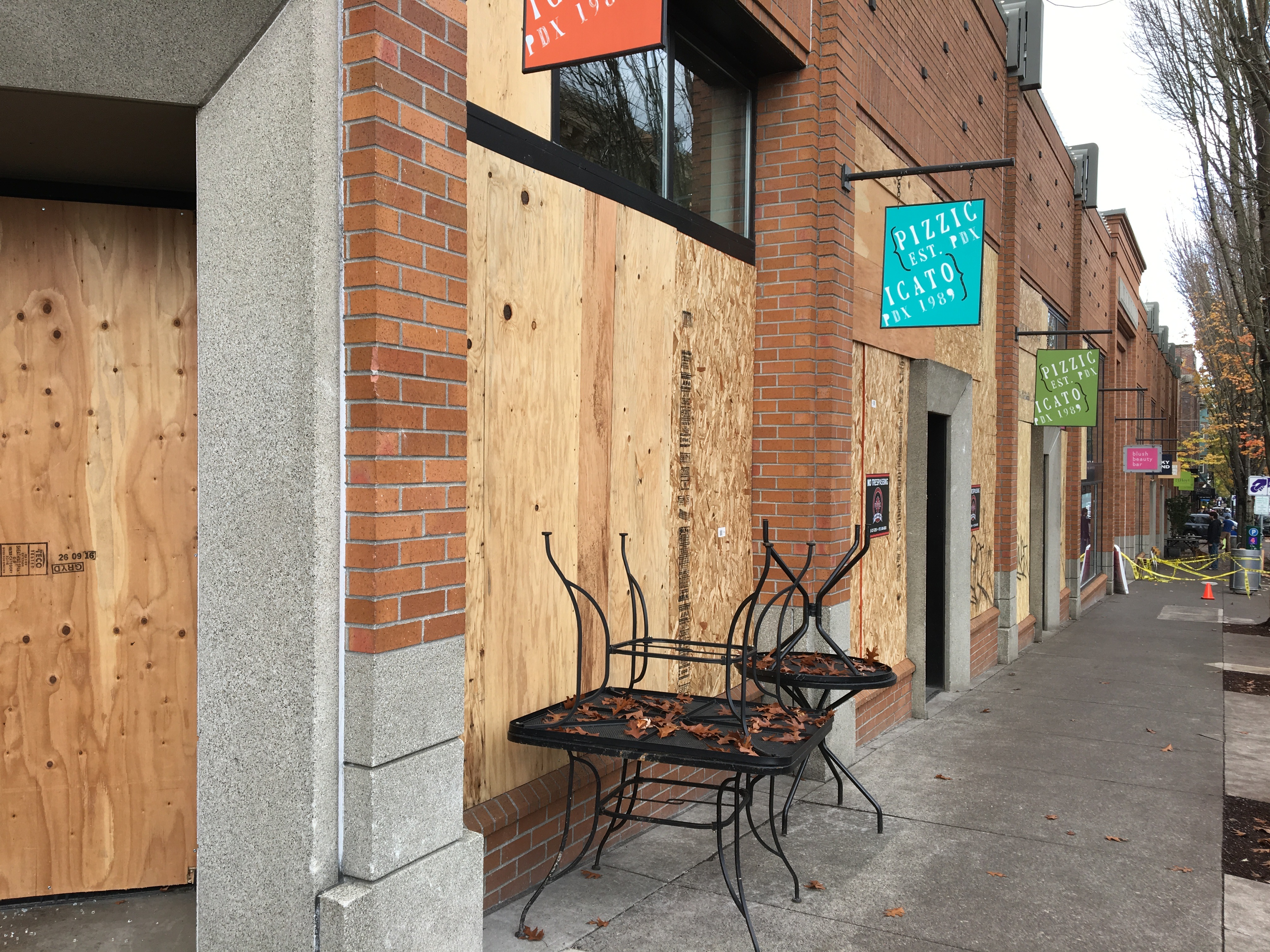
Boarded up businesses after the explosion

In 2018, ten lawsuits were filed against Loy Clark Pipeline, the company responsible for the blast. Loy Clark Pipeline was founded in 1957 and in 2016 was a part of Bismarck, North Dakota-based MDU Construction Services Group, Inc. The Oregon Public Utility Commission concluded "Insufficient Notice to the Oregon Utility Notification Center by Loy Clark Pipeline Co." as the root cause. KATU reported that Loy Clark Pipeline in five years leading up to the accident had six OSHA violations. Asbestos was found in the debris two days after the explosion. The building had abatement work done in 1990, but it did not include the roofing, which contained 35% asbestos.

Among the eight injured was a dental hygienist who was hit by glass shards. They filed a lawsuit for $689,000 against Loy Clark Pipeline. The owners of the building at 520–526 NW 23rd Avenue also named Comcast and Bremik Construction in addition to Loy Clark Pipeline in their lawsuit for "not properly vetting Loy Clark before hiring the contractor." For this incident, The Oregonian reported that OSHA fined Tualatin, Oregon-based Loy Clark Pipeline $4,900, and noted they dug on the north side of NW 23rd Avenue even though their notification was to dig on the south side. The American Red Cross set up a shelter for people displaced by the explosion.

In a press conference, Portland Mayor Charlie Hales later stated that "It's a miracle no one was killed.". The Oregonian reported in December 2019 that two additional businesses, Portland Bagelworks and Dosha SalonSpa, had filed lawsuits. The destroyed Alfred C. F. Burkhardt House had been on the National Register of Historic Places since 2000.

In 2022, a NW Natural employee and a Dosha SalonSpa salon worker won a lawsuit against Loy Clark Pipeline, which combined totaled to $10.4 million ($3.9 million to the NW Natural employee and $6.5 million to the salon worker). Both plaintiffs permanently suffer from hearing loss and pain from loud noises. Along with an additional $2.3 million in punitive damages, this was the largest payout from the result of the explosion.
