= John H. Couch =

19th-century sea captain in the Oregon Country

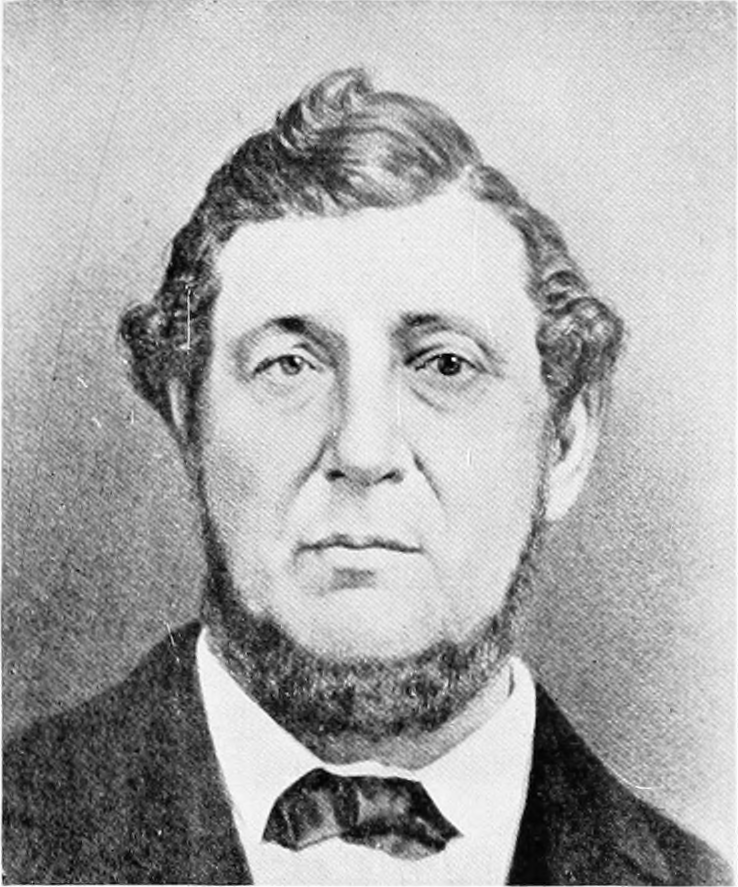

Member of the Portland Public Schools Board of Education
- In office 1856–1858
- Preceded by: Shubrick Norris
- Succeeded by: Erasmus D. Shattuck

Member of the Portland City Council
- In office 1853–1854
- Preceded by: Thomas Pritchard
- Succeeded by: Shubrick Norris

Treasurer for the Provisional Government of Oregon
- In office March 4, 1846 – October 15, 1847
- Preceded by: Francis Ermatinger
- Succeeded by: William K. Kilbourne
- Constituency: Oregon Country

Personal details
- Born: February 28, 1811 Newburyport, Massachusetts, U.S.
- Died: January 19, 1870 (aged 58) Portland, Oregon, U.S.
- Occupation: Sailor, ship captain, politician

John Heard Couch (/kuːtʃ/ KOO-CH; February 28, 1811 – January 19, 1870) was an American sea captain and pioneer in the Oregon Country in the 19th century. Often referred to as Captain Couch, he became known for his singular skill in navigating the Columbia Bar. He was a founder of Portland, Oregon.

== Biography ==
Couch was born in Newburyport, Massachusetts. As a boy, he yearned to be a sailor and duly enlisted on a voyage to the East Indies on the brig Mars. The Mars was owned by the uncle of Capt. George H. Flanders, with whom he would later go into business. This first voyage led to others, and eventually to his receiving a command of the Maryland in 1840 from John Newmarch Cushing, the father of diplomat Caleb Cushing. His first voyage in the Maryland was from Newburyport to the Columbia River, where he intended to exchange various goods for a cargo of salmon. The mouth of the Columbia was then considered one of the most hazardous places for navigation on earth, due to a large sand bar. His attempt at trading was rebuffed by the Hudson's Bay Company, which controlled commerce in the Oregon Country. The Maryland was subsequently sent to the Hawaiian Islands, where it was sold. Couch returned to Massachusetts by finding passage on another vessel.

Cushing did not attribute the failure of the trading voyage to Couch, however, and entrusted him with the command of a second vessel: Chenamos, named after a Native American chief from along the Columbia River, with whom Couch had established friendly relations on his first voyage. He arrived in the Pacific Northwest in June 1842, navigating up the Columbia and the Willamette River to just below Oregon City, which was the largest settlement in the Oregon Country, and at that time still disputed between the U.S. and Great Britain. Couch successfully established a general store and sent his brig home, remaining in the Oregon Country for five years. In 1845, he took a claim of land, now known as "Couch's Addition", in present-day Northwest Portland. The dispute between the U.S. and Great Britain over the Oregon Country, however, prevented him from perfecting the claim at the time. On March 4, 1846, Couch was appointed treasurer of the Provisional Government of Oregon after Francis Ermatinger resigned. In 1847 he took passage back to Massachusetts via China, arriving in Newburyport in 1848.

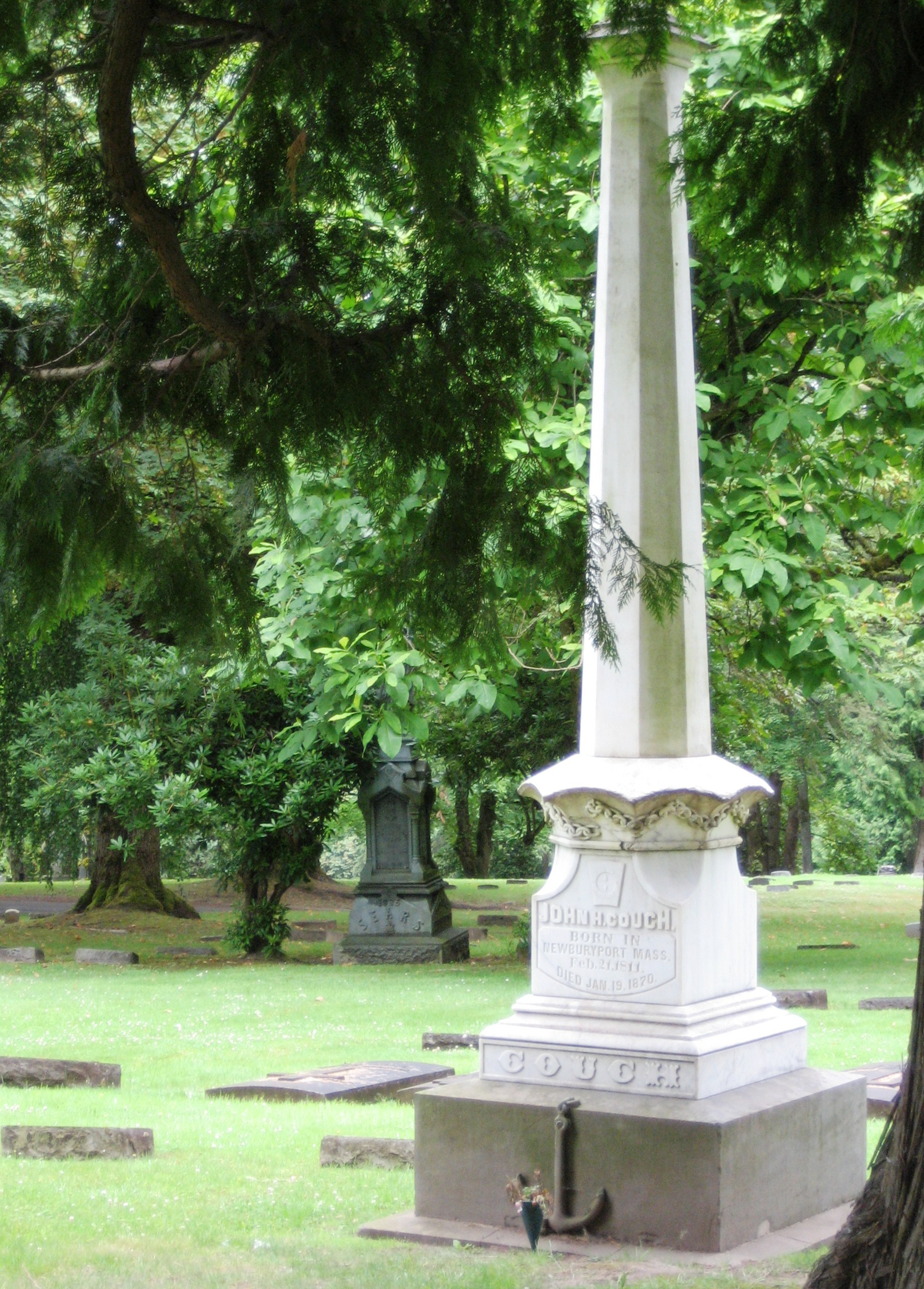
Couch's grave marker

Later in 1848 he was convinced by a shipping firm in New York City to take command of another vessel, the Madonna, on a voyage to the Pacific Ocean. Captain Flanders, who had been for years master of vessels for the Cushing shipping company, agreed to serve as chief mate, and to assume command of the vessel so that Couch could remain in the Oregon Territory to discharge the cargo. The Madonna sailed from New York Harbor on January 12, 1849, and arrived in Portland the following August. His passengers included United States Senator Benjamin Stark. Following his instructions, Couch stayed in Oregon City while Flanders took the vessel on short trips between Portland and San Francisco. In 1850 Flanders and Couch began a trading and wharf business together. The Oregon Treaty of 1846 (in which the U.S. acquired the Oregon Country below the 49th parallel north) and the subsequent passage of the Donation Land Claim Act of 1850 allowed Couch to perfect the land claim in Portland he had filed on his previous voyage to Oregon. From 1850 onward, he was a resident of Portland and became one of its most well-known and well-respected citizens. Couch served on the Portland Public Schools board from 1856 to 1858. His residence was near present-day Union Station. John Couch died on January 19, 1870, in Portland.

== Legacy ==
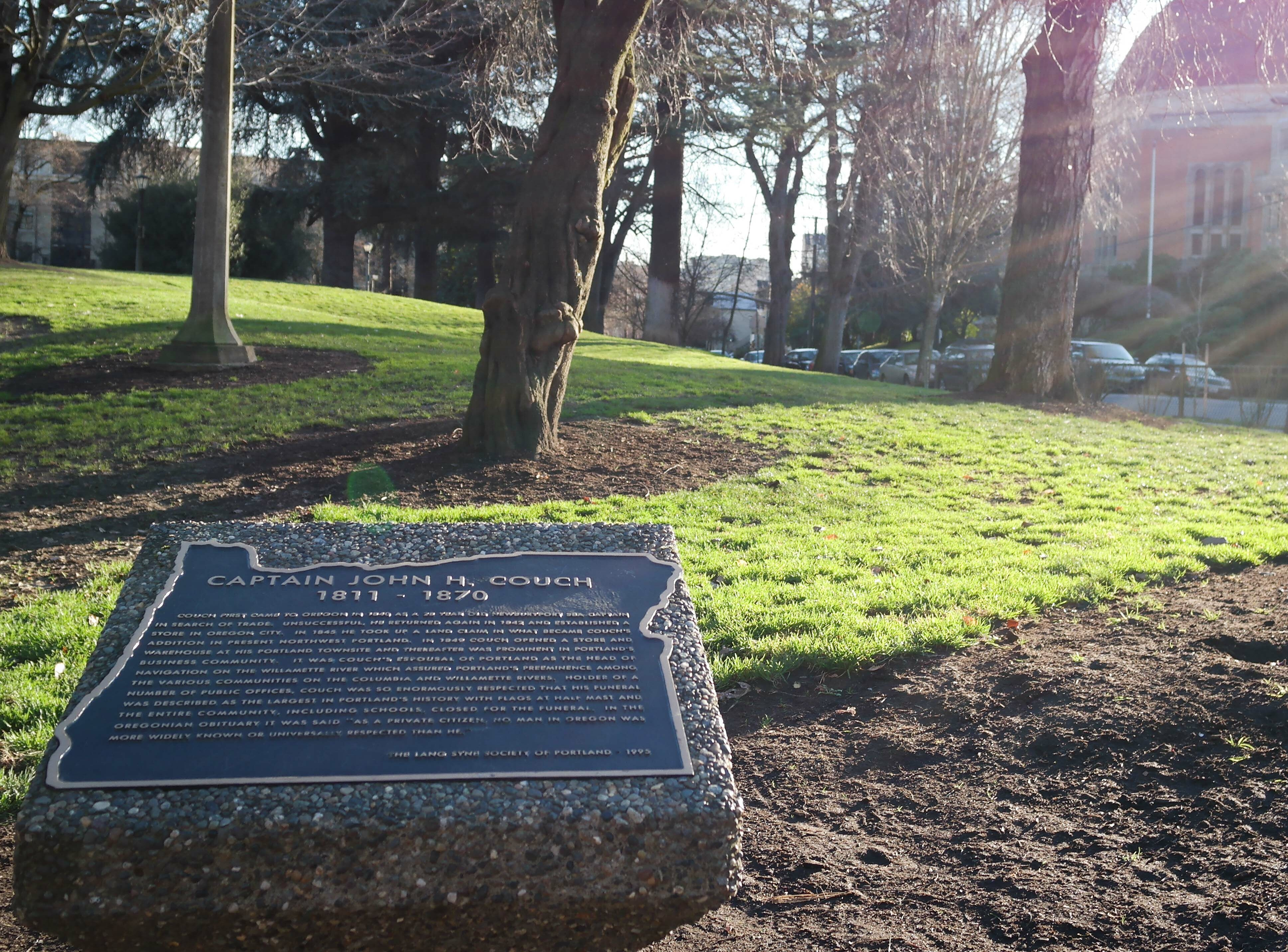
Plaque honoring Couch at his namesake park

The contribution to Portland for which he is most remembered today is the platting (plotting and subdivision) of his land claim in Northwest Portland, which stretched from Burnside Avenue north for 1 mile (1.6 km), between Northwest 23rd Avenue and the Willamette River. In laying out the streets, Couch named the east–west thoroughfares in alphabetical order as A Street, B Street, etc. The streets were later renamed, retaining the alphabetic ordering, with "C Street" renamed "Couch Street" in his honor. "F Street" was named in honor of his business partner Flanders.

Couch Park in the district is also named for him. The park was formerly the estate of Cicero Hunt Lewis, who married Couch's daughter Clementine. The area has become known more recently as the Alphabet District.

The side-wheel river steamer John H. Couch, built in 1863, was named after John H. Couch.

Couch Elementary School, now called the Metropolitan Learning Center, was named for him. The signage for Couch School is still on the building.
