= Couch Park =

Public park in Portland, Oregon, U.S.

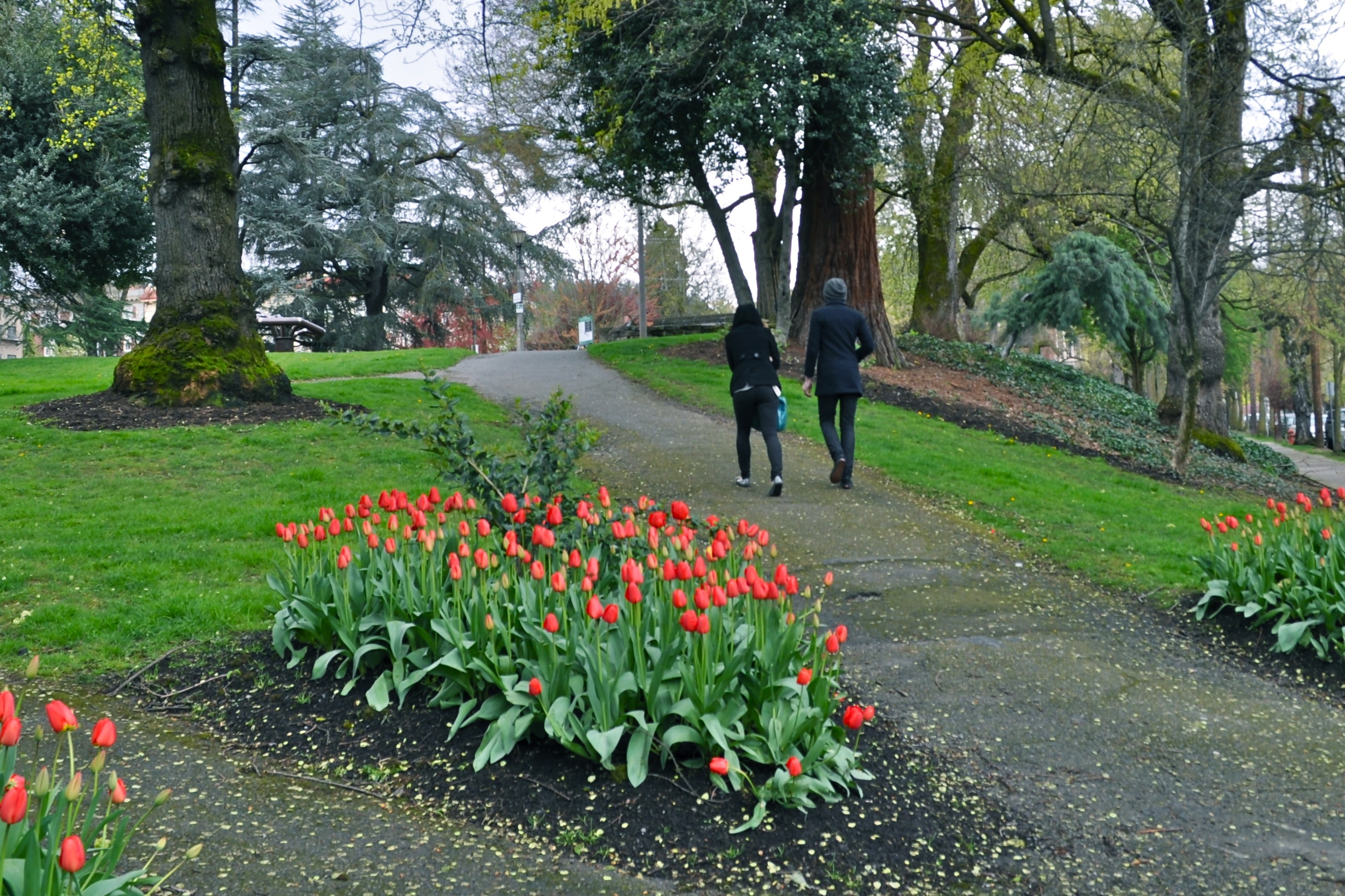
- The Northeast corner of Couch Park.
- Interactive map of Couch Park
- Type: Urban park
- Location: NW 19th Ave. and Glisan St. Portland, Oregon
- Coordinates: 45°31′37″N 122°41′26″W
- Area: 2.40 acres (0.97 ha)
- Operator: Portland Parks & Recreation
- Open: 5 a.m. to midnight daily
- Status: open

Couch Park is a city park in Portland, Oregon, located at the intersection of Northwest 19th Avenue and Glisan Street. Named after merchant John H. Couch, the park was acquired in 1977. The park is located adjacent to the Metropolitan Learning Center, a public magnet K-12 school.

== History ==
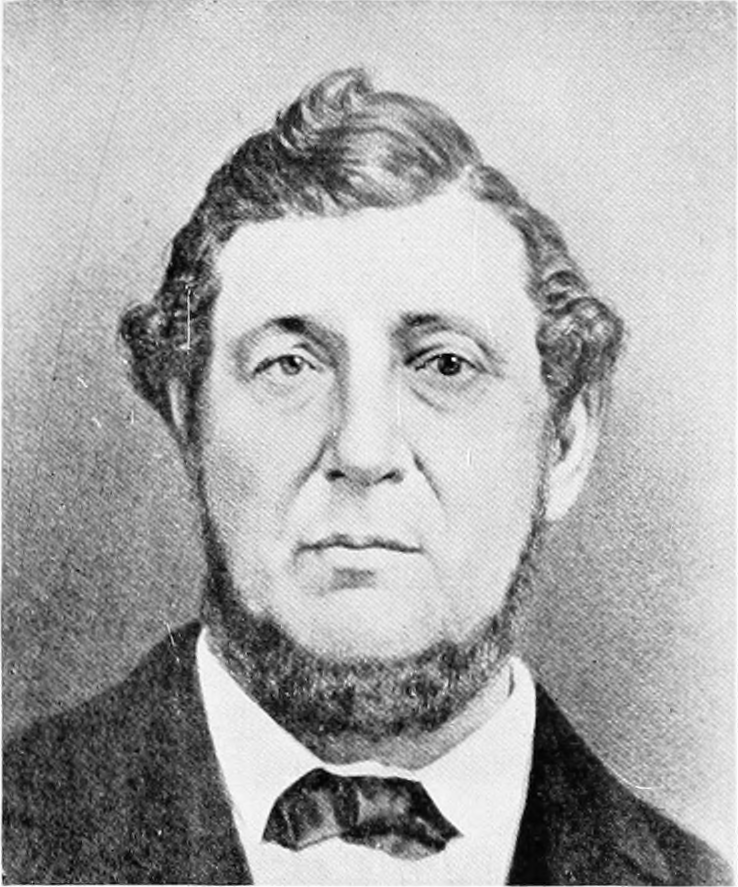
John H. Couch, the park's namesake

Couch Park was named after Captain John Heard Couch, who sailed from Newburyport, Massachusetts, to Portland in 1839. Couch owned and developed land from the Willamette River to what is now Northwest 23rd Avenue and from Burnside north for one mile. Blocks were named alphabetically as the land was developed, forming today's Alphabet District. The site of Couch Park was once the estate of 19th-century merchant Cicero Hunt Lewis, the husband of Couch's daughter, Clementine. The estate included a mansion, stables, and a greenhouse, each constructed in 1881. The Multnomah County School District (now Portland Public Schools) acquired the property in 1913 after demolishing it and constructed a school bearing Couch's name, replacing the first building built in 1882 at Northwest 17th and Kearney. Land now known as Couch Park was once the school's playground. Captain John Brown's house, constructed in 1890, was moved to one corner of the site in 1970 to spare demolition. Residents donated money to convert the house into a community center for senior citizens and medical services. However, the project was abandoned when the funding received was less than required. In 1973, the heavily vandalized building was demolished.

Couch School's name was changed to the Metropolitan Learning Center (MLC) in 1974. This left only the park named after Couch. Planning and construction for the park, including its play structure, began in 1975, a process which included MLC students and neighboring residents. Three art installations were erected in 1976; these included a steel sculpture by David Cotter, tile mosaics by Jere Grimm, and carved wood pillars which support the playground by Brent Jenkins, Eric Jensen, and William Moore. Only the steel sculpture still exists. The park was officially turned over to Portland Parks & Recreation management in 1977, although, with the exception of the pedestrian mall, it is still owned by Portland Public Schools.

== Features ==
=== Playground ===
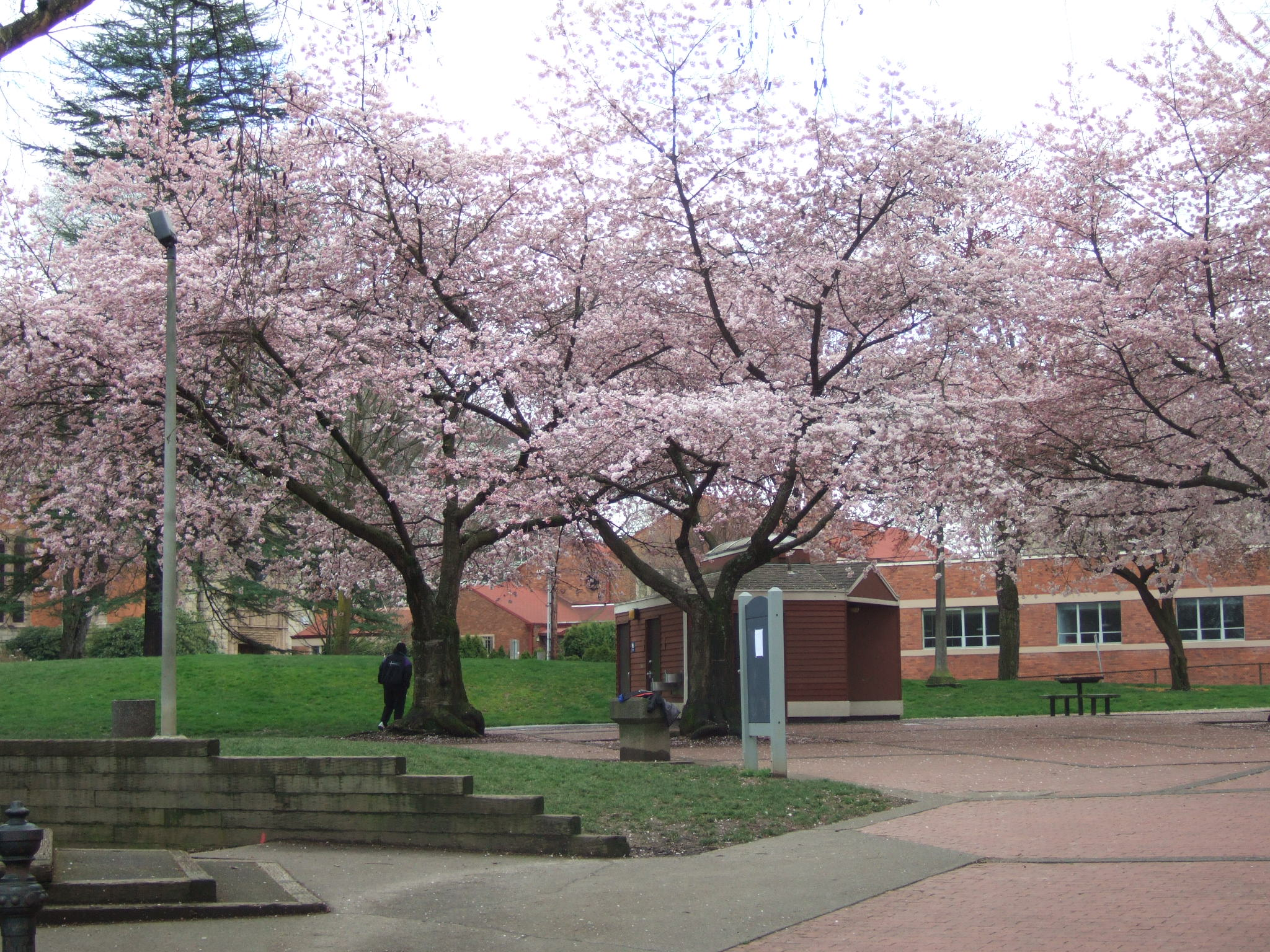
The park's pedestrian mall and restrooms before the renovations. The grass hill was removed in 2010, and the bricks were replaced with concrete in 2019

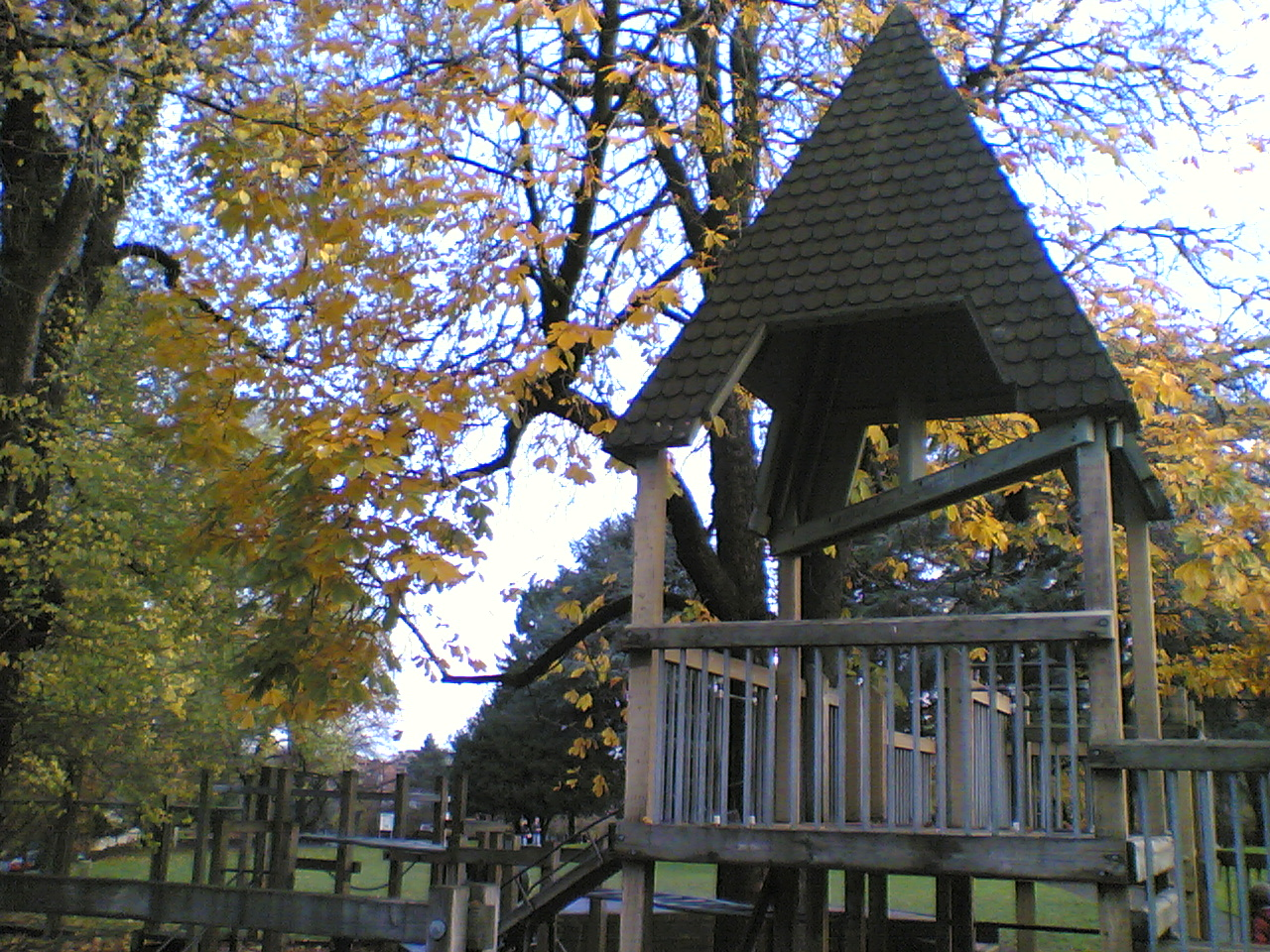
The former wooden playground, which was removed in 2014 and replaced in 2019

The park's inclusive playground was built in 2019, replacing a large wooden structure removed in 2014 due to termite rot. That playground was replaced by an empty plot of barkchips and 6 boulders until the new playground was erected. The new playground opened on May 4th, 2019, with a ribbon-cutting ceremony hosted by city commissioners Nick Fish and Amanda Fritz.

A fence was built around the playground in 2010, thanks to funds provided by The Opus Foundation and a voter-approved 2002 levy.

=== Dog park ===
The park features an unfenced off-leash dog park. The dog park area is used for concerts in the summer.

Couch Park was included in the book A Bark in the Park: The 45 Best Places to Hike with Your Dog in the Portland, Oregon Region (2005).

=== Trees ===
As of 2010, more than one hundred trees representing dozens of tree types were in the park, including birch, cedar, elm, fir, maple, pine, various fruit trees, and others. European white birch and English are the most abundant species in the park.

== See also ==
- List of parks in Portland, Oregon
- National Register of Historic Places listings in Northwest Portland, Oregon
