= Northwest District, Portland, Oregon =

Northwest District
- Neighborhood
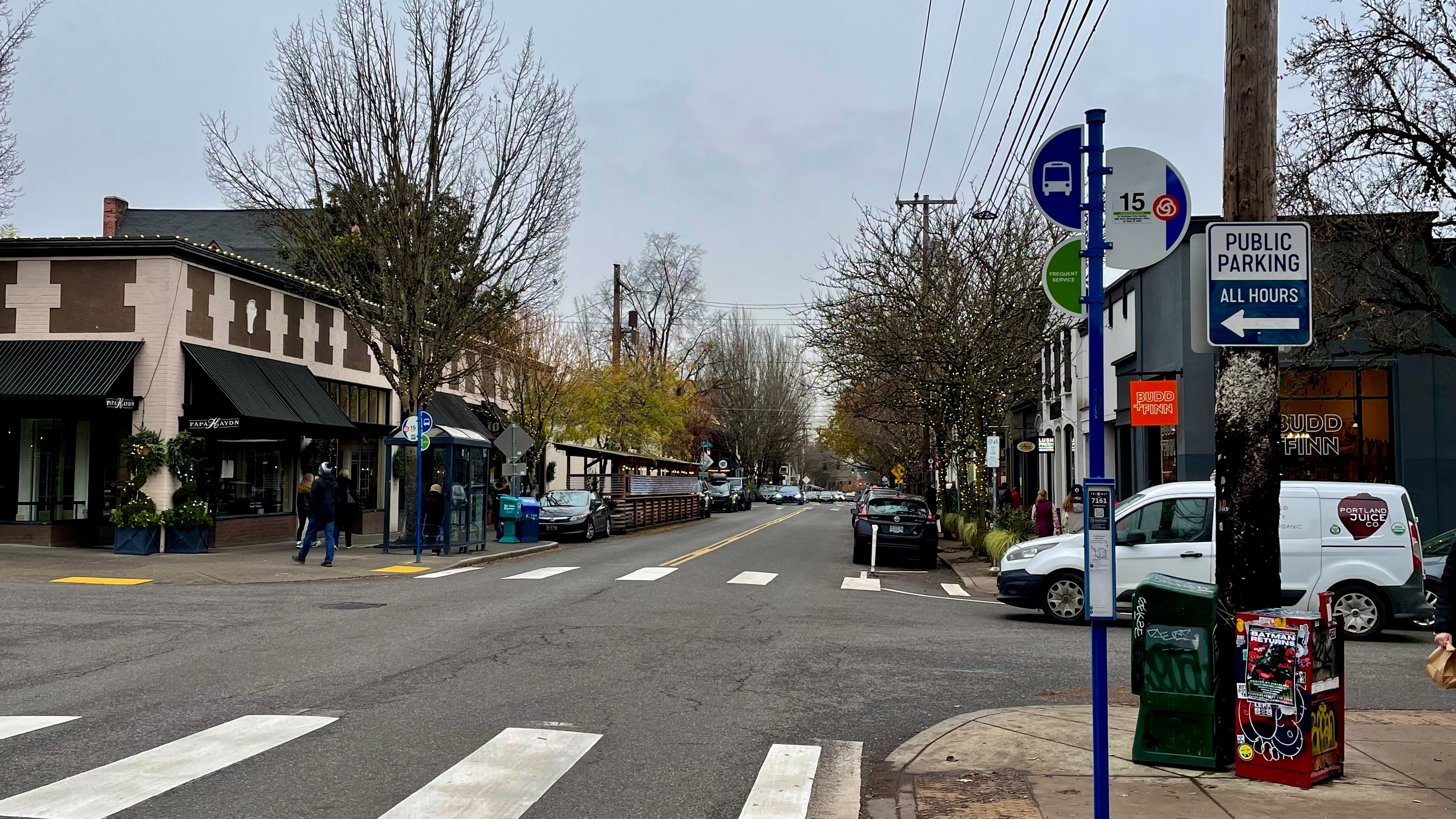
- NW 23rd Ave at Irving Street in the Northwest District
- Location in Portland
- Coordinates: 45°31′58″N 122°41′55″W
- Country: United States
- State: Oregon
- City: Portland

Government
  - Association: Northwest District Association
  - Coalition: District Four Coalition

Area
  - Total: 1.33 sq mi (3.44 km^{2})

Population (2000)
  - Total: 11,455
  - Density: 8,620/sq mi (3,330/km^{2})

Housing
  - No. of households: 7,567
  - Occupancy rate: 94% occupied
  - Owner-occupied: 1,137 households (15%)
  - Renting: 6,430 households (85%)
  - Avg. household size: 1.51 persons

The Northwest District is a densely populated retail and residential neighborhood in the northwest section of Portland, Oregon, United States. Craftsman-style and Old Portland-style houses are packed tightly together with old apartment buildings and new condominiums, within walking distance of restaurants, bars, and shops. The Portland Streetcar's NS Line terminates there, connecting the Northwest District to the Pearl District, Downtown Portland and points south to the South Waterfront. Several TriMet bus lines also serve the district.

The Northwest District stretches west to east from the base of the West Hills (Tualatin Mountains) to Interstate 405 (between NW 15th and 16th avenues), and north to south from NW Nicolai Street and the Willamette River to W Burnside St. It borders the neighborhoods of Forest Park and Hillside on the west, Northwest Industrial on the north, the Pearl District on the east, and Goose Hollow on the south.

This part of Portland is known more by names for various streets and areas within it than by its official name. These include:

- NW 23rd Ave. – Dubbed Trendy-third, this major shopping street is lined with clothing boutiques and other upscale retail, mixed with cafes, restaurants and pubs. This area is also known as Uptown (particularly its southern end near W Burnside St.) and includes Nob Hill (centered on NW 23rd Ave. and NW Lovejoy St.). On October 19, 2016, a natural gas pipeline was breached, causing an explosion that damaged several buildings on Northwest 23rd Avenue.
- The Alphabet District is an area of streets running from south of Burnside ("B Street") to Reed Street ("Z Street"). The naming scheme for the Alphabet District came about in 1865 when Captain John H. Couch platted his first subdivision. Each street on the plat was indicated by a letter of the alphabet. In June 1866, a city ordinance was approved to name "A" as "A Street", "B" as "B Street" and so on until "K Street". This was further extended to L, M, N and O Streets in 1869. This is how this area became known as "Alphabet District". From 1865 to 1891, this naming scheme was kept until they were assigned the street names, each beginning with its respective letter, that they are known by today. Today, every letter is included alphabetically except for X, which was named Roosevelt Street after President Theodore Roosevelt, and Z, named Reed Street after Simeon Gannett Reed.

The Alphabet Historic District, a portion of the larger Alphabet District area zoned for historic preservation, extending roughly between NW 17th and 24th Avenues, and between W Burnside and NW Marshall Streets, is listed as a historic district on the National Register of Historic Places.

Beyond NW 21st and 23rd are residential districts and recreational areas, such as the forested Macleay Park (acquired 1897, in the Forest Park neighborhood). Parks within the Northwest District include Couch Park (1977) and Wallace Park (1920). Northwest District public schools include Chapman Elementary School and the Metropolitan Learning Center. Legacy Good Samaritan Hospital and Medical Center and Linfield University-Portland Campus are located between NW 23rd and NW 22nd avenues.

Several characters in Portland native Matt Groening's television show The Simpsons have names based on the alphabetically named streets in the Northwest District, e.g. Reverend Lovejoy, Mayor Quimby and the bully Kearney.

== See also ==
- 2016 Portland gas explosion
- National Register of Historic Places listings in Northwest Portland, Oregon
- Slabtown, Portland, Oregon
