= Metropolitan Learning Center (Portland, Oregon) =

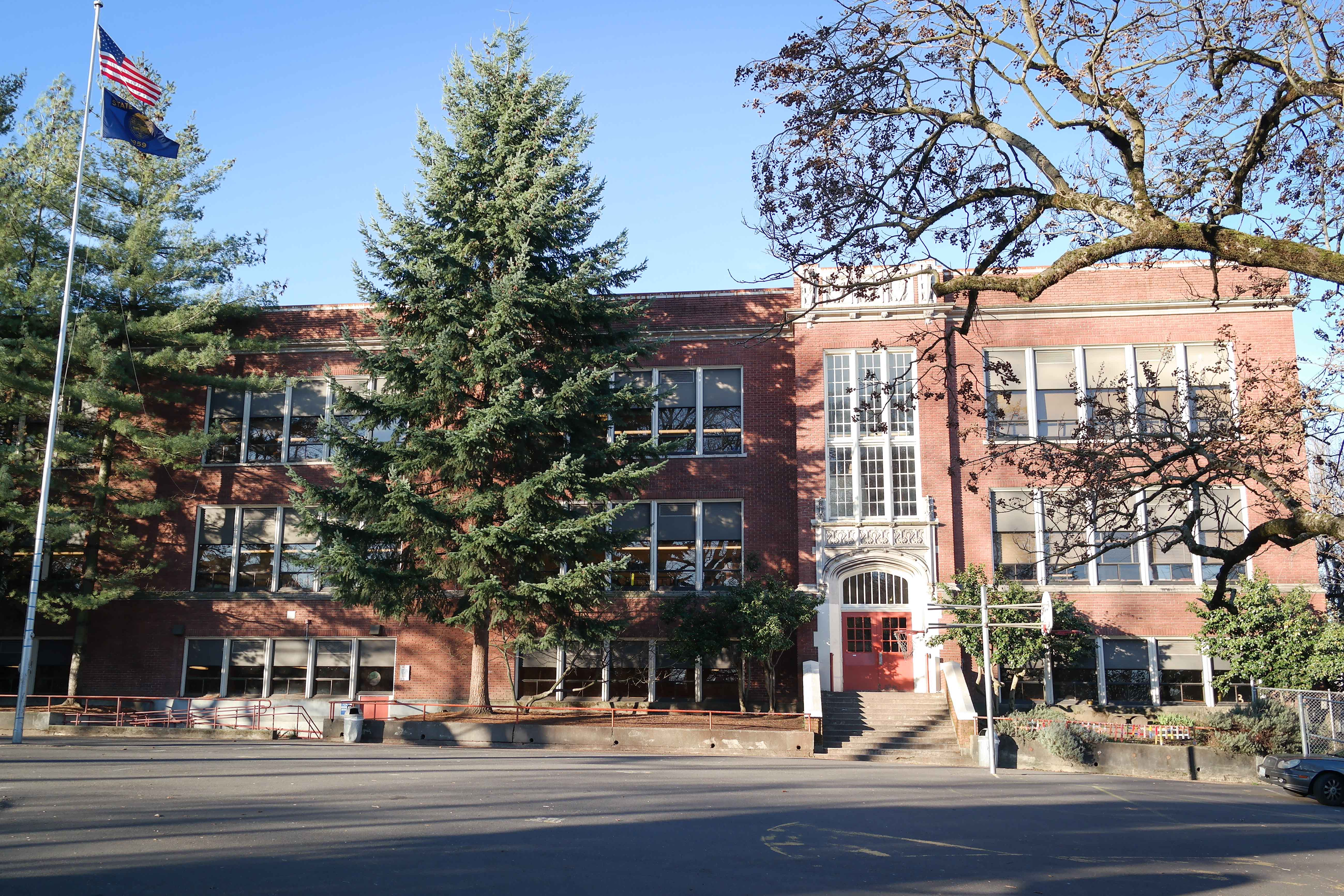

Location
- 2033 NW Glisan Street; Portland, Multnomah County, Oregon 97209; United States; 45.52669°N 122.69332°W

Information
- Type: Public
- Opened: 1968
- School district: Portland Public Schools
- Principal: Ashlee Hudson
- Grades: K–12
- Enrollment: 404 (2018 enrollment)
- Website: www.pps.net/mlc
- Couch School
- U.S. Historic district – Contributing property
- Oregon Historic Site
- Built: 1914
- Architect: Floyd Naramore
- Architectural style: Tudor Revival
- Part of: Alphabet Historic District (ID00001293)
- Added to NRHP: 2000

The Metropolitan Learning Center (MLC) is an alternative public school serving K–12 students in Portland, Oregon, United States.

The school is located adjacent to Couch Park. The playground at Couch Park doubles as the playground for the school.

== History ==
=== Couch School ===
In 1913, Portland voters were asked to consider a school budget that included new construction to modernize Portland schools. The dilapidated Couch School, an 1883 structure that had recently closed to contain an outbreak of smallpox, would be torn down, and a new Couch School would be built in 1914 at a cost of $177,000.

The architect for the new school was Floyd Naramore, newly employed as architect and superintendent for Portland Public Schools. Naramore was responsible for many Portland school designs including Benson Polytechnic High School and Shattuck School. Reflecting modern standards of the day, Tudor Revival was chosen as the style for Couch School.

Both the 1883 school and the 1914 school were named for Captain John Heard Couch, an early settler whose land became known as the Couch Addition when Northwest Portland was platted.

=== Metropolitan Learning Center ===
In 1968, Portland Public Schools began an experimental study environment at Couch School designated the Metropolitan Learning Center. Starting with 150 students from Couch School and other sites, the center encouraged students to create their own instructional environment—students were free to pursue subjects that interested them rather than following a strict curriculum set by teachers. Moreover, students were not grouped by age and did not receive grades. The center worked with Portland State College, later Portland State University, and Reed College to offer student teachers a central role in classroom instruction.

Couch School and MLC shared the same principal, Amasa Gilman. According to Gilman, the plan resulted in fewer discipline problems and higher attendance than at the conventional Couch School. Gilman continued as principal of MLC until 1975, when Portland Public Schools transferred him to a new location. His removal sparked protests among MLC students and staff.

A couple years after 1968, the distinction between the conventional Couch School and the experimental learning center it was hosting was dropped, and the entire school came to be known as the Metropolitan Learning Center.

In 2016, the Northwest District gas explosion occurred two and a half blocks away from MLC while many 10th grade students were taking their PSAT/NMSQT tests. Students were evacuated to the school district headquarters.

On September 15, 2018, MLC celebrated its 50th anniversary with a celebration attended by current and former students, faculty, and community members. The event featured various exhibits on the school and neighborhood's history as well as a panel discussion and Q&A with Oregon State Senator Lew Frederick as well as a few former students and the children of the school's founders.

In 2019, the playground at the adjacent Couch Park, which is used as the school's playground, was re-designed and replaced with an inclusive playground. The playground was designed in part by MLC students.

==== List of principals ====
1. Amasa Gilman, 1968–1976
2. Richard Wheatley, 1976-1979
3. Clarence "Cloudy" Beyer, 1979–1984
4. Mike Harris, 1984–1991
5. Pat Burke, 1991–1993
6. Eugene Valjean, 1993–1994
7. Ed Bettencourt, 1994–1997
8. Pam Shelly, 1997–2002
9. Greg Wolleck, 2002–2005
10. Pam Shelly, 2005–2006
11. Frank Scotto, 2006–2010
12. Pam Shelly, 2010–2011
13. Maccare Traynham, 2011–2015
14. Pam Joyner, 2015–2017
15. Alexa Pearson, 2017–2019
16. Mark Van Hoomissen, 2019–2022
17. Suezann Kitchens, 2022–2025
18. Ashlee Hudson, 2025–Present

== Student profile ==
As of 2025, the student population was 67.2% white, 12.1% mixed race, 10.6% Hispanic, 2.3% Asian, 2.3% Black, and 0.3% American Indian. In 2023, 89% of the school's seniors received their high school diploma. Of 19 students, 18 graduated and 1 dropped out.

In 2022, 20 out of 21 students graduated, and 1 dropped out.

In 2016, 91% of the school's seniors received their high school diploma. Of 35 students, 33 graduated and 2 dropped out. The student population during the same year was 79.9% White, 9.1% Hispanic, 2.1% Asian, 1.6% African American, 0.2% Native American, and 7% mixed race. As of 2017, less than five percent of MLC students are learning English as a second language.

== Academics ==
According to MLC's 2017–2018 school profile, the school began "as a challenge to the notion that educational rewards must be extrinsic and maintains the belief that personal relationships between staff and students are paramount." Accordingly, MLC does not issue letter grades, instead using a four category rating system ("Exceeds", "Proficient", "Developing", or "Does Not Meet") to evaluate students. Each category is assigned a grade point average range to show how the ratings can be translated onto a 4.0 scale.

== Notable alumni and faculty ==
=== Alumni ===
- Max Records, actor
- Rebecca Skloot, writer
- Tanya Barfield, playwright
- Courtney Love, musician
- Arnold Pander, comic book creator
- Jacob Pander, comic book creator
- Michelle DePass, member of the Portland School Board
- Leslie Bottomly, judge

=== Faculty ===
- Lew Frederick, member of the Oregon House of Representatives and Oregon State Senator
- Patte Sullivan, member of the Portland School Board
- Larry Colton, MLB player for the Philadelphia Phillies

== Gallery ==
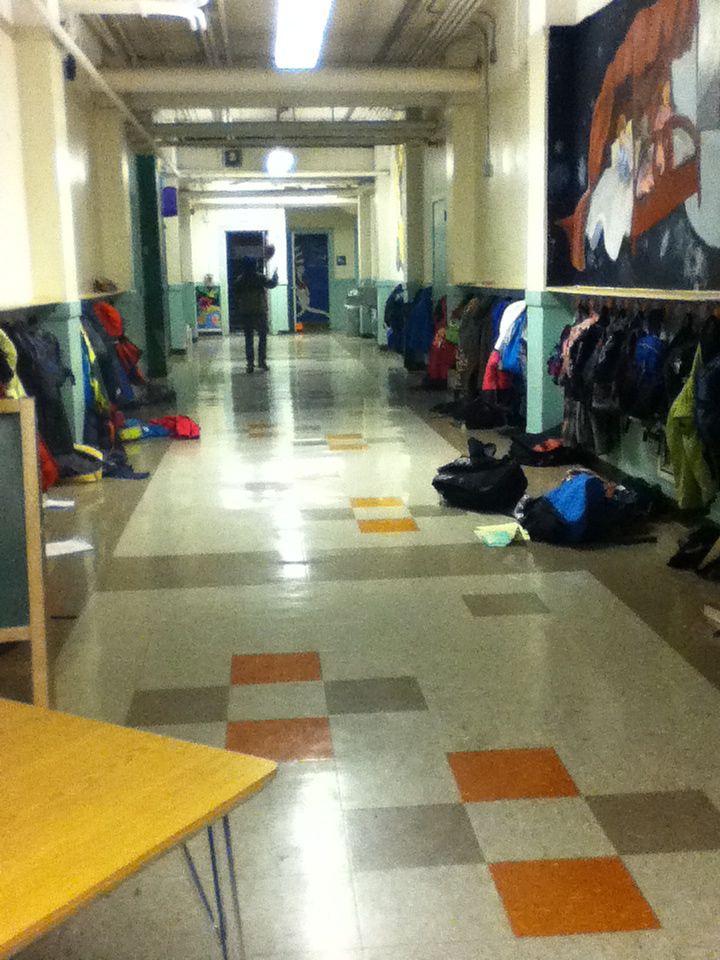
A hallway in the basement

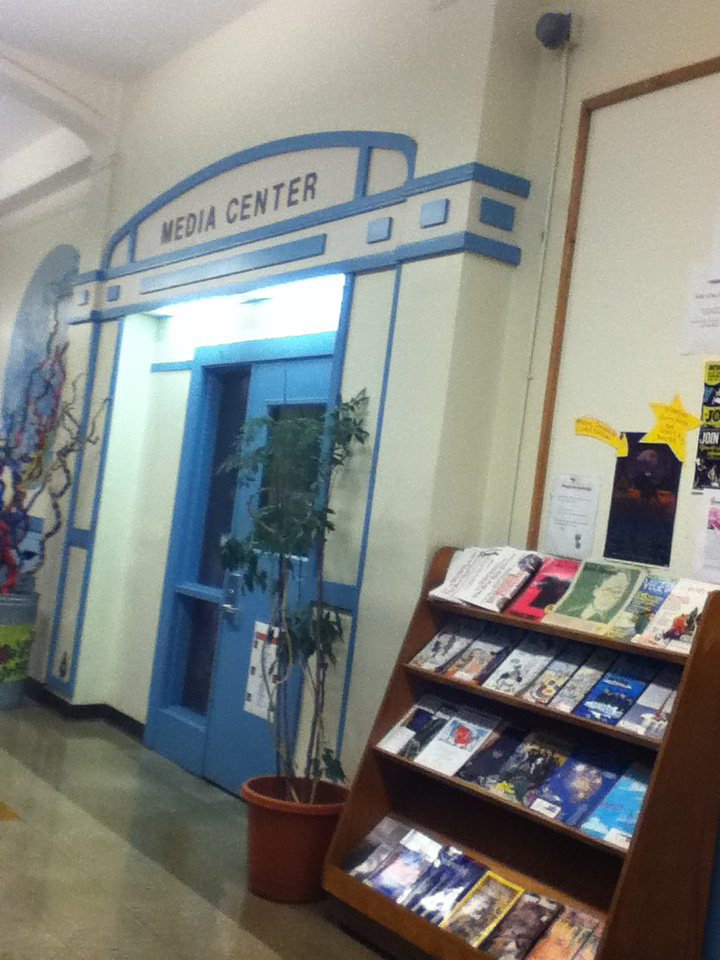
The Outside of the Library

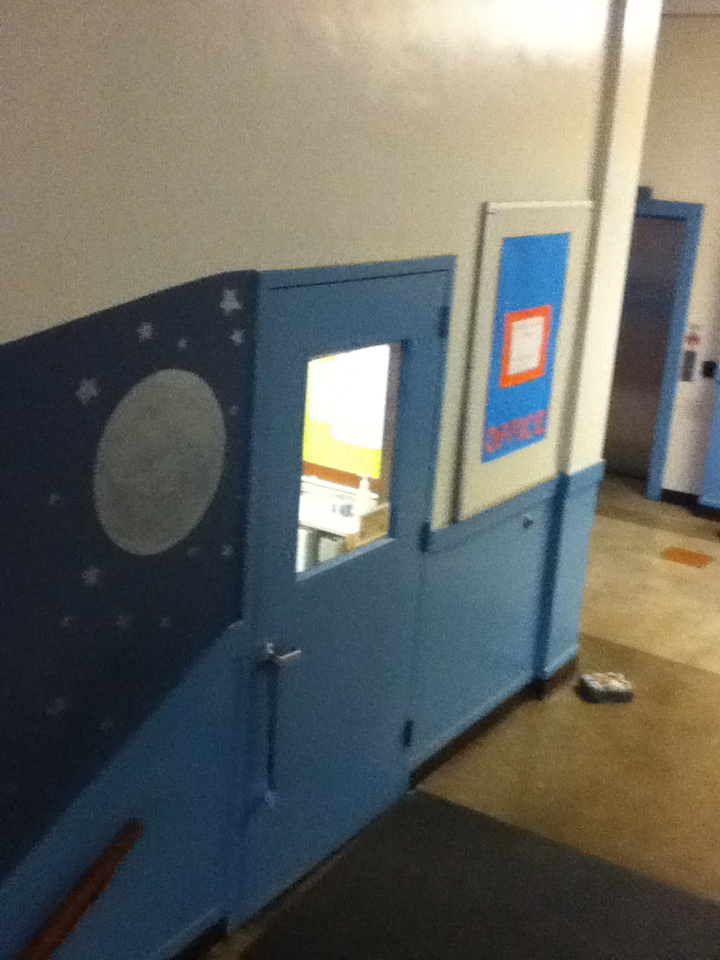
The door to the Main Office

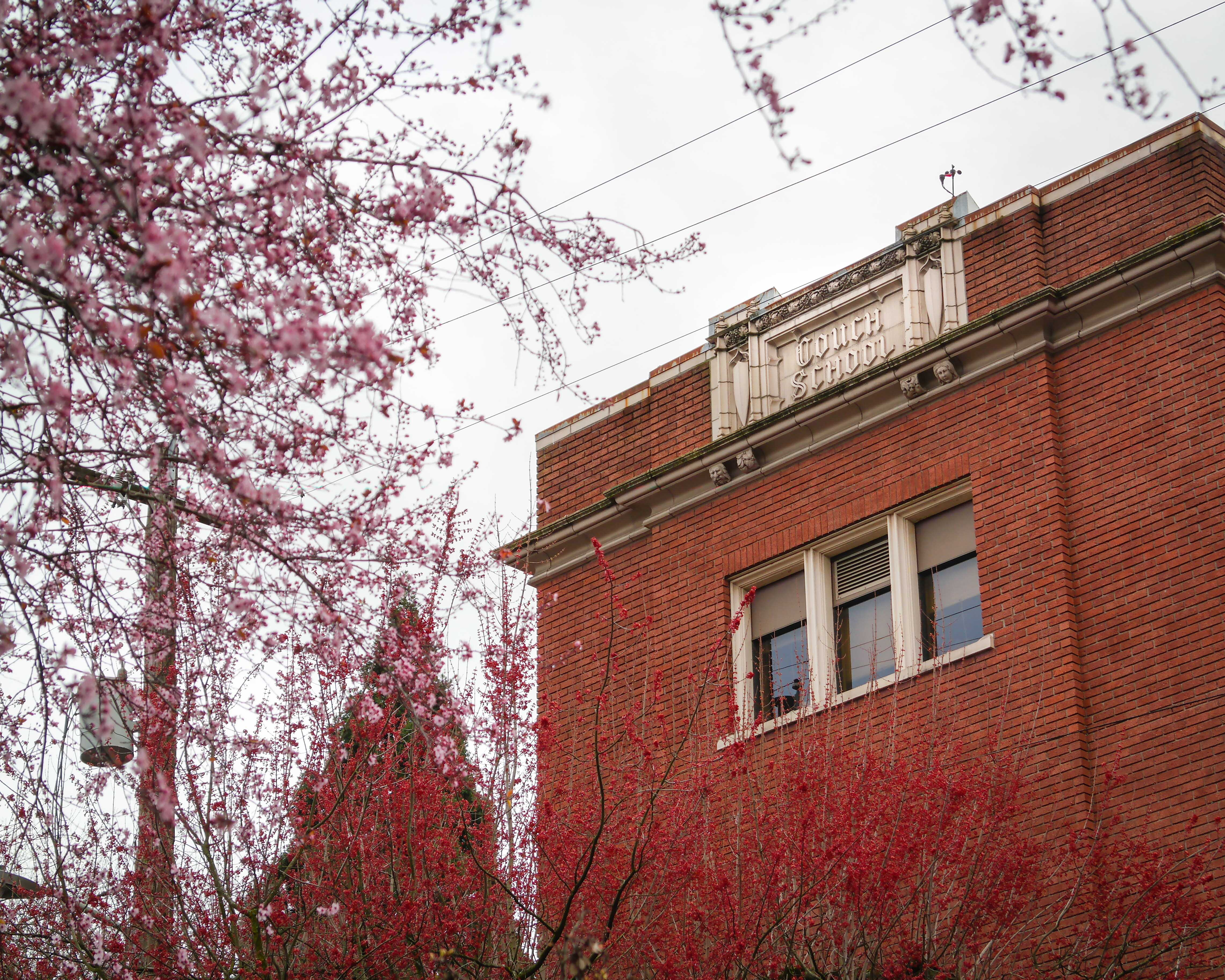
"Couch School" engraving

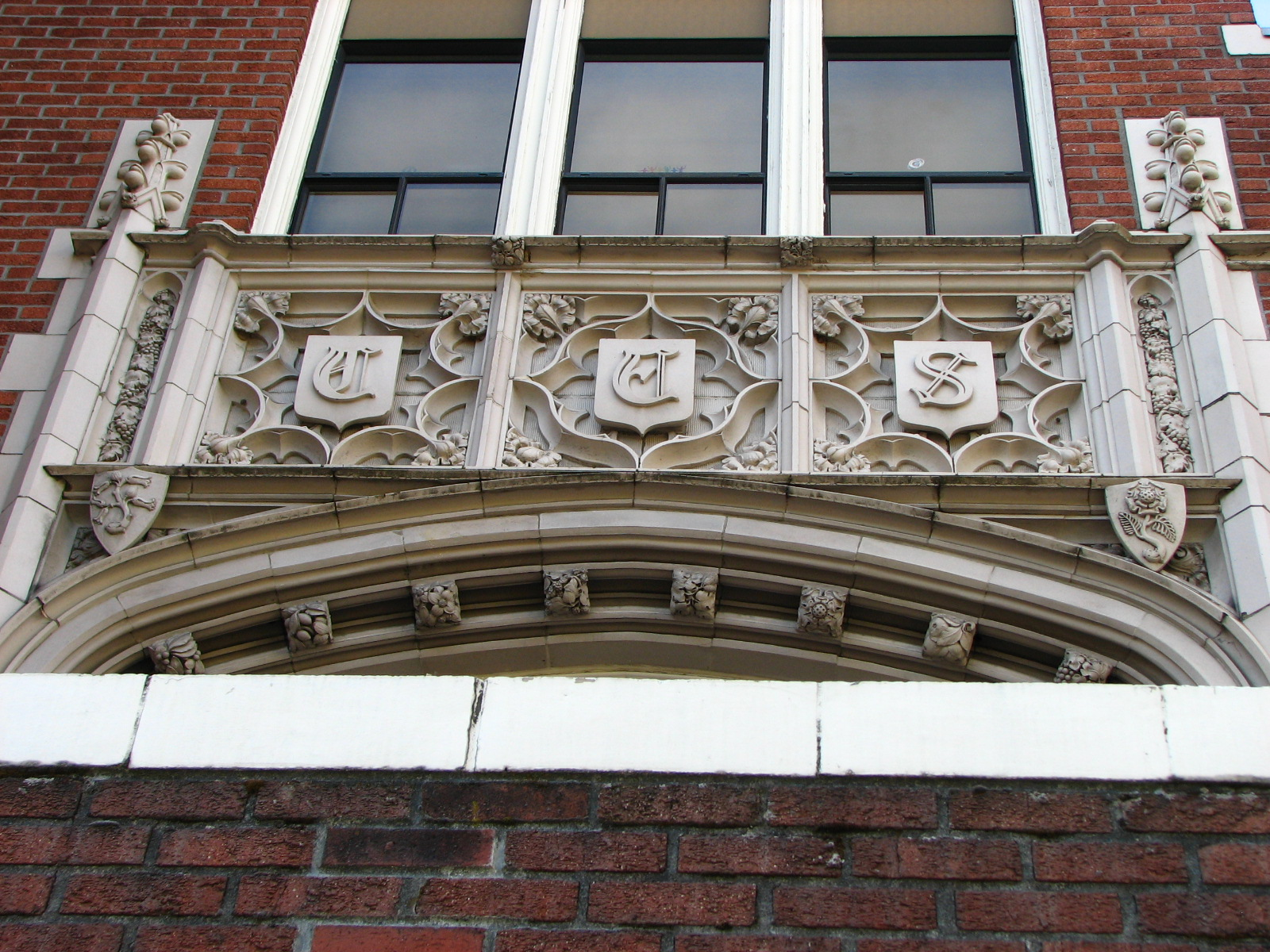
"C. E. S." engraving

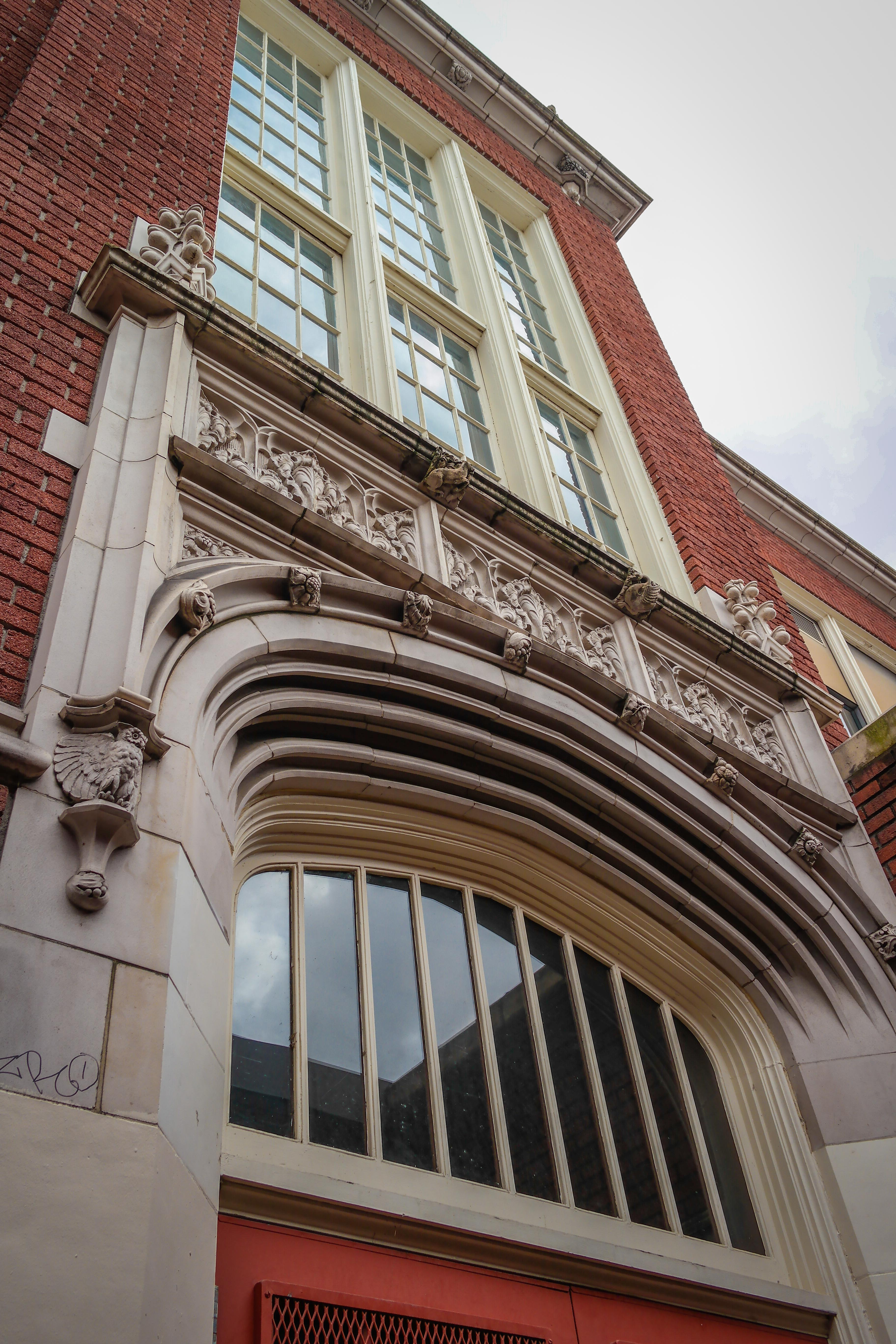

== See also ==
- Collegiate Gothic
- National Register of Historic Places listings in Northwest Portland, Oregon
- Northwest District Explosion
