= Wenat =

1857 steamboat built in Oregon, United States

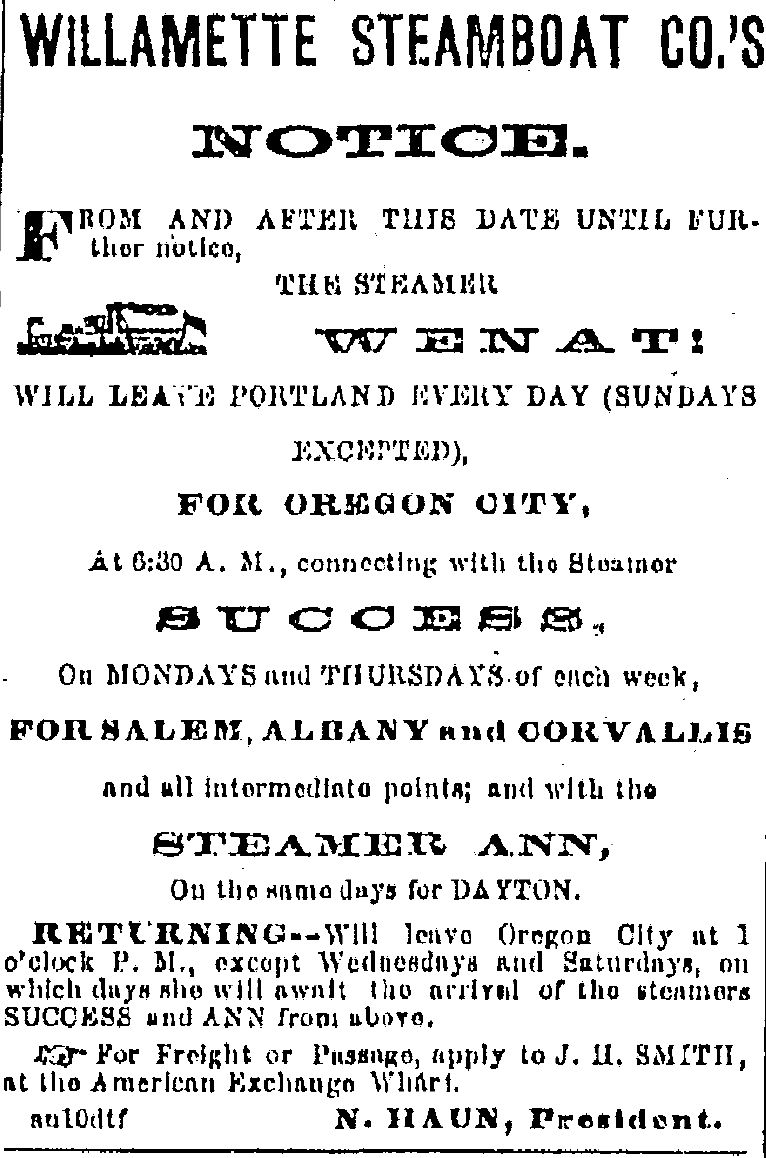
- Advertisement for steamer Wenat, from Morning Oregonian, September 17, 1868.

History
- Name: Wenat (ex Cowlitz ex Swan)
- Owner: Monticello and Cowlitz Steamboat Co.; Willamette Steamboat Co.; Joseph Kellogg; Oregon Steam Navigation Co., and others.
- Route: Tualatin, Willamette, Columbia, Duwamish River, White River, Puyallup and Skagit rivers; Puget Sound
- In service: 1857
- Out of service: 1878
- Identification: U.S. 80026
- Fate: Engines removed, converted to barge

General characteristics
- Type: inland steamship
- Length: 77 ft (23.5 m) or 87 ft (26.5 m) exclusive of fantail.
- Beam: 18 ft (5.5 m) or 17 ft (5.2 m) exclusive of guards
- Depth: 4 ft (1.2 m) 3.5 ft (1.1 m) or depth of hold
- Propulsion: 2 × steam engines; stern-wheel

Wenat was a stern-wheel steamboat that, under the name Swan, was built and operated, briefly, on the Tualatin River, in the state of Oregon. In 1858, Swan was sold, moved to the lower Willamette River, renamed Cowlitz, and placed on a route between Portland, Oregon the Cowlitz River.

In 1868, Cowlitz was rebuilt, renamed Wenat, which was operated from 1868 to 1875 on the Willamette and Cowlitz rivers. In 1875, was transferred to Puget Sound, where it operated on several rivers flowing into the sound, including the Duwamish, the Puyallup, and the Skagit, before being converted into an unpowered barge in 1878.

== Construction ==
Wenat was built, as Swan, on the Tualatin River by Silus E. "Si" Smith and George A. Pease in 1857, at a place called Moore's Mills, where a dam on the Tualatin was planned to be built.

Moore's Mill, named after James M. Moore, was about three miles up the Tualatin River from Linn City, Oregon, which was on the west side of Willamette Falls.

In July 1858, Swan was purchased by Charles Holman (d.1886), H.D. Huntington, and Oliff Olson of Monticello W.T. (now Longview), for a price of $7,500. According to one source, the sale occurred on completion of Swan.

Swan was taken below Willamette Falls and, as of July 15, 1858, placed on the run from Portland to the Cowlitz River.

Wenat was rebuilt in 1868 from the steamer Cowlitz at Portland, Oregon by Si Smith for the Willamette Steamboat Company.

== Dimensions ==
Wenat was either 77 or 87 feet long, exclusive of the extension over the stern, called the fantail, on which the stern-wheel was mounted. The beam (width) was 18 feet, exclusive of the guards. The depth of hold was 4 feet. The official merchant vessel registry number was 80026. Another source gives slightly different dimensions: hull 76 feet long, 17 foot beam, 3.5 foot depth of hold.

== Engineering ==
Wenat was driven by twin high-pressure steam engines, horizontally mounted, single cylinder, bore 8.25 in (210 mm), stroke 36 in (91 cm).

== Operations ==
=== Transfer to the Cowlitz River ===
Swan did not pay expenses and so it was sold and brought down over the rapids at the mouth of the Tualatin River and taken to Oregon City. At Oregon City the engines were taken out, and the boat was lowered down the ramp in the warehouse of the People's Transportation Company to the lower Willamette River. The engines were replaced, and the boat was taken to the Cowlitz River.

Pumphrey Landing was the departure point for the overland stage to Olympia, W.T.

In September 1857, Cowlitz, under Capt. Charles Holman, ran between Portland and Monticello, departing Portland mornings every Monday, Wednesday, and Friday at 8:00 a.m., and, on the return trip, leaving Monticello every morning on Tuesdays, Thursdays, and Saturdays, at 6:00 a.m. Oliff Olson worked as a deckhand, but later, after he was licensed, he became captain, taking the place of Holman. Captains Thayer and Kern succeeded Olson.

In 1864, Cowlitz was leased to Monticello & Cowlitz Steamboat Co to take the place of the steamer Rescue, which was then running to the Cascades Rapids, on the Columbia Rivar.

Two years after that, Cowlitz was taken off the Cowlitz river route, and placed on a run from Portland to the mouth of the Lewis River. Cowlitz departed Portland on Mondays and Wednesdays, and returned the following day. The Willamette Steamboat Company bought Cowlitz two years later.

=== Rebuilt as Wenat ===
In 1868, the Willamette Steamboat Company had Cowlitz rebuilt in Portland by Si Smith, the same man who had built the vessel on the Tualatin river eleven years previously. The hull length was increased by more than ten feet, and the engines were replaced with the machinery from the steamer Vancouver, a sidewheeler built in 1857 at Milwaukie, Oregon. The Willamette Steamboat company renamed the vessel Wenat.

In June 1868, the Willamette Steamboat Company operated Wenat, under Captain A. Boone, on regular trips between Portland and Oregon City, leaving Oregon City in the morning and Portland at 3:00 p.m.

At Oregon City, Wenat made a connection with the steamer Ann ex Lewiston, which, on Mondays Wednesdays, and Friday, ran for Dayton, Lafayette, and McMinnville and waypoints, on the Yamhill River. On Saturday of each week, Ann ran for Fairfield and Wheatland, on the upper Willamette River. N. Haun was the president of the Willamette Steamboat Company at this time.

As of September 17, 1868, Wenat was running for the Willamette Steamboat Company on a route from Portland to Oregon City, Oregon.

In September 1868, Wenat departed Portland daily except Sundays to Oregon City at 6:30 a.m. Once at Oregon City, Wenat connected with the steamer Success, which, Mondays and Thursdays of each week, ran for Salem, Albany, Corvallis, and waypoints.

The steamer Ann ex Lewiston, ran on the same days from Oregon City for Dayton, on the Yamhill River.

Wenat departed Oregon City at 1:00 a.m. on the return trip to Portland, except on Wednesdays and Saturdays, when Wenat would await the arrival of the steamers Success and Ann from upriver points.

in December 1868, there were four steamers running in opposition to the People's Transportation Company on the Willamette River. Wenat and Carrie ran between Portland and Oregon City. The Success and the Ann ex Lewiston ran between Canemah and Eugene City. Each of the four opposition boats was owned by a separate company, but there were rumors, in December 1868, that they would be consolidated into a single organization to oppose the near-monopoly of the P.T. Company.

=== Sheriff's sale to Joseph Kellogg ===
On the morning of April 30, 1869, Wenat was scheduled to be sold by Sheriff Zeiber to satisfy debts which had accumulated against the steamer. The steamer was purchased by Joseph Kellogg, who had the vessel repaired and refitted in preparation for bringing it back into service. Kellogg paid $3,000 for the boat.

As of May 5, 1870, Wenat was running from Portland to Monticello, W.T. on alternate days with the steamer Rescue, thus establishing daily steamboat service between the two cities. Passenger fare on this route was fifty cents. Freight rates were a dollar per ton The U.S. mail to Olympia was to be taken over this route starting July 1, 1870. J.N. Fisher took over as master, and he in turn was succeeded by Capt. W.H. Smith, who ran the vessel for several years. Captain Kellogg operated Wenat on the Columbia river as far as the mouth of the Sandy River.

== Under Oregon Steam Navigation Company ==
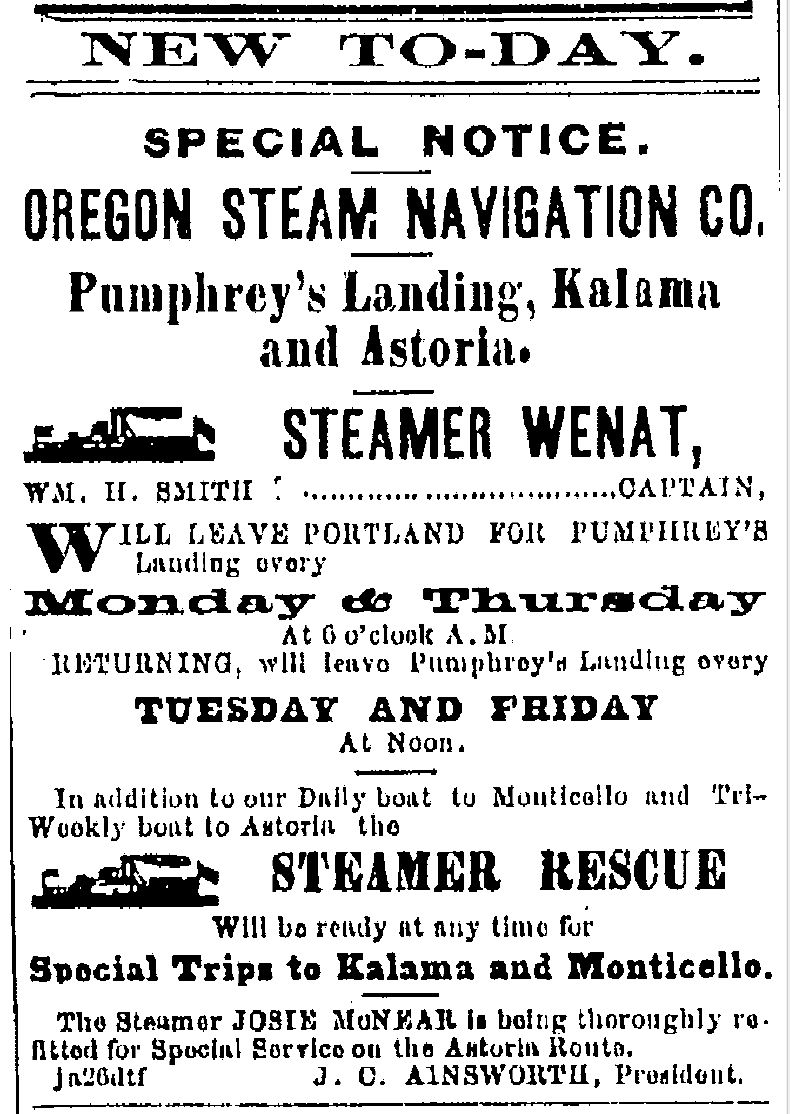
Advertisement placed January 26, 1871 for Wenat and other steamers of the Oregon Steam Navigation Company.

The Oregon Steam Navigation Company bought Wenat and ran the vessel on the Cowlitz River, between Monticello and Pumphrey's Landing, which, by 1877, was known as Olequa. Wenat frequently ascended as far as Cowlitz Prairie.

As of January 26, 1871, Wenat was running under the ownership or control of the Oregon Steam Navigation Company, the most powerful steamboat concern on the Columbia River. Starting on January 26, 1871, under Capt. Wm. H. Smith, Wenat departed Portland every Monday and Thursday at 6:00 a.m. for Pumphrey's Landing, and then returned the next day, departing Pumphrey's at noon. O.S.N. encountered some competition on this route from the steamer Carrie, running to Monticello under Capt. James Fisher.

During 1871 and 1872 during the construction of the Northern Pacific Railroad, Wenat made "a cord of money" for the O.S.N. while under the command of Capt. Billy Smith.

In May 1872 the stage took 15 hours to travel between Pumphrey's Landing, and Olympia. The stage line was then managed by one Coggan, and his wife, who kept the books. Once travelers from Olympia reached Monticello, on Wenat, they would stay overnight in the town, and depart the next morning for Portland on the steamer Rescue, under Capt. Richard Hoyt.

In 1874, O.S.N. transferred control of Wenat back to Joseph Kellogg, who then ran the vessel on the Columbia up to the Sandy River.

== Transfer to Puget Sound ==
In 1875, Wenat was sold to Capt. J.C. Brittain, of Seattle, W.T. who brought the steamer to Puget Sound.

Having departed from Astoria, Oregon, Wenat arrived in Port Townsend, W.T. on June 8, 1875, under Captain Brittain. Wenat was towed to Port Townsend by the steam tug Favorite, under Captain Winsor. Brittain intended to use Wenat on the White River trade. Also running on the White River at that time was the steamer Comet.

Wenat made its first trip on the Duwamish River on the morning of June 16, 1875, bringing down a raft of logs in the evening. The owners of Wenat had a contract to tow scows for a concern known as Talbot.

Wenat was also used for coal company operations on the Black River, a tributary of the Duwamish River which until 1916, was the natural outlet of Lake Washington. Starting in 1874, the sternwheeler Otter also ran on the Duwamish.

== Disposition ==
In March 1877 Wenat was laid up in Seattle, at Mechanics' Square, next to Carkeek's stone yard. The engines were scheduled to be removed in the first week of April 1877, after which the steamer would be converted to a barge. However, Wenat seems not to have been dismantled at that time.

On March 30, 1878, it was reported that "the regular periodical sinking of the steamer Wenat has occurred." In the previous six months Wenat had either sunk or hit a snag three or four times, with the most recent event occurring on the Duwamish River. Wenat, running under Capt. Henry Bailey, had gone up the White River, a tributary of the Duwamish, to pick up a load of 30 tons of potatoes. While coming downriver on the Duwamish, on the night of March 29, Wenat struck some sunken pilings, which tore a hole in the bottom of the hull, and sunk the steamer immediately.

The steamer Comet went to the assistance of the Wenat the next afternoon. It was speculated that the potatoes would not be much damaged by their immersion, and could simply be washed off and sent to their ultimate destination, San Francisco, where potatoes were reported to be going for unusually high prices.

An initial newspaper report was that Captain Bailey was not to blame, but that the vessel was difficult to handle in swift water when heavily loaded. The March 1878 caused so much damage that the boat could not be economically repaired. For $1,700 it was sold to J.H. (or J.J.) Moss, a half-owner of Wenat who removed the engines and installed them into a new sternwheeler, Josephine.
