= Portland Hills Fault =

Geologic fault in Oregon, United States

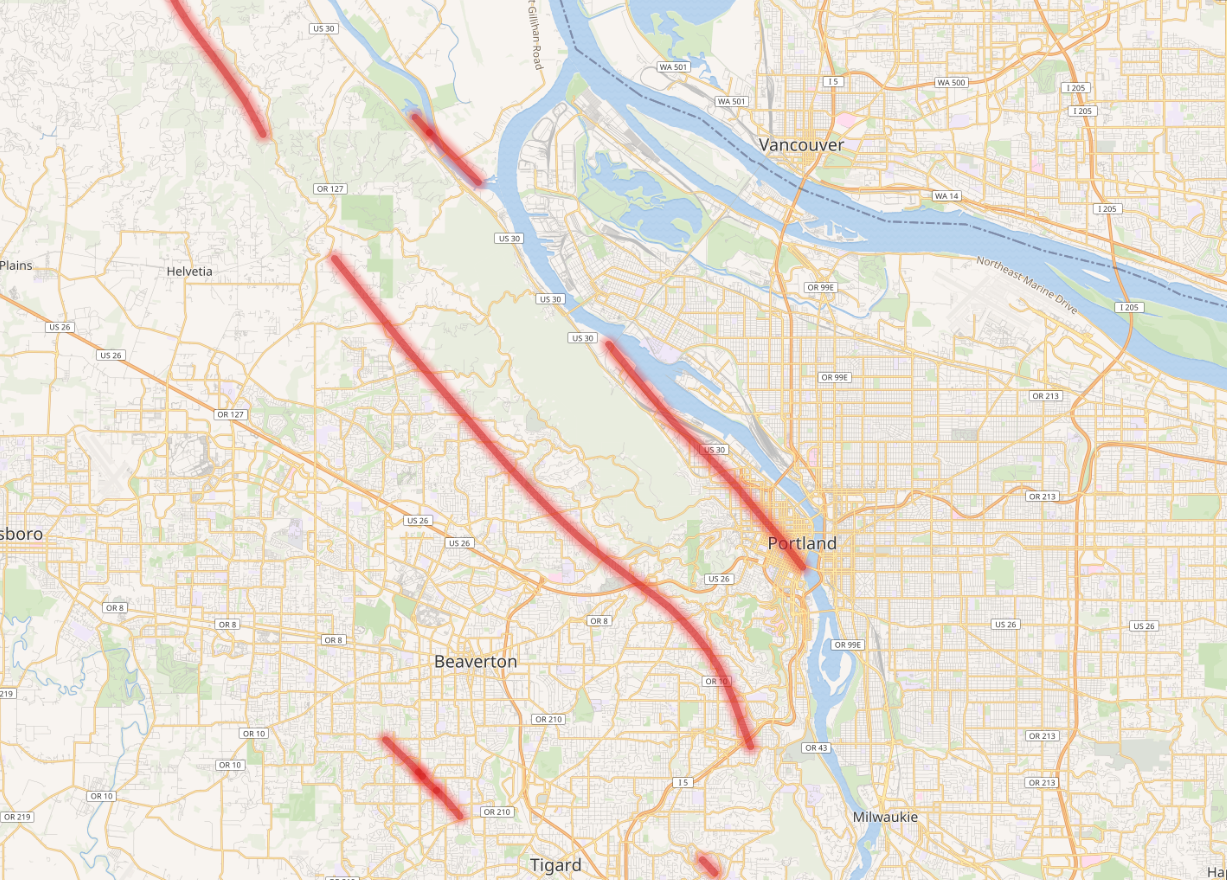
Portland Hills Fault using data from USGS and OpenStreetMap. Made using QGIS

The Portland Hills fault zone is the largest shallow fault that cuts beneath Portland, Oregon. It stretches from Oregon City to Scappoose, and has a zone of deformation that extends at least 1,300 feet (400 m).
