= 2017 Carolina Panthers season =

23rd season in franchise history, final under ownership of Jerry Richardson

- Owner: Jerry Richardson
- General manager: Marty Hurney (interim)
- Head coach: Ron Rivera
- Offensive coordinator: Mike Shula
- Defensive coordinator: Steve Wilks
- Home stadium: Bank of America Stadium

Results
- Record: 11–5
- Division place: 2nd NFC South
- Playoffs: Lost Wild Card Playoffs (at Saints) 26–31
- All-Pros: MLB Luke Kuechly; G Andrew Norwell; OT Daryl Williams
- Pro Bowlers: K Graham Gano; MLB Luke Kuechly; G Trai Turner; OLB Thomas Davis Sr.

Uniform
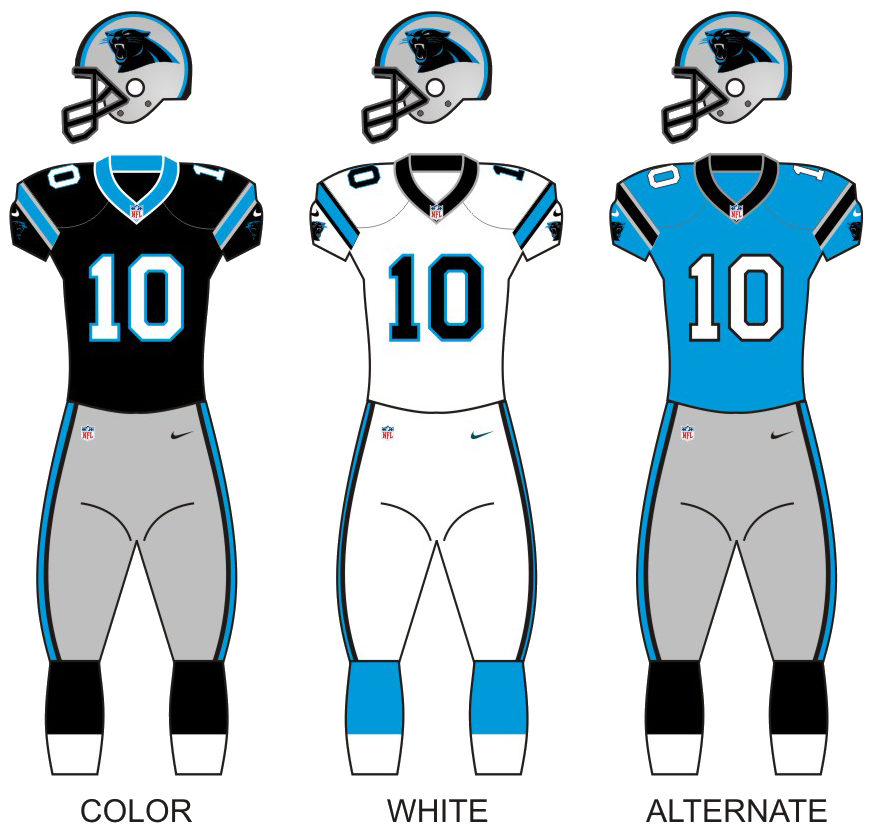

The 2017 season was the Carolina Panthers' 23rd in the National Football League (NFL) and their seventh under head coach Ron Rivera. During the offseason, the team's notable free agent signings included Matt Kalil, Captain Munnerlyn and veteran Julius Peppers. Peppers previously spent his first eight seasons with the Panthers, appearing in Super Bowl XXXVIII with them. On July 17, 2017, the team announced Dave Gettleman had been relieved as general manager. His predecessor, Marty Hurney, was hired as interim general manager a day later. For the first time since 2011, the Panthers did not play the Seattle Seahawks during the regular season. The Panthers rebounded after a disappointing 2016 campaign, where they were the defending NFC champions but finished 6–10 and last in the NFC South. 2017 saw the Panthers qualify for the playoffs with an 11–5 record. However, they lost to the Saints 31–26 in the Wild Card round.

The Panthers would not make the playoffs again until 2025. However, this remains the most recent winning season for the Panthers.

== Offseason ==
=== Signings ===
Position	Player	Age	2016 Team	Contract
OT	Matt Kalil	27	Minnesota Vikings	5 years, $55.5 million
CB	Captain Munnerlyn	29	Minnesota Vikings	4 years, $17 million
WR	Russell Shepard	26	Tampa Bay Buccaneers	3 years, $10 million
SS	Mike Adams	36	Indianapolis Colts	2 years, $4.2 million
OLB	Julius Peppers	37	Green Bay Packers	1 year, $3.5 million
DT	Kyle Love	30	Carolina Panthers	2 years, $2.2 million
WR	Charles Johnson	28	Minnesota Vikings	1 year, $1.6 million
OG	Chris Scott	29	Carolina Panthers	1 year, $980,000
CB	Teddy Williams	28	Carolina Panthers	1 year, $855,000

=== Releases ===
Position	Player	Age	2017 Team
DT	Paul Soliai	33	none
FS	Michael Griffin	32	none
C	Ryan Wendell	31	none
WR	LaRon Byrd	27	none
DT	Chas Alecxih	28	none

== Draft ==
2017 Carolina Panthers Draft
Round	Selection	Player	Position	College
1	8	Christian McCaffrey	RB	Stanford
2	40	Curtis Samuel	WR	Ohio State
2	64	Taylor Moton	OT	Western Michigan
3	77	Daeshon Hall	DE	Texas A&M
5	152	Corn Elder	CB	Miami
6	192	Alexander Armah	FB/DE	West Georgia
7	233	Harrison Butker	K	Georgia Tech

Notes

- The Panthers traded their third-round selection (No. 72 overall) and defensive end Kony Ealy to the New England Patriots for New England's second-round selection (No. 64 overall).

== Staff ==
2017 Carolina Panthers staff
Front office: Owner – Jerry Richardson; general manager – Marty Hurney (Interim); Senior executive scout – Don Gregory; Director of player personnel – Mark Koncz; Director of team administration – Rob Rogers; Director of pro scouting – Matt Allen; Director of college scouting – Jeff Morrow; Director of college scouting – Eric Stokes; National scout – Mike Szabo; Director of football operations – Bryan Porter; Assistant director of football operations – Mike Anderson; Director of player development – Mark Carrier; Executive assistant to the head coach – Linda O'Hora; Head coaches: Head coach – Ron Rivera; Offensive coaches: Offensive coordinator – Mike Shula; Quarterbacks – Ken Dorsey; Assistant quarterbacks – Cameron Turner; Running backs – Jim Skipper; Wide receivers – Lance Taylor; Assistant wide receivers – Jerricho Cotchery; Tight ends – Pete Hoener; Running game coordinator – John Matsko; Offensive line – Ray Brown	Defensive coaches: Defensive coordinator – Steve Wilks; Defensive line – Eric Washington; Assistant defensive line – Sam Mills III; Linebackers – Al Holcomb; Secondary – Curtis Fuller; Defensive backs/nickels – Jeff Imamura; Assistant defensive backs/safeties – Richard Rodgers Sr.; Special teams coaches: Special teams coordinator – Thomas McGaughey; Assistant special teams – Chase Blackburn; Strength and conditioning: Strength and conditioning – Joe Kenn; Assistant strength and conditioning – Jason Benguche

== Final roster ==
2017 Carolina Panthers roster
Quarterbacks (QB): 3 Derek Anderson; 4 Garrett Gilbert; 1 Cam Newton; Running backs (RB): 40 Alex Armah FB; 34 Cameron Artis-Payne; 22 Christian McCaffrey; 28 Jonathan Stewart; 43 Fozzy Whittaker; Wide receivers (WR): 11 Brenton Bersin; 12 Kaelin Clay; 14 Mose Frazier; 17 Devin Funchess; 19 Russell Shepard; Tight ends (TE): 84 Ed Dickson; 82 Chris Manhertz; 88 Greg Olsen	Offensive linemen (OL): 75 Matt Kalil T; 67 Ryan Kalil C; 69 Tyler Larsen C; 72 Taylor Moton T; 68 Andrew Norwell G; 65 Amini Silatolu G; 70 Trai Turner G; 73 Greg Van Roten G; 60 Daryl Williams T; Defensive linemen (DL): 97 Mario Addison DE; 92 Vernon Butler DT; 91 Bryan Cox Jr. DE; 96 Wes Horton DE; 95 Charles Johnson DE; 98 Star Lotulelei DT; 93 Kyle Love DT; 77 Zach Moore DE; 90 Julius Peppers DE; 99 Kawann Short DT	Linebackers (LB): 58 Thomas Davis OLB; 57 Andrew Gachkar OLB; 53 Ben Jacobs OLB; 59 Luke Kuechly MLB; 55 David Mayo MLB; 54 Shaq Thompson OLB; Defensive backs (DB): 29 Mike Adams SS; 24 James Bradberry CB; 31 Jairus Byrd SS; 20 Kurt Coleman FS; 23 LaDarius Gunter CB; 42 Colin Jones FS; 41 Captain Munnerlyn CB; 27 Kevon Seymour CB; 26 Daryl Worley CB; Special teams (ST): 9 Graham Gano K; 44 J. J. Jansen LS; 5 Michael Palardy P	Practice squad: 16 Rasheed Bailey WR; 85 Evan Baylis TE; 49 Richie Brown LB; 76 Blaine Clausell T; 8 Austin Duke WR; 15 Jamaal Jones WR; 71 Efe Obada DE (IPP); 25 Damian Parms SS; 33 Zack Sanchez CB; 37 Dezmen Southward SS; 86 Kent Taylor TE; Reserve: 18 Damiere Byrd WR (IR); 36 Demetrious Cox SS (IR); 35 Corn Elder CB (IR); 71 Dan France T (IR); 94 Daeshon Hall DE (IR); 79 Drew Iddings DT (IR); 12 Charles Johnson WR (IR); 32 Cole Luke CB (IR); 52 Jared Norris OLB (IR); 2 Fred Ross WR (IR); 10 Curtis Samuel WR (IR); 80 Scott Simonson TE (IR); 74 John Theus T (IR); 21 Teddy Williams CB (IR); 61 David Yankey G (IR); Rookies in italics 53 active, 15 reserve, 11 practice squad

== Preseason ==
Week	Date	Opponent	Result	Record	Venue	TV	Recap
1	August 9	Houston Texans	W 27–17	1–0	Bank of America Stadium	Kevin Kugler, Spencer Tillman, Drew Dougherty/Mick Mixon, Mike Rucker, Kevin Donnalley	Recap
2	August 19	at Tennessee Titans	L 27–34	1–1	Nissan Stadium	Mick Mixon, Mike Rucker, Kevin Donnalley/Dan Hellie, Charles Davis, Joe Leadingham	Recap
3	August 24	at Jacksonville Jaguars	W 24–23	2–1	EverBank Field	Mick Mixon, Mike Rucker, Kevin Donnalley/Brian Sexton, Mark Brunell, Brent Martineau, Erica Bennett	Recap
4	August 31	Pittsburgh Steelers	L 14–17	2–2	Bank of America Stadium	Bob Pompeani, Charlie Batch, Missi Matthews/Mick Mixon, Mike Rucker, Kevin Donnalley	Recap

== Regular season ==
=== Schedule ===
Week	Date	Opponent	Result	Record	Venue	Recap
1	September 10	at San Francisco 49ers	**W** 23–3	1–0	Levi's Stadium	Recap
2	September 17	Buffalo Bills	**W** 9–3	2–0	Bank of America Stadium	Recap
3	September 24	**New Orleans Saints**	**L** 13–34	2–1	Bank of America Stadium	Recap
4	October 1	at New England Patriots	**W** 33–30	3–1	Gillette Stadium	Recap
5	October 8	at Detroit Lions	**W** 27–24	4–1	Ford Field	Recap
6	October 12	Philadelphia Eagles	**L** 23–28	4–2	Bank of America Stadium	Recap
7	October 22	at Chicago Bears	**L** 3–17	4–3	Soldier Field	Recap
8	October 29	at **Tampa Bay Buccaneers**	**W** 17–3	5–3	Raymond James Stadium	Recap
9	November 5	**Atlanta Falcons**	**W** 20–17	6–3	Bank of America Stadium	Recap
10	November 13	Miami Dolphins	**W** 45–21	7–3	Bank of America Stadium	Recap
11	Bye					
12	November 26	at New York Jets	**W** 35–27	8–3	MetLife Stadium	Recap
13	December 3	at **New Orleans Saints**	**L** 21–31	8–4	Mercedes-Benz Superdome	Recap
14	December 10	Minnesota Vikings	**W** 31–24	9–4	Bank of America Stadium	Recap
15	December 17	Green Bay Packers	**W** 31–24	10–4	Bank of America Stadium	Recap
16	December 24	**Tampa Bay Buccaneers**	**W** 22–19	11–4	Bank of America Stadium	Recap
17	December 31	at **Atlanta Falcons**	**L** 10–22	11–5	Mercedes-Benz Stadium	Recap

Note: Intra-division opponents are in bold text.

=== Game summaries ===
==== Week 1: at San Francisco 49ers ====
Week One: Carolina Panthers at San Francisco 49ers – Game summary

Quarter	1	2	3	4	Total
**Panthers**	7	6	10	0	**23**
49ers	0	0	3	0	**3**

at Levi's Stadium, Santa Clara, California

- Date: September 10
- Game time: 4:25 p.m. EDT/1:25 p.m. PDT
- Game weather: 87 °F (31 °C), clear
- Game attendance: 70,178
- Referee: Clete Blakeman
- TV announcers (Fox): Thom Brennaman, Chris Spielman and Peter Schrager
- Recap, Gamebook

Game information

**First quarter**

- CAR – Russell Shepard 40-yard pass from Cam Newton (Graham Gano kick), 3:10. Panthers 7–0. **Drive: 3 plays, 42 yards, 1:35.**

**Second quarter**

- CAR – Graham Gano 39-yard field goal, 3:28. Panthers 10–0. **Drive: 8 plays, 27 yards, 3:04.**
- CAR – Graham Gano 36-yard field goal, 0:05. Panthers 13–0. **Drive: 7 plays, 37 yards, 0:42.**

**Third quarter**

- CAR – Jonathan Stewart 9-yard pass from Cam Newton (Graham Gano kick), 11:32. Panthers 20–0. **Drive: 5 plays, 28 yards, 3:01.**
- CAR – Graham Gano 20-yard field goal, 3:14. Panthers 23–0. **Drive: 11 plays, 40 yards, 6:53.**
- SF – Robbie Gould 44-yard field goal, 0:13. Panthers 23–3. **Drive: 10 plays, 49 yards, 3:03.**

**Fourth quarter**

- No scoring plays.

**Top passers**

- CAR – Cam Newton – 14/25, 171 yards, 2 TD, INT
- SF – Brian Hoyer – 24/35, 193 yards, INT

**Top rushers**

- CAR – Jonathan Stewart – 18 rushes, 65 yards
- SF – Carlos Hyde – 9 rushes, 45 yards

**Top receivers**

- CAR – Russell Shepard – 2 receptions, 53 yards, TD
- SF – Pierre Garcon – 6 receptions, 81 yards

The Panthers started off their season by making their first return to Levi's Stadium since losing to the Denver Broncos in Super Bowl 50. Late in the first quarter Cam Newton threw a 40-yard touchdown to Russell Sheppard followed by a Graham Gano field goal. The Panthers scored six more points in the second quarter with two field goals. In the third Jonathan Stewart scored a touchdown, followed by another Gano field goal. With 3:14 left to go in the third quarter, Gano made his third field goal of the day making the score 23–0. Robbie Gould's kick with thirteen seconds to go gave the 49ers their first points of the game. Neither the Panthers or 49ers scored in the fourth quarter, resulting in Carolina defeating San Francisco 23–3. They improved to 1–0.

==== Week 2: vs. Buffalo Bills ====
Week Two: Buffalo Bills at Carolina Panthers – Game summary

Quarter	1	2	3	4	Total
Bills	0	0	0	3	**3**
**Panthers**	3	3	0	3	**9**

at Bank of America Stadium, Charlotte, North Carolina

- Date: September 17
- Game time: 1:00 pm. EDT
- Game weather: 83 °F (28 °C), sunny
- Game attendance: 74,122
- Referee: Walt Coleman
- TV announcers (CBS): Kevin Harlan and Rich Gannon
- Recap, Gamebook

Game information

**First quarter**

- CAR – Graham Gano 34-yard field goal, 8:54. Panthers 3–0. **Drive: 13 plays, 59 yards, 6:11.**

**Second quarter**

- CAR – Graham Gano 28-yard field goal, 2:06. Panthers 6–0. **Drive: 10 plays, 46 yards, 6:51.**

**Third quarter**

- No scoring plays.

**Fourth quarter**

- BUF – Steven Hauschka 45-yard field goal, 11:15. Panthers 6–3. **Drive: 9 plays, 30 yards, 4:18.**
- CAR – Graham Gano 20-yard field goal, 2:38. Panthers 9–3. **Drive: 15 plays, 73 yards, 8:34.**

**Top passers**

- BUF – Tyrod Taylor – 17/25, 125 yards
- CAR – Cam Newton – 20/32, 228 yards

**Top rushers**

- BUF – Tyrod Taylor – 8 rushes, 55 yards
- CAR – Jonathan Stewart – 15 rushes, 40 yards

**Top receivers**

- BUF – LeSean McCoy – 6 receptions, 34 yards
- CAR – Kelvin Benjamin – 6 receptions, 77 yards

In the Panthers home opener, Carolina's defense allowed only three points for the second straight week, and Graham Gano converted three field goals as the Panthers held on to defeat the Buffalo Bills 9–3 to remain undefeated. With seconds remaining in the game, Tyrod Taylor's 4th-and-11 pass sailed off diving rookie Zay Jones' fingertips, costing them the game winning touchdown. The Panthers improved to 2–0.

==== Week 3: vs. New Orleans Saints ====
Week Three: New Orleans Saints at Carolina Panthers – Game summary

Quarter	1	2	3	4	Total
**Saints**	7	10	7	10	**34**
Panthers	3	3	7	0	**13**

at Bank of America Stadium, Charlotte, North Carolina

- Date: September 24
- Game time: 1:00 pm. EDT
- Game weather: 82 °F (28 °C), sunny
- Game attendance: 73,775
- Referee: Bill Vinovich
- TV announcers (Fox): Kenny Albert, Ronde Barber and Kristina Pink
- Recap, Gamebook

Game information

**First quarter**

- CAR – Graham Gano 32-yard field goal, 6:23. Panthers 3–0. **Drive: 15 plays, 61 yards, 8:41.**
- NO – Michael Thomas 5-yard pass from Drew Brees (Wil Lutz kick), 0:29. Saints 7–3. **Drive: 13 plays, 75 yards, 5:57.**

**Second quarter**

- CAR – Graham Gano 48-yard field goal, 10:52. Saints 7–6. **Drive: 8 plays, 45 yards, 4:36.**
- NO – Brandon Coleman 11-yard pass from Drew Brees (Wil Lutz kick), 5:48. Saints 14–6. **Drive: 4 plays, 24 yards, 2:08.**
- NO – Wil Lutz 33-yard field goal, 0:05. Saints 17–6. **Drive: 10 plays, 54 yards, 4:43.**

**Third quarter**

- NO – Ted Ginn Jr. 40-yard pass from Drew Brees (Wil Lutz kick), 11:18. Saints 24–6. **Drive: 8 plays, 75 yards, 3:51.**
- CAR – Cam Newton 3-yard run (Graham Gano kick), 1:26. Saints 24–13. **Drive: 7 plays, 83 yards, 4:11.**

**Fourth quarter**

- NO – Wil Lutz 50-yard field goal, 12:03. Saints 27–13. **Drive: 7 plays, 44 yards, 4:21.**
- NO – Alvin Kamara 25-yard run (Wil Lutz kick), 4:50. Saints 34–13. **Drive: 4 plays, 35 yards, 2:16.**

**Top passers**

- NO – Drew Brees – 22/29, 220 yards, 3 TD
- CAR – Cam Newton – 17/26, 167 yards, 3 INT

**Top rushers**

- NO – Mark Ingram II – 14 rushes, 56 yards
- CAR – Jonathan Stewart – 12 rushes, 57 yards

**Top receivers**

- NO – Michael Thomas – 7 receptions, 87 yards, TD
- CAR – Christian McCaffrey – 9 receptions, 101 yards

The Saints were too much for the Panthers as they handed them their first loss of the season, 34–13. The Panthers fell to 2–1.

==== Week 4: at New England Patriots ====
Week Four: Carolina Panthers at New England Patriots – Game summary

Quarter	1	2	3	4	Total
**Panthers**	3	14	6	10	**33**
Patriots	3	13	0	14	**30**

at Gillette Stadium, Foxborough, Massachusetts

- Date: October 1
- Game time: 1:00 pm. EDT
- Game weather: 61 °F (16 °C), sunny
- Game attendance: 65,878
- Referee: Jerome Boger
- TV announcers (Fox): Joe Buck, Troy Aikman and Erin Andrews
- Recap, Gamebook

Game information

**First quarter**

- NE – Stephen Gostkowski 41-yard field goal, 11:47. Patriots 3–0. **Drive: 8 plays, 52 yards, 3:13.**
- CAR – Graham Gano 32-yard field goal, 7:41. Tied 3–3. **Drive: 8 plays, 61 yards, 4:06.**

**Second quarter**

- NE – Chris Hogan 2-yard pass from Tom Brady (Stephen Gostkowski kick), 12:39. Patriots 10–3. **Drive: 11 plays, 74 yards, 5:32.**
- CAR – Fozzy Whittaker 28-yard pass from Cam Newton (Graham Gano kick), 9:41. Tied 10–10. **Drive: 6 plays, 75 yards, 2:58.**
- NE – Stephen Gostkowski 35-yard field goal, 4:30. Patriots 13–10. **Drive: 12 plays, 57 yards, 5:11.**
- CAR – Devin Funchess 10-yard pass from Cam Newton (Graham Gano kick), 0:26. Panthers 17–13. **Drive: 9 plays, 84 yards, 4:04.**
- NE – Stephen Gostkowski 58-yard field goal, 0:00. Panthers 17–16. **Drive: 4 plays, 35 yards, 0:26.**

**Third quarter**

- CAR – Devin Funchess 16-yard pass from Cam Newton (kick failed, wide left), 2:47. Panthers 23–16. **Drive: 11 plays, 68 yards, 6:30.**

**Fourth quarter**

- CAR – Cam Newton 7-yard run (Graham Gano kick), 12:58. Panthers 30–16. **Drive: 6 plays, 64 yards, 2:50.**
- NE – Dion Lewis 8-yard run (Stephen Gostkowski kick), 8:46. Panthers 30–23. **Drive: 9 plays, 75 yards, 4:12.**
- NE – Danny Amendola 1-yard pass from Tom Brady (Stephen Gostkowski kick), 3:09. Tied 30–30. **Drive: 10 plays, 49 yards, 4:18.**
- CAR – Graham Gano 48-yard field goal, 0:00. Panthers 33–30. **Drive: 10 plays, 46 yards, 3:09.**

**Top passers**

- CAR – Cam Newton – 22/29, 316 yards, 3 TD, INT
- NE – Tom Brady – 32/45, 307 yards, 2 TD

**Top rushers**

- CAR – Jonathan Stewart – 14 rushes, 68 yards
- NE – Mike Gillislee – 12 rushes, 49 yards

**Top receivers**

- CAR – Kelvin Benjamin – 4 receptions, 104 yards
- NE – Rob Gronkowski – 4 receptions, 80 yards

In the first quarter, both Carolina and New England managed to only kick field goals. New England scored the first touchdown in the second quarter. Carolina answered with a touchdown by Fozzy Whittaker which tied the game again. The Patriots later scored with another Stephen Gostkowski field goal. Devin Funchess caught a ten-yard pass from Newton to give the Panthers a 17–13 lead. With four seconds remaining in the half Gostkowski kicked a 58-yard field goal, making the halftime score 17–16. Carolina had the only score in the third quarter with a Funchess touchdown but Gano missed the extra point. The Panthers started the fourth quarter with Cam Newton rushing for a touchdown, increasing the lead to 30–16. New England managed to score twice, tying the game at 30. With seconds left, Graham Gano kicked the game winning field goal. The Panthers won 33–30 (their first win in Foxborough since 1995) and improved to 3–1, which would also be their record against the Patriots since losing to them in Super Bowl XXXVIII in 2004.

==== Week 5: at Detroit Lions ====
Week Five: Carolina Panthers at Detroit Lions – Game summary

Quarter	1	2	3	4	Total
**Panthers**	3	14	10	0	**27**
Lions	3	7	0	14	**24**

at Ford Field, Detroit, Michigan

- Date: October 8
- Game time: 1:00 pm. EDT
- Game weather: Played indoors (dome stadium)
- Game attendance: 64,288
- Referee: Craig Wrolstad
- TV announcers (Fox): Kenny Albert, Charles Davis and Pam Oliver
- Recap, Gamebook

Game information

**First quarter**

- DET – Matt Prater 30-yard field goal. Lions 3–0. **Drive: 8 plays, 63 yards, 3:28.**
- CAR – Graham Gano 21-yard field goal. Tied 3–3. **Drive: 6 plays, 61 yards, 3:01.**

**Second quarter**

- DET – Zach Zenner 1-yard run. (Matt Prater kick). Lions 10–3. **Drive: 9 plays, 78 yards, 5:19.**
- CAR – Christian McCaffrey 6-yard pass from Cam Newton. (Graham Gano kick). Tied 10–10. **Drive: 5 plays, 75 yards, 2:28.**
- CAR – Devin Funchess 10-yard pass from Cam Newton. (Graham Gano kick). Panthers 17–10. **Drive: 11 plays, 73 yards, 4:10.**

**Third quarter**

- CAR – Kelvin Benjamin 31-yard pass from Cam Newton. (Graham Gano kick). Panthers 24–10. **Drive: 8 plays, 75 yards, 4:17.**
- CAR – Graham Gano 44-yard field goal. Panthers 27–10. **Drive: 4 plays, 3 yards, 1:09.**

**Fourth quarter**

- DET – Darren Fells 4-yard pass from Matthew Stafford (Matt Prater kick). Panthers 27–17. **Drive: 8 plays, 69 yards, 3:10.**
- DET – Darren Fells 20-yard pass from Matthew Stafford (Matt Prater kick). Panthers 27–24. **Drive: 6 plays, 53 yards, 0:51.**

**Top passers**

- CAR – Cam Newton – 26/33, 355 yards, 3 TDs
- DET – Matthew Stafford – 23/35, 229 yards, 2 TDs

**Top rushers**

- CAR – Jonathan Stewart – 18 rushes, 21 yards
- DET – Ameer Abdullah – 10 rushes, 31 yards

**Top receivers**

- CAR – Ed Dickson – 5 receptions, 175 yards
- DET – Marvin Jones – 6 receptions, 54 yards

Carolina and Detroit were tied with 3 points apiece at the end of the first quarter. Early in the second, the Lions scored a touchdown, making the score 3–10. The Panthers answered back with a Christian McCaffery touchdown, tying the game again. Devin Funchess scored a touchdown towards the end of the quarter, giving the Panthers a 17–10 lead. The Panthers started the second half with Cam Newton throwing a 31-yard touchdown pass to Kelvin Benjamin. Gano later made a 44-yard field goal to extend the lead to 27–10 going into the fourth quarter. Matthew Stafford threw a touchdown a pass to Fells, cutting the Panthers lead to 27–17. The Lions scored again with another Fells touchdown. The Panthers held on and won 27–24, improving to 4–1.

==== Week 6: vs. Philadelphia Eagles ====
Week Six: Philadelphia Eagles at Carolina Panthers – Game summary

Quarter	1	2	3	4	Total
**Eagles**	3	7	11	7	**28**
Panthers	3	7	6	7	**23**

at Bank of America Stadium, Charlotte, North Carolina

- Date: October 12
- Game time: 8:25 pm. EDT
- Game weather: 72 °F (22 °C), cloudy
- Game attendance: 74,373
- Referee: Pete Morelli
- TV announcers (CBS/NFLN/Amazon Video): Jim Nantz, Tony Romo, Tracy Wolfson and Jay Feely
- Recap, Gamebook

Game information

**First quarter**

- PHI – Jake Elliott 50-yard field goal, 6:57. Eagles 3–0. **Drive: 11 plays, 63 yards, 5:18.**
- CAR – Graham Gano 39-yard field goal, 2:17. Tie 3–3. **Drive: 9 plays, 33 yards, 4:40.**

**Second quarter**

- CAR – Cam Newton 16-yard rush (Graham Gano kick), 10:34. Panthers 10–3. **Drive: 4 plays, 43 yards, 1:59.**
- PHI – Zach Ertz 1-yard pass from Carson Wentz (Jake Elliott kick), 2:32. Tie 10–10. **Drive: 7 plays, 12 yards, 3:56.**

**Third quarter**

- PHI – Zach Ertz 17-yard pass from Carson Wentz (LeGarrette Blount rush), 13:59. Eagles 18–10. **Drive: 2 plays, 17 yards, 0:08.**
- CAR – Graham Gano 20-yard field goal, 11:19. Eagles 18–13. **Drive: 8 plays, 23 yards, 2:40.**
- PHI – Jake Elliott 48-yard field goal, 8:02. Eagles 21–13. **Drive: 7 plays, 44 yards, 3:17.**
- CAR – Graham Gano 46-yard field goal, 3:23. Eagles 21–16. **Drive: 7 plays, 37 yards, 2:38.**

**Fourth quarter**

- PHI – Nelson Agholor 24-yard pass from Carson Wentz (Jake Elliott kick), 14:55. Eagles 28–16. **Drive: 6 plays, 75 yards, 3:28.**
- CAR – Christian McCaffrey 1-yard pass from Cam Newton (Graham Gano kick), 8:04. Eagles 28–23. **Drive: 13 plays, 75 yards, 6:51.**

**Top passers**

- PHI – Carson Wentz – 15/27, 217 yards, 3 TD
- CAR – Cam Newton – 22/39, 183 yards, TD, 3 INT

**Top rushers**

- PHI – LeGarrette Blount – 11 rushes, 57 yards
- CAR – Cam Newton – 11 rushes, 71 yards, TD

**Top receivers**

- PHI – Alshon Jeffery – 3 receptions, 66 yards
- CAR – Kelvin Benjamin – 7 receptions, 80 yards

On Thursday Night Football, both teams wore their Color Rush uniforms. The Eagles beat the Panthers 28–23, and Carolina fell to 4–2.

==== Week 7: at Chicago Bears ====
Week Seven: Carolina Panthers at Chicago Bears – Game summary

Quarter	1	2	3	4	Total
Panthers	0	3	0	0	**3**
**Bears**	7	10	0	0	**17**

at Soldier Field, Chicago, Illinois

- Date: October 22
- Game time: 1:00 pm. EDT/12:00 p.m. CDT
- Game weather: 70 °F (21 °C), cloudy with periods of rain, thunder possible
- Game attendance: 61,256
- Referee: Walt Anderson
- TV announcers (CBS): Ian Eagle, Dan Fouts and Evan Washburn
- Recap, Gamebook

Game information

**First quarter**

- CHI – Eddie Jackson 75-yard fumble return (Connor Barth kick), 8:59. Bears 7–0.

**Second quarter**

- CHI – Eddie Jackson 76-yard interception return (Connor Barth kick), 12:28. Bears 14–0.
- CAR – Graham Gano 36-yard field goal, 3:18. Bears 14–3. **Drive: 16 plays, 56 yards, 9:10.**
- CHI – Connor Barth 19-yard field goal, 1:10. Bears 17–3. **Drive: 5 plays, 74 yards, 2:08.**

**Third quarter**

- No scoring plays.

**Fourth quarter**

- No scoring plays.

**Top passers**

- CAR – Cam Newton – 21/34, 211 yards, 2 INT
- CHI – Mitchell Trubisky – 4/7, 107 yards

**Top rushers**

- CAR – Cam Newton – 9 rushes, 50 yards
- CHI – Jordan Howard – 21 rushes, 65 yards

**Top receivers**

- CAR – Christian McCaffrey – 7 receptions, 36 yards
- CHI – Zach Miller – 2 receptions, 29 yards

The Panthers lost for a second straight week by managing to score only one field goal in Chicago. The Bears beat Carolina 17–3, and they fell to 4–3.

==== Week 8: at Tampa Bay Buccaneers ====
Week Eight: Carolina Panthers at Tampa Bay Buccaneers – Game summary

Quarter	1	2	3	4	Total
**Panthers**	7	3	0	7	**17**
Buccaneers	0	0	3	0	**3**

at Raymond James Stadium, Tampa, Florida

- Date: October 29
- Game time: 1:00 pm. EDT
- Game weather: 63 °F (17 °C), cloudy
- Game attendance: 58,545
- Referee: Walt Coleman
- TV announcers (Fox): Chris Myers, Daryl Johnston and Laura Okmin
- Recap, Gamebook

Game information

**First quarter**

- CAR – Jonathan Stewart 1-yard run (Graham Gano kick), 1:34. Panthers 7–0. **Drive: 17 plays, 82 yards, 8:38.**

**Second quarter**

- CAR – Graham Gano 28-yard field goal, 0:17. Panthers 10–0. **Drive: 9 plays, 41 yards, 2:11.**

**Third quarter**

- TB – Patrick Murray 41-yard field goal, 4:49. Panthers 10–3. **Drive: 8 plays, 31 yards, 3:27.**

**Fourth quarter**

- CAR – Kelvin Benjamin 25-yard pass from Cam Newton (Graham Gano kick), 8:48. Panthers 17–3. **Drive: 5 plays, 48 yards, 2:44.**

**Top passers**

- CAR – Cam Newton – 18/32, 154 yards, TD, INT
- TB – Jameis Winston – 21/38, 210 yards, 2 INT

**Top rushers**

- CAR – Cam Newton – 11 rushes, 44 yards
- TB – Doug Martin – 18 rushes, 71 yards

**Top receivers**

- CAR – Christian McCaffrey – 5 receptions, 49 yards
- TB – Mike Evans – 5 receptions, 60 yards

The Panthers bounced back after a two-week losing streak, and beat their division rivals 17–3. Carolina improved to 5–3.

==== Week 9: vs. Atlanta Falcons ====
Week Nine: Atlanta Falcons at Carolina Panthers – Game summary

Quarter	1	2	3	4	Total
Falcons	10	0	0	7	**17**
**Panthers**	0	14	6	0	**20**

at Bank of America Stadium, Charlotte, North Carolina

- Date: November 5
- Game time: 1:00 pm. EST
- Game weather: 61 °F (16 °C), cloudy
- Game attendance: 74,244
- Referee: Tony Corrente
- TV announcers (Fox): Joe Buck, Troy Aikman and Erin Andrews
- Recap, Gamebook

Game information

**First quarter**

- ATL – Matt Bryant 53-yard field goal, 12:16. Falcons 3–0. **Drive: 5 plays, 40 yards, 2:44.**
- ATL – Mohamed Sanu 6-yard pass from Matt Ryan (Matt Bryant kick), 3:30. Falcons 10–0. **Drive: 8 plays, 61 yards, 4:38.**

**Second quarter**

- CAR – Christian McCaffrey 4-yard run (Graham Gano kick), 1:55. Falcons 10–7. **Drive: 6 plays, 50 yards, 2:35.**
- CAR – Cam Newton 9-yard run (Graham Gano kick), 0:23. Panthers 14–10. **Drive: 4 plays, 31 yards, 0:52.**

**Third quarter**

- CAR – Graham Gano 31-yard field goal, 9:03. Panthers 17–10. **Drive: 10 plays, 62 yards, 5:57.**
- CAR – Graham Gano 45-yard field goal, 1:38. Panthers 20–10. **Drive: 9 plays, 45 yards, 5:48.**

**Fourth quarter**

- ATL – Tevin Coleman 19-yard pass from Matt Ryan (Matt Bryant kick), 3:25. Panthers 20–17. **Drive: 7 plays, 92 yards, 2:01.**

**Top passers**

- ATL – Matt Ryan – 24/38, 313 yards, 2 TD, INT
- CAR – Cam Newton – 13/24, 137 yards

**Top rushers**

- ATL – Devonta Freeman – 11 rushes, 46 yards
- CAR – Cam Newton – 9 rushes, 86 yards, TD

**Top receivers**

- ATL – Julio Jones – 6 receptions, 118 yards
- CAR – Devin Funchess – 5 receptions, 86 yards

This was the Panthers' first game without wide receiver Kelvin Benjamin, who was traded to Buffalo days earlier. In this game, neither team scored in the same quarter. The Falcons were the only team to score in the first quarter, and led 10–0 going into the second. It was vice versa in the second, as Carolina scored two touchdowns for a four-point lead at the half. Atlanta was scoreless again in the third but Carolina scored on two Graham Gano field goals, making it 20–10. Atlanta had the only score of the fourth quarter, but Carolina survived and won 20–17. Their record improved to 6–3.

==== Week 10: vs. Miami Dolphins ====
Week Ten: Miami Dolphins at Carolina Panthers – Game summary

Quarter	1	2	3	4	Total
Dolphins	0	7	7	7	**21**
**Panthers**	3	14	21	7	**45**

at Bank of America Stadium, Charlotte, North Carolina

- Date: November 13
- Game time: 8:30 pm. EST
- Game weather: 49 °F (9 °C), clear
- Game attendance: 72,790
- Referee: Gene Steratore
- TV announcers (ESPN): Sean McDonough, Jon Gruden and Lisa Salters
- Recap, Gamebook

Game information

**First quarter**

- CAR – Graham Gano 40-yard field goal, 1:50. Panthers 3–0. **Drive: 11 plays, 42 yards, 5:33.**

**Second quarter**

- CAR – Christian McCaffrey 4-yard run (Graham Gano kick), 6:59. Panthers 10–0. **Drive: 12 plays, 85 yards, 6:17.**
- MIA – Julius Thomas 2-yard pass from Jay Cutler (Cody Parkey kick), 2:12. Panthers 10–7. **Drive: 10 plays, 75 yards, 4:47.**
- CAR – Ed Dickson 7-yard pass from Cam Newton (Graham Gano kick), 0:19. Panthers 17–7. **Drive: 4 plays, 20 yards, 0:22.**

**Third quarter**

- CAR – Devin Funchess 28-yard pass from Cam Newton (Graham Gano kick), 11:50. Panthers 24–7. **Drive: 8 plays, 78 yards, 3:10.**
- CAR – Cameron Artis-Payne 12-yard run (Graham Gano kick), 7:15. Panthers 31–7. **Drive: 4 plays, 48 yards, 2:19.**
- MIA – Kenyan Drake 66-yard run (Cody Parkey kick), 5:47. Panthers 31–14. **Drive: 3 plays, 75 yards, 1:28.**
- CAR – Christian McCaffrey 2-yard pass from Cam Newton (Graham Gano kick), 3:07. Panthers 38–14. **Drive: 4 plays, 87 yards, 2:40.**

**Fourth quarter**

- CAR – Devin Funchess 32-yard pass from Cam Newton (Graham Gano kick), 8:20. Panthers 45–14. **Drive: 11 plays, 83 yards, 6:43.**
- MIA – Jarvis Landry 9-yard pass from Jay Cutler (Cody Parkey kick), 4:05. Panthers 45–21. **Drive: 10 plays, 75 yards, 4:15.**

**Top passers**

- MIA – Jay Cutler – 22/37, 213 yards, 2 TD, INT
- CAR – Cam Newton – 21/35, 254 yards, 4 TD

**Top rushers**

- MIA – Kenyan Drake – 7 rushes, 82 yards, TD
- CAR – Jonathan Stewart – 17 rushes, 110 yards

**Top receivers**

- MIA – DeVante Parker – 6 receptions, 66 yards
- CAR – Devin Funchess – 5 receptions, 92 yards, 2 TD

In this Monday Night Football game, the Panthers beat the Dolphins 45–21 and improved to 7–3.

==== Week 12: at New York Jets ====
Week Twelve: Carolina Panthers at New York Jets – Game summary

Quarter	1	2	3	4	Total
**Panthers**	3	9	6	17	**35**
Jets	3	7	7	10	**27**

at MetLife Stadium, East Rutherford, New Jersey

- Date: November 26
- Game time: 1:00 pm. EST
- Game weather: 47 °F (8 °C), sunny
- Game attendance: 77,562
- Referee: Carl Cheffers
- TV announcers (Fox): Thom Brennaman, Chris Spielman and Peter Schrager
- Recap, Gamebook

Game information

**First quarter**

- CAR – Graham Gano 40-yard field goal, 9:55. Panthers 3–0. **Drive: 12 plays, 48 yards, 5:05.**
- NYJ – Chandler Catanzaro 31-yard field goal, 5:13. Tied 3–3. **Drive: 10 plays, 55 yards, 4:42.**

**Second quarter**

- CAR – Cam Newton 1-yard run (kick failed), 10:02. Panthers 9–3. **Drive: 8 plays, 86 yards, 4:14.**
- CAR – Graham Gano 33-yard field goal, 3:59. Panthers 12–3. **Drive: 5 plays, 34 yards, 2:11.**
- NYJ – Robby Anderson 33-yard pass from Josh McCown (Chandler Catanzaro kick), 1:12. Panthers 12–10. **Drive: 6 plays, 65 yards, 1:00.**

**Third quarter**

- NYJ – Robby Anderson 54-yard pass from Josh McCown (Chandler Catanzaro kick), 5:41. Jets 17–12. **Drive: 2 plays, 68 yards, 0:37.**
- CAR – Jonathan Stewart 2-yard run (pass failed), 1:12. Panthers 18–17. **Drive: 9 plays, 75 yards, 4:29.**

**Fourth quarter**

- NYJ – Chandler Catanzaro 19-yard field goal, 14:01. Jets 20–18. **Drive: 10 plays, 74 yards, 2:11.**
- CAR – Luke Kuechly 34-yard fumble return (Cam Newton run), 12:05. Panthers 26–20.
- CAR – Kaelin Clay 60-yard punt return (pass failed), 9:54. Panthers 32–20.
- NYJ – Jermaine Kearse 3-yard pass from Josh McCown (Chandler Catanzaro kick), 5:32. Panthers 32–27. **Drive: 8 plays, 75 yards, 4:22.**
- CAR – Graham Gano 45-yard field goal, 0:21. Panthers 35–27. **Drive: 11 plays, 48 yards, 5:11.**

**Top passers**

- CAR – Cam Newton – 11/28, 168 yards
- NYJ – Josh McCown – 19/36, 307 yards, 3 TD

**Top rushers**

- CAR – Christian McCaffrey – 7 rushes, 62 yards
- NYJ – Bilal Powell – 9 rushes, 34 yards

**Top receivers**

- CAR – Devin Funchess – 7 receptions, 108 yards
- NYJ – Jermaine Kearse – 7 receptions, 105 yards, TD

In the first quarter Carolina and New York scored only a field goal each. In the second quarter, Cam Newton scored a 1-yard touchdown but Graham Gano missed the extra point. Gano redeemed himself with another field goal, giving the Panthers a nine-point lead. Robby Anderson caught a 33-yard pass from Josh McCown, plus the extra point from Chandler Catanzaro, and Carolina led, 12–10. In the third New York scored a touchdown, and Jets led by 17–12. But Carolina answered with a Jonathan Stewart touchdown and took an 18–17 lead. Early in the fourth Catanzaro kicked a field goal, putting the Jets back on top, 20–18. Later the Panthers blitzed McCown and forced a fumble, which was recovered by Luke Kuechly who recovered it for a 34-yard touchdown. The Jets punted after their next drive fizzled and Kaelin Clay returned it 60 yards, making the score 32–20. Jermaine Kearse scored a touchdown for the Jets, and Catanzaro's extra point cut the Panthers' lead to 5. With 0:21 to go in the fourth quarter, Gano kicked a field goal and Carolina won by a final score of 35–27. The Panthers record improved to 8–3 and they swept the AFC East. Their win knocked the Jets and Giants out of playoff contention.

==== Week 13: at New Orleans Saints ====
Week Thirteen: Carolina Panthers at New Orleans Saints – Game summary

Quarter	1	2	3	4	Total
Panthers	7	7	0	7	**21**
**Saints**	7	14	7	3	**31**

at Mercedes-Benz Superdome, New Orleans, Louisiana

- Date: December 3
- Game time: 4:25 pm. EST/3:25 pm. CST
- Game weather: Played indoors (dome stadium)
- Game attendance: 73,171
- Referee: John Hussey
- TV announcers (Fox): Joe Buck, Troy Aikman and Erin Andrews
- Recap, Gamebook

Game information

**First quarter**

- NO – Alvin Kamara 2-yard run (Wil Lutz kick), 10:15. Saints 7–0. **Drive: 11 plays, 70 yards, 4:45.**
- CAR – Jonathan Stewart 2-yard run (Graham Gano kick), 5:09. Tied 7–7. **Drive: 10 plays, 75 yards, 5:06.**

**Second quarter**

- NO – Mark Ingram II 3-yard run (Wil Lutz kick), 11:32. Saints 14–7. **Drive: 3 plays, 84 yards, 1:36.**
- NO – Michael Thomas 10-yard pass from Drew Brees (Wil Lutz kick), 7:21. Saints 21–7. **Drive: 6 plays, 31 yards, 3:18.**
- CAR – Christian McCaffrey 21-yard pass from Cam Newton (Graham Gano kick), 1:56. Saints 21–14. **Drive: 4 plays, 45 yards, 1:54.**

**Third quarter**

- NO – Alvin Kamara 20-yard run (Wil Lutz kick), 8:10. Saints 28–14. **Drive: 8 plays, 67 yards, 5:04.**

**Fourth quarter**

- NO – Wil Lutz 31-yard field goal, 6:08. Saints 31–14. **Drive: 6 plays, 34 yards, 2:47.**
- CAR – Devin Funchess 24-yard pass from Cam Newton (Graham Gano kick), 3:57. Saints 31–21. **Drive: 5 plays, 75 yards, 2:11.**

**Top passers**

- CAR – Cam Newton – 17/27, 183 yards, 2 TD
- NO – Drew Brees – 25/34, 269 yards, TD

**Top rushers**

- CAR – Cam Newton – 6 rushes, 51 yards
- NO – Mark Ingram II – 14 rushes, 85 yards, TD

**Top receivers**

- CAR – Christian McCaffrey – 5 receptions, 33 yards, TD
- NO – Mark Ingram II – 6 receptions, 37 yards

The Panthers and Saints were tied at 7–7 going into the second quarter. Mark Ingram II scored a touchdown with a Wil Lutz extra point, and the Saints led by seven. The Saintsd score again to lead by 14. At the end of the second Christian McCaffery scored a touchdown, and with the extra point by Graham Gano, Carolina was down by seven at the half. Alvin Kamara scored a touchdown (Lutz kick) in the third, again increasing New Orleans' lead to 14 points. In the fourth quarter New Orleans scored 3 and Carolina scored 7. The Saints were too much for Carolina and won 31–21. Carolina fell to 8–4.

==== Week 14: vs. Minnesota Vikings ====
Week Fourteen: Minnesota Vikings at Carolina Panthers – Game summary

Quarter	1	2	3	4	Total
Vikings	7	6	0	11	**24**
**Panthers**	7	7	10	7	**31**

at Bank of America Stadium, Charlotte, North Carolina

- Date: December 10
- Game time: 1:00 pm. EST
- Game weather: 41 °F (5 °C), sunny
- Game attendance: 73,728
- Referee: Terry McAulay
- TV announcers (CBS): Jim Nantz, Tony Romo and Tracy Wolfson
- Recap, Gamebook

Game information

**First quarter**

- CAR – Jonathan Stewart 60-yard run (Graham Gano kick), 11:06. Panthers 7–0. **Drive: 3 plays, 69 yards, 1:35.**
- MIN – Kyle Rudolph 18-yard pass from Case Keenum (Kai Forbath kick), 6:33. Tied 7–7. **Drive: 10 plays, 75 yards, 4:27.**

**Second quarter**

- CAR – Jonathan Stewart 1-yard run (Graham Gano kick), 14:22. Panthers 14–7. **Drive: 14 plays, 89 yards, 7:12.**
- MIN – Kai Forbath 30-yard field goal, 5:08. Panthers 14–10. **Drive: 9 plays, 62 yards, 4:03.**
- MIN – Kai Forbath 22-yard field goal, 0:09. Panthers 14–13. **Drive: 11 plays, 64 yards, 2:26.**

**Third quarter**

- CAR – Devin Funchess 18-yard pass from Cam Newton (Graham Gano kick), 8:51. Panthers 21–13. **Drive: 10 plays, 75 yards, 6:18.**
- CAR – Graham Gano 41-yard field goal, 6:57. Panthers 24–13. **Drive: 4 plays, 8 yards, 1:37.**

**Fourth quarter**

- MIN – Adam Thielen 52-yard pass from Case Keenum (Blake Bell pass from Case Keenum), 5:47. Panthers 24–21 **Drive: 4 plays, 73 yards, 1:28.**
- MIN – Kai Forbath 27-yard field goal, 3:11. Tied 24–24. **Drive: 4 plays, −3 yards, 1:29.**
- CAR – Jonathan Stewart 1-yard run (Graham Gano kick), 1:50. Panthers 31–24. **Drive: 5 plays, 75 yards, 1:20.**

**Top passers**

- MIN – Case Keenum – 27/44, 280 yards, 2 TD, 2 INT
- CAR – Cam Newton – 13/25, 137 yards, TD, INT

**Top rushers**

- MIN – Jerick McKinnon – 7 rushes, 46 yards
- CAR – Jonathan Stewart – 16 rushes, 103 yards, 3 TD

**Top receivers**

- MIN – Adam Thielen – 6 receptions, 105 yards, TD
- CAR – Devin Funchess – 3 receptions, 59 yards, TD

In a game featuring two of the NFC's best teams, Carolina was able to hold off the Vikings and win 31–24. The Panthers improved to 9–4.

==== Week 15: vs. Green Bay Packers ====
Week Fifteen: Green Bay Packers at Carolina Panthers – Game summary

Quarter	1	2	3	4	Total
Packers	7	7	3	7	**24**
**Panthers**	7	3	14	7	**31**

at Bank of America Stadium, Charlotte, North Carolina

- Date: December 17
- Game time: 1:00 pm. EST
- Game weather: 51 °F (11 °C), partly cloudy
- Game attendance: 74,447
- Referee: Craig Wrolstad
- TV announcers (Fox): Joe Buck, Troy Aikman and Erin Andrews
- Recap, Gamebook

Game information

First quarter

- CAR – Christian McCaffrey 7-yard pass from Cam Newton (Graham Gano kick), 6:02. Panthers 7–0. **Drive: 15 plays, 85 yards, 7:35.**
- GB – Davante Adams 13-yard pass from Aaron Rodgers (Mason Crosby kick), 0:04. Tied 7–7. **Drive: 11 plays, 75 yards, 5:57.**

Second quarter

- CAR – Graham Gano 33-yard field goal, 9:06. Panthers 10–7. **Drive: 12 plays, 61 yards, 5:58.**
- GB – Randall Cobb 33-yard pass from Aaron Rodgers (Mason Crosby kick), 0:39. Packers 14–10. **Drive: 4 plays, 58 yards, 1:29.**

Third quarter

- CAR – Greg Olsen 30-yard pass from Cam Newton (Graham Gano kick), 11:39. Panthers 17–14. **Drive: 7 plays, 73 yards, 3:26.**
- CAR – Damiere Byrd 18-yard pass from Cam Newton (Graham Gano kick), 7:28. Panthers 24–14. **Drive: 7 plays, 49 yards, 3:28.**
- GB – Mason Crosby 28-yard field goal, 1:27. Panthers 24–17. **Drive: 12 plays, 47 yards, 3:51.**

Fourth quarter

- CAR – Damiere Byrd 13-yard pass from Cam Newton (Graham Gano kick), 12:29. Panthers 31–17. **Drive: 8 plays, 75 yards, 3:59.**
- GB – Richard Rodgers 24-yard pass from Aaron Rodgers (Mason Crosby kick), 2:48. Panthers 31–24. **Drive: 6 plays, 76 yards, 1:11.**
- GB – Aaron Rodgers – 26/45, 290 yards, 3 TD, 3 INT
- CAR – Cam Newton – 20/31, 242 yards, 4 TD

Top rushers

- GB – Aaron Jones – 3 rushes, 47 yards
- CAR – Christian McCaffrey – 12 rushes, 63 yards

Top receivers

- GB – Randall Cobb – 7 receptions, 84 yards, TD
- CAR – Greg Olsen – 9 receptions, 116 yards, TD

The Panthers spoiled Packers quarterback Aaron Rodgers' return by intercepting three passes and winning 31–24. They also improved to 10–4, finishing 3-1 against the NFC North. A few hours after the game ended, owner Jerry Richardson announced he was putting the Panthers up for sale. This marked Carolina's last win over Green Bay until 2025.

==== Week 16: vs. Tampa Bay Buccaneers ====
Week Sixteen: Tampa Bay Buccaneers at Carolina Panthers – Game summary

Quarter	1	2	3	4	Total
Buccaneers	3	6	7	3	**19**
**Panthers**	3	9	3	7	**22**

at Bank of America Stadium, Charlotte, North Carolina

- Date: December 24
- Game time: 1:00 pm. EST
- Game weather: 55 °F (13 °C), cloudy
- Game attendance: 71,463
- Referee: Jerome Boger
- TV announcers (Fox): Kenny Albert, Ronde Barber and Kristina Pink
- Recap, Gamebook

Game information

**First quarter**

- CAR – Graham Gano 25-yard field goal, 8:13. Panthers 3–0. **Drive: 7 plays, 26 yards, 3:55.**
- TB – Patrick Murray 31-yard field goal, 2:24. Tied 3–3. **Drive: 11 plays, 63 yards, 5:49.**

**Second quarter**

- CAR – Graham Gano 28-yard field goal, 8:38. Panthers 6–3. **Drive: 10 plays, 71 yards, 4:58.**
- TB – Patrick Murray 41-yard field goal, 2:58. Tied 6–6. **Drive: 6 plays, 61 yards, 2:18.**
- CAR – Damiere Byrd 103-yard kickoff return (kick failed), 2:43. Panthers 12–6.
- TB – Patrick Murray 21-yard field goal, 0:02. Panthers 12–9. **Drive: 9 plays, 72 yards, 2:41.**

**Third quarter**

- TB – Bobo Wilson 18-yard pass from Jameis Winston (Patrick Murray kick), 10:27. Buccaneers 16–12. **Drive: 3 plays, 49 yards, 1:01.**
- CAR – Graham Gano 30-yard field goal, 4:49. Buccaneers 16–15. **Drive: 12 plays, 68 yards, 5:38.**

**Fourth quarter**

- TB – Patrick Murray 26-yard field goal, 14:57. Buccaneers 19–15. **Drive: 10 plays, 67 yards, 4:52.**
- CAR – Cam Newton 2-yard run (Graham Gano kick), 0:35. Panthers 22–19. **Drive: 10 plays, 59 yards, 2:25.**

**Top passers**

- TB – Jameis Winston – 21/27, 367 yards, TD
- CAR – Cam Newton – 16/25, 160 yards, INT

**Top rushers**

- TB – Peyton Barber – 13 rushes, 51 yards
- CAR – Cam Newton – 14 rushes, 52 yards, TD

**Top receivers**

- TB – Mike Evans – 6 receptions, 107 yards
- CAR – Brenton Bersin – 3 receptions, 45 yards

With the close win, the Panthers clinched a playoff spot for the fourth time in five years. They also improved to 11–4 (3-2 against the NFC South) and finished 6-2 at home.

==== Week 17: at Atlanta Falcons ====
Week Seventeen: Carolina Panthers at Atlanta Falcons – Game summary

Quarter	1	2	3	4	Total
Panthers	0	7	0	3	**10**
**Falcons**	7	0	6	9	**22**

at Mercedes-Benz Stadium, Atlanta, Georgia

- Date: December 31
- Game time: 4:25 pm. EST
- Game weather: Played indoors (retractable roof closed)
- Game attendance: 74,141
- Referee: Bill Vinovich
- TV announcers (Fox): Joe Buck, Troy Aikman and Erin Andrews
- Recap, Gamebook

Game information

**First quarter**

- ATL – Devonta Freeman 19-yard pass from Matt Ryan (Matt Bryant kick), 10:39. Falcons 7–0. **Drive: 10 plays, 75 yards, 4:28.**

**Second quarter**

- CAR – Devin Funchess 4-yard pass from Cam Newton (Graham Gano kick), 0:55. Tied 7–7. **Drive: 16 plays, 78 yards, 8:25.**

**Third quarter**

- ATL – Matt Bryant 30-yard field goal, 6:35. Falcons 10–7. **Drive: 13 plays, 68 yards, 6:55.**
- ATL – Matt Bryant 42-yard field goal, 3:49. Falcons 13–7. **Drive: 5 plays, 15 yards, 2:00.**

**Fourth quarter**

- ATL – Matt Bryant 30-yard field goal, 14:15. Falcons 16–7. **Drive: 8 plays, 60 yards, 3:26.**
- CAR – Graham Gano 42-yard field goal, 10:38. Falcons 16–10. **Drive: 7 plays, 51 yards, 3:37.**
- ATL – Matt Bryant 56-yard field goal, 6:43. Falcons 19–10. **Drive: 8 plays, 37 yards, 3:57.**
- ATL – Matt Bryant 33-yard field goal, 2:31. Falcons 22–10. **Drive: 4 plays, 8 yards, 1:41.**

**Top passers**

- CAR – Cam Newton – 14/34, 180 yards, TD, 3 INT
- ATL – Matt Ryan – 28/45, 317 yards, TD

**Top rushers**

- CAR – Cam Newton – 11 rushes, 59 yards
- ATL – Tevin Coleman – 11 rushes, 23 yards
- ATL – Devonta Freeman – 11 rushes, 23 yards

**Top receivers**

- CAR – Devin Funchess – 2 receptions, 48 yards, TD
- ATL – Devonta Freeman – 9 receptions, 85 yards, TD

The Panthers went to Atlanta with a chance to win the NFC South. If Tampa Bay beat New Orleans and Carolina won, the Panthers would win the title. Despite Tampa's victory over the Saints, the Panthers lost 22–10, making the Saints NFC South champions. The Panthers ended the regular season 11–5 and 3-3 against the NFC South. They also finished 5-3 on the road.

=== Standings ===
==== Division ====
NFC South
	W	L	T	PCT	DIV	CONF	PF	PA	STK
^{(4)} New Orleans Saints	11	5	0	.688	4–2	8–4	448	326	L1
^{(5)} Carolina Panthers	11	5	0	.688	3–3	7–5	363	327	L1
^{(6)} Atlanta Falcons	10	6	0	.625	4–2	9–3	353	315	W1
Tampa Bay Buccaneers	5	11	0	.313	1–5	3–9	335	382	W1

==== Conference ====
NFC
#	Team	Division	W	L	T	PCT	DIV	CONF	SOS	SOV	STK
**Division leaders**
1 (Note: Philadelphia claimed the No. 1 seed over Minnesota based on winning percentage vs. common opponents. Philadelphia's cumulative record against Carolina, Chicago, the Los Angeles Rams and Washington was 5–0, compared to Minnesota's 4–1 cumulative record against the same four teams.)	Philadelphia Eagles	East	13	3	0	.813	5–1	10–2	.461	.433	L1
2	Minnesota Vikings	North	13	3	0	.813	5–1	10–2	.492	.447	W3
3 (Note: LA Rams claimed the No. 3 seed over New Orleans based on head-to-head victory.)	Los Angeles Rams	West	11	5	0	.688	4–2	7–5	.504	.460	L1
4 (Note: New Orleans clinched the NFC South division over Carolina based on head-to-head sweep.)	New Orleans Saints	South	11	5	0	.688	4–2	8–4	.535	.483	L1
**Wild Cards**
5	Carolina Panthers	South	11	5	0	.688	3–3	7–5	.539	.500	L1
6	Atlanta Falcons	South	10	6	0	.625	4–2	9–3	.543	.475	W1
**Did not qualify for the postseason**
7 (Note: Detroit finished ahead of Dallas and Seattle based on conference record, while Seattle finished ahead of Dallas based on head-to-head victory.)	Detroit Lions	North	9	7	0	.563	5–1	8–4	.496	.368	W1
8	Seattle Seahawks	West	9	7	0	.563	4–2	7–5	.492	.444	L1
9	Dallas Cowboys	East	9	7	0	.563	5–1	7–5	.496	.438	W1
10	Arizona Cardinals	West	8	8	0	.500	3–3	5–7	.488	.406	W2
11 (Note: Green Bay finished ahead of Washington based on record vs. common opponents. Green Bay's cumulative record against Dallas, Minnesota, New Orleans and Seattle was 2–3, compared to Washington's 1–4 cumulative record against the same four teams.)	Green Bay Packers	North	7	9	0	.438	2–4	5–7	.539	.357	L3
12	Washington Redskins	East	7	9	0	.438	1–5	5–7	.539	.429	L1
13	San Francisco 49ers	West	6	10	0	.375	1–5	3–9	.512	.438	W5
14 (Note: Tampa Bay finished ahead of Chicago based on head-to-head victory.)	Tampa Bay Buccaneers	South	5	11	0	.313	1–5	3–9	.555	.375	W1
15	Chicago Bears	North	5	11	0	.313	0–6	1–11	.559	.500	L1
16	New York Giants	East	3	13	0	.188	1–5	1–11	.531	.458	W1
**Tiebreakers** (Note: When breaking ties for three or more teams under the NFL's rules, they are first broken within divisions, then comparing only the highest-ranked remaining team from each division.)

== Postseason ==
=== Schedule ===
Round	Date	Opponent (seed)	Result	Record	Venue	Recap
Wild Card	January 7, 2018	at New Orleans Saints (4)	L 26–31	0–1	Mercedes-Benz Superdome	Recap

=== Game summaries ===
==== NFC Wild Card Playoffs: at (4) New Orleans Saints ====
NFC Wild Card Playoffs: (5) Carolina Panthers at (4) New Orleans Saints – Game summary

Quarter	1	2	3	4	Total
Panthers	0	9	3	14	26
Saints	7	14	3	7	31

at Mercedes-Benz Superdome, New Orleans, Louisiana

- Date: January 7
- Game time: 4:40 p.m. EST/3:40 p.m. CST
- Game weather: Played indoors (dome stadium)
- Game attendance: 73,186
- Referee: Tony Corrente
- TV announcers (Fox): Joe Buck, Troy Aikman and Erin Andrews
- Recap, Gamebook

Game information

1st quarter

- NO – Ted Ginn Jr. 80-yard pass from Drew Brees (Wil Lutz kick), 1:46. Saints 7–0. Drive: 2 plays, 80 yards, 0:18.

2nd quarter

- CAR – Graham Gano 27-yard field goal, 14:12. Saints 7–3. Drive: 6 plays, 66 yards, 2:34.
- NO – Josh Hill 9-yard pass from Drew Brees (Wil Lutz kick), 9:04. Saints 14–3. Drive: 9 plays, 75 yards, 5:08.
- CAR – Graham Gano 39-yard field goal, 2:47. Saints 14–6. Drive: 12 plays, 54 yards, 6:17.
- NO – Zach Line 1-yard run (Wil Lutz kick), 0:43. Saints 21–6. Drive: 8 plays, 75 yards, 2:04.
- CAR – Graham Gano 58-yard field goal, 0:00. Saints 21–9. Drive: 5 plays, 35 yards, 0:43.

3rd quarter

- CAR – Graham Gano 29-yard field goal, 10:58. Saints 21–12. Drive: 9 plays, 64 yards, 4:02.
- NO – Wil Lutz 57-yard field goal, 6:05. Saints 24–12. Drive: 10 plays, 36 yards, 4:53.

4th quarter

- CAR – Greg Olsen 14-yard pass from Cam Newton (Graham Gano kick), 12:47. Saints 24–19. Drive: 8 plays, 68 yards, 3:45.
- NO – Alvin Kamara 2-yard run (Wil Lutz kick), 5:08. Saints 31–19. Drive: 5 plays, 62 yards, 3:02.
- CAR – Christian McCaffrey 56-yard pass from Cam Newton (Graham Gano kick), 4:09. Saints 31–26. Drive: 3 plays, 75 yards, 0:59.

Top passers

- CAR – Cam Newton – 24/40, 349 yards, 2 TD
- NO – Drew Brees – 23/33, 376 yards, 2 TD, INT

Top rushers

- CAR – Jonathan Stewart – 11 rushes, 51 yards
- NO – Alvin Kamara – 10 rushes, 23 yards, TD

Top receivers

- CAR – Greg Olsen – 8 receptions, 107 yards, TD
- NO – Michael Thomas – 8 receptions, 131 yards

Carolina looked to beat New Orleans for the first time all season. Carolina's defense played better than in the past games, holding the Saints dynamic running backs to under 100 yards combined. Saints quarterback Drew Brees threw a crucial interception late, but the Panthers comeback fell just short and they lost 26–31. The Panthers ended the Wild Card Weekend with an 11–6 record. This would be their last playoff game until 2025.
