= Scappoose High School =

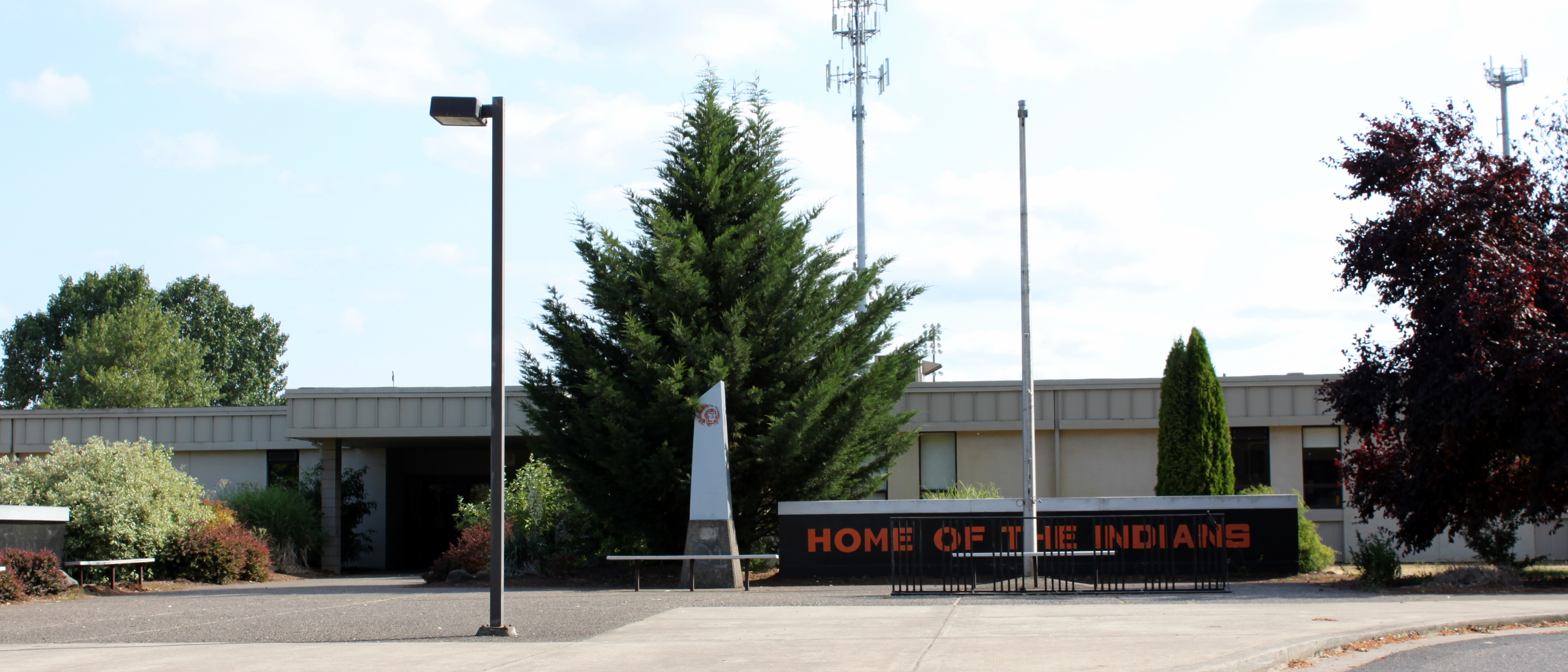

Location
- 33700 Southeast High School Way; Scappoose, Columbia County, Oregon 97056; United States; 45.748437°N 122.875096°W

Information
- Type: Public
- School district: Scappoose School District
- Principal: Jerimy Kelley
- Teaching staff: 36.30 (FTE)
- Grades: 9–12
- Enrollment: 656 (2022-2023)
- Student to teacher ratio: 18.07
- Campus: Rural
- Colors: Beaver Orange and Black
- Athletics conference: OSAA 4A-1 Cowapa League
- Mascot: Indian
- Team name: Indians
- Rivals: St. Helens High School
- Newspaper: The candle
- Website: Scappoose HS website

Scappoose High School is a public high school in Scappoose, Oregon, United States. It is the only high school in the Scappoose School District.

The district boundary includes Scappoose and Warren.

== Academics ==
In 2008, 95% of the school's seniors received their high school diploma. Of 168 students, 160 graduated, 5 dropped out, 1 received a modified diploma, and 2 remained in high school.

Scappoose High School offers four Advanced Placement (AP) classes and eight opportunities for college credit through Oregon Institute of Technology, Western Oregon University, and Portland Community College.

== Athletics ==
Scappoose High School athletic teams compete in the OSAA 4A-1 Cowapa League. The athletic director is Dale French and the athletics secretary is Brenda Lohman

State championships:

- Baseball: 1968, 1982, 2010, 2015, 2023
- Boys Basketball: 1957, 1972, 1973, 2015
- Girls Golf: 2017
- Boys Cross Country: 1981
- Choir: 1994
- Football: 2000, 2001, 2002
- Girls Soccer: 2013, 2015
- Girls Cross Country: 2011
- Softball: 1995
- Wrestling: 1974, 2010

== Controversy ==
In 2012, The Oregon Department of Education issued a ban on all Native American mascots. However, in 2016 they approved a resolution allowing to keep such mascots by 2017 with a federally recognized tribe. The Scappoose School District came to an agreement with The Confederated Tribes of Grand Ronde allowing them to keep the mascot. A petition was opened in 2020 calling on the Scappoose School District to change the mascot. This petition got over 5,500 signatures. However, many showed support for the "Indian" mascot and didn't want to see a change because the mascot is a symbol of "Pride and strength."

== Notable alumni ==
- Derek Anderson, American football player
- CC Barber, Miss Oregon 2009
- David Mayo, American football player
- Sara Jean Underwood, 2007 Playboy Playmate of the Year
- April Dobson, Oregon District Representative
