= Scappoose School District =

School district in Oregon, USA

- 33589 SE High School Way Scappoose, Oregon, 97056

District information
- Type: Public
- Grades: PK–12
- Established: 1862
- Superintendent: Tim Porter
- Schools: 9
- Budget: $32.6 million

Students and staff
- Students: 2,223
- Faculty: 292.11

Scappoose School District (SSD 1J) is a public school district in Scappoose, Oregon, United States. It covers the cities of Scappoose, Warren, and Sauvie Island, and is mostly in Columbia County, but a small portion is in Multnomah County, which has a small piece of the city limits of Portland.

== Demographics ==
The average student-teacher ratio across all schools is 18 to 1. During state testing, 53% of students scored below average in reading and writing and 79% scored below average in math.

Students at Scappoose High School on average score a 1170 on the SAT and a 24 on the ACT and the graduation rate is 87%, which is slightly above the average graduation rate of 81.3%. The University that most graduates attended was Oregon State University, followed by Portland State University.

== Schools ==
The district has a total of nine schools. This includes three elementary schools, one middle school, one high school, an early learning center, twocharter schools, and an online school.

There are two lower elementary schools. Grant Watts Elementary is located in Scappoose and Warren Elementary is located in Warren. They have a combined student enrollment of 504. The two elementary schools serve grades K-3.

An upper elementary school, Otto Petersen Elementary serves grades 4-6 and enrolls students from both Grant Watts and Warren. It has a student-teacher ratio of 20:1 and a student enrollment of 412. A long-range facility plan proposes that Otto Petersen is closed and the K-3 elementary schools are expanded to hold K-5. This may or may not be enacted in the future.

Scappoose Middle School serves grades 7 and 8, with a student enrollment of 313 and a student-teacher ratio of 18:1. In the facility plan that proposes the closure of Otto Petersen Elementary, it is proposed that SMS could be expanded to hold grade 6 as well.

Scappoose High School is the district's only high school and serves grades 9-12 with a student enrollment of 656 and a student-teacher ratio of 18:1. The school's athletics participate in the OSAA 4A-1 Cowapa League.

Students in the district have the choice to enroll at three alternative schools:

Sauvie Island School is located on Sauvie Island and serves grades K-8. The school is independent from the district but is sponsored by it as most graduates go on to attend Scappoose High School. It has a student enrollment of 211 and a student-teacher ratio of 16:1.

South Columbia Family School is located in Warren on the campus of Warren Elementary. It serves grades K-8, with a student enrollment of 58 and a student-teacher ratio of 19:1. Students at the school attend school one day per week to meet with their teachers, and do the rest of their schoolwork at home. This is commonly an option for parents in the district who wish to homeschool. The school is independent from the district but is sponsored by it as most graduates go on to attend Scappoose High School.
