= David Mayo =

American football player (born 1993)

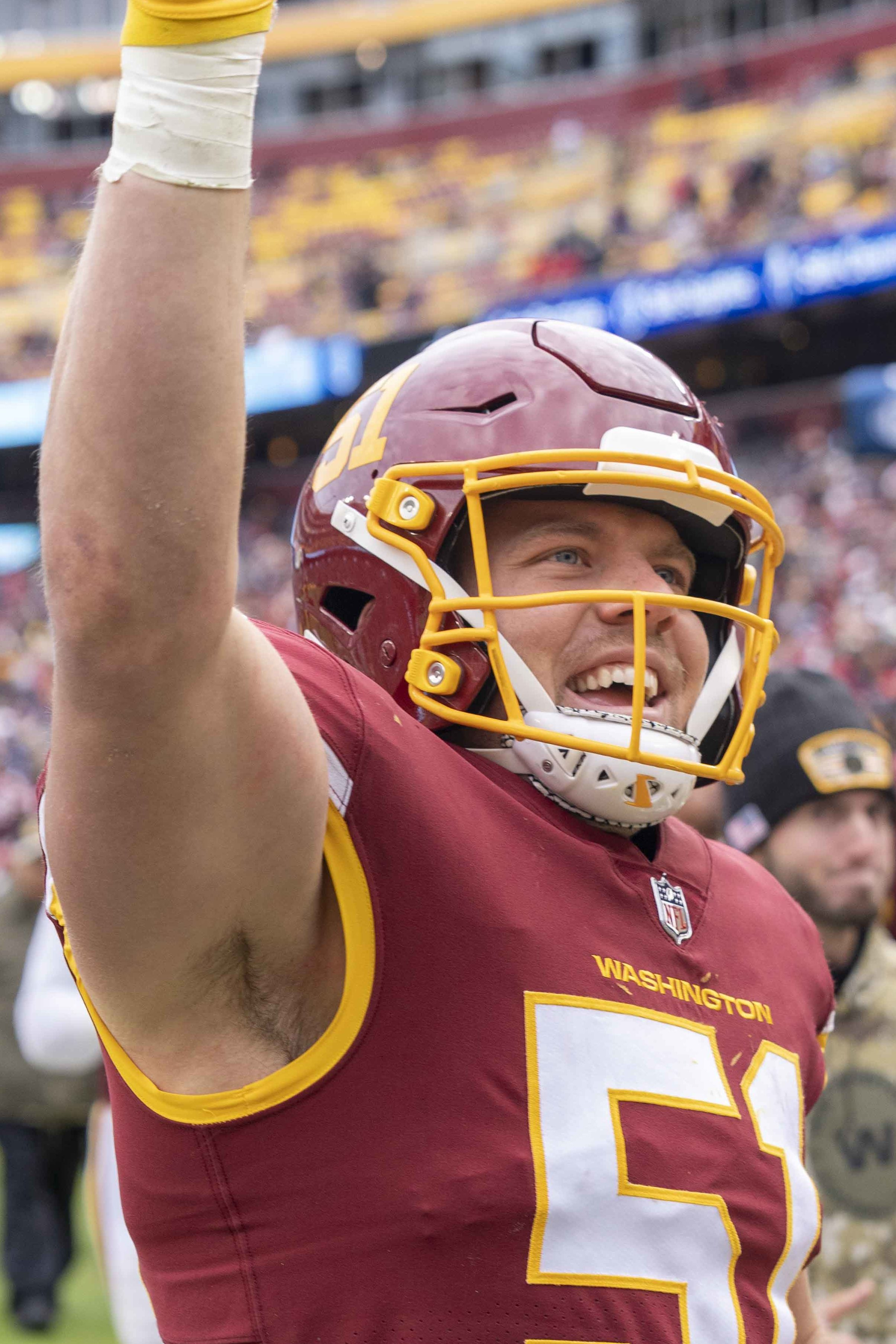
- Mayo with the Washington Football Team in 2021

No. 55, 51
- Position: Linebacker

Personal information
- Born: August 18, 1993 (age 33); St. Helens, Oregon, U.S.
- Listed height: 6 ft 2 in (1.88 m)
- Listed weight: 240 lb (109 kg)

Career information
- High school: Scappoose (Scappoose, Oregon)
- College: Santa Monica (2011); Texas State (2012–2014)
- NFL draft: 2015: 5th round, 169th overall pick

Career history
- Carolina Panthers (2015–2018); San Francisco 49ers (2019)*; New York Giants (2019–2020); Washington Football Team / Commanders (2021–2023)
- * Offseason or practice squad member only

Awards and highlights
- Sun Belt Defensive Player of the Year (2014); First-team All-Sun Belt (2014)

Career NFL statistics
- Total tackles: 295
- Sacks: 5.0
- Forced fumbles: 1
- Fumble recoveries: 2
- Pass deflections: 5
- Stats at Pro Football Reference

David Mayo (born August 18, 1993) is an American former professional football player who was a linebacker in the National Football League (NFL). He played college football for the Texas State Bobcats and was selected by the Carolina Panthers in the fifth round of the 2015 NFL draft. Mayo was also a member of the San Francisco 49ers, New York Giants, and Washington Commanders.

== Early life ==
Mayo was born in St. Helens, Oregon to Wayne Mayo and Lori Haggans. His family later moved to Scappoose, Oregon, where he played football, track and basketball for Scappoose High School. He played football for junior college, Santa Monica College, in California before transferring to play football for Texas State University.

== Professional career ==
Pre-draft measurables
Height	Weight	Arm length	Hand span	40-yard dash	10-yard split	20-yard split	20-yard shuttle	Three-cone drill	Vertical jump	Broad jump	Bench press
6 ft 1 in (1.85 m)	235 lb (107 kg)	30 1/2 in (0.77 m)	9 1/2 in (0.24 m)	4.74 s	1.64 s	2.68 s	4.31 s	7.15 s	34 1/2 in (0.88 m)	9 ft 5 in (2.87 m)	24 reps
All values from Texas State’s Pro Day

=== Carolina Panthers ===
The Carolina Panthers selected Mayo in the fifth round (169th overall) of the 2015 NFL draft. He signed his four-year rookie contract, worth $2.44 million contract, on May 7, 2015. Mayo was part of the Panthers team that played in the Super Bowl 50 loss to the Denver Broncos.

=== San Francisco 49ers ===
On March 14, 2019, Mayo signed a two-year contract with the San Francisco 49ers. He was released on August 31, 2019.

=== New York Giants ===
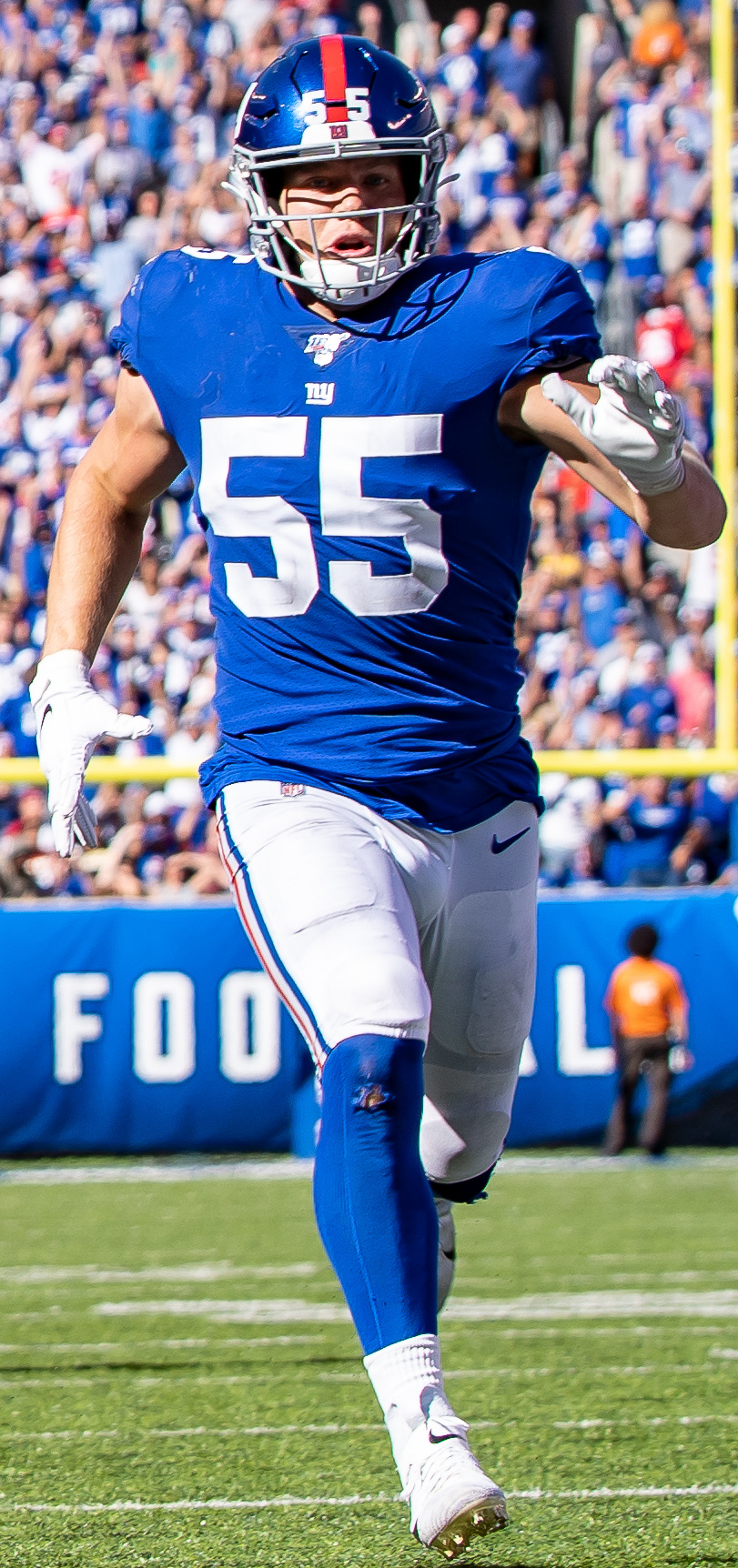
Mayo playing for the New York Giants in 2019

On September 2, 2019, Mayo was signed by the New York Giants. In Week 5 against the New England Patriots, Mayo recorded a team high 13 tackles and a sack. On March 16, 2020, Mayo signed a three-year contract extension with the team. On September 6, 2020, he was placed on injured reserve with a torn meniscus before being activated on October 16, 2020. Mayo was released on March 4, 2021.

=== Washington Football Team / Commanders ===
Mayo signed with the Washington Football Team on March 18, 2021. He was released on August 31, 2021, but re-signed with the team the following day. On December 13, 2021, he was placed on the COVID-19 reserve list. After missing the Week 15 game against the Philadelphia Eagles, he was placed back on the active roster on December 23.

On January 28, 2022, Mayo signed a one-year contract extension with Washington. He re-signed on another one-year contract on February 24, 2023.

=== Retirement ===
Mayo announced his retirement on Instagram on March 6, 2025.

== NFL statistics ==
Year	Team	Games		Tackles				Interceptions						Fumbles	
Year	Team	GP	GS	Comb	Solo	Ast	Sck	PDef	Int	Yds	Avg	Lng	TDs	FF	FR
2015	CAR	12	0	10	7	3	0	0	0	0	0	0	0	0	0
2016	CAR	15	0	19	16	3	0	0	0	0	0	0	0	0	0
2017	CAR	16	1	19	8	11	0	1	0	0	0	0	0	0	0
2018	CAR	16	3	14	8	6	0	1	0	0	0	0	0	0	0
2019	NYG	16	13	82	52	30	2	2	0	0	0	0	0	0	1
2020	NYG	11	2	29	18	11	0	0	0	0	0	0	0	1	0
2021	WAS	16	4	28	20	8	0	0	0	0	0	0	0	0	1
2022	WAS	4	0	3	1	2	0	0	0	0	0	0	0	0	0
Total		106	23	204	130	74	2	3	0	0	0	0	0	1	2
