= Brenton Bersin =

American football player (born 1990)

No. 11
- Position: Wide receiver

Personal information
- Born: May 9, 1990 (age 36); Charlotte, North Carolina, U.S.
- Listed height: 6 ft 3 in (1.91 m)
- Listed weight: 211 lb (96 kg)

Career information
- High school: Charlotte Latin School
- College: Wofford (2008–2011)
- NFL draft: 2012: undrafted

Career history
- Carolina Panthers (2012)*; Arizona Rattlers (2013); Carolina Panthers (2013–2017)
- * Offseason or practice squad member only

Career NFL statistics
- Receptions: 32
- Receiving yards: 415
- Receiving touchdowns: 1
- Stats at Pro Football Reference
- Stats at ArenaFan.com

Brenton Bersin (born May 9, 1990) is an American former professional football player who was a wide receiver in the National Football League (NFL). He played college football for the Wofford Terriers and was signed by the Carolina Panthers as an undrafted free agent in 2012.

== Early life ==
Bersin attended Charlotte Latin School in Charlotte, North Carolina. He graduated in 2008.

== College career ==
Bersin played college football at Wofford College from 2008 to 2011. He started 33 of 46 games in his career, recording 77 receptions for 1,567 yards and 15 touchdowns. His junior year was his most successful year at Wofford, catching a team high 32 passes for 705 yards, with the yardage mark good enough for third in school history. He had nine touchdown catches, which tied Jerry Richardson for the school's single-season record. His senior year marked his only individual award collected at Wofford, when he won the Week 6 Special Teams Player of the Week for the Southern Conference after returning a punt 76 yards for a touchdown against The Citadel Bulldogs.

== Professional career ==
Bersin was signed by the Carolina Panthers after going undrafted in the 2012 NFL draft. Bersin was released by the Panthers during the first round of cuts in 2012. In 2013, Bersin signed with the Arizona Rattlers of the Arena Football League, playing in three games before re-signing with the Panthers in the spring. Once again, Bersin was released during training camp, this time during the final round of cuts. He spent all of the 2013 season on the Panthers practice squad before finally making the 53-man roster in 2014 after the team had lost all active receivers from the previous year. His first NFL catch came against the Detroit Lions on September 14, 2014 when he caught a third down pass from Cam Newton for eight yards and a first down. His first touchdown came on October 20, against the Green Bay Packers on a one-yard pass from Derek Anderson.

Bersin was released by the Panthers during final roster cuts on September 5, 2015, and was then signed to the teams' practice squad. He was once again signed to the active roster as a free agent from the practice squad on September 25. Bersin had a career-high 54 yards receiving in a week four matchup against the Tampa Bay Buccaneers, as well as a career long 30-yard reception.

On February 7, 2016, Bersin's Panthers played in Super Bowl 50. He was inactive for the game, which saw the Panthers fall to the Denver Broncos by a score of 24–10.

Bersin was released by the Panthers on October 1, 2016, and re-signed two days later. Bersin caught two passes in the 2016 season.

On March 7, 2017, Bersin signed a one-year contract extension with the Panthers. He was placed on injured reserve on September 2. Bersin was released by Carolina on September 11. He was re-signed by the Panthers on November 1.

== Personal life ==
Brenton Bersin is married to Olivia Jewell
