= Warren, Oregon =

Unincorporated community in the state of Oregon, United States

- Census-designated place
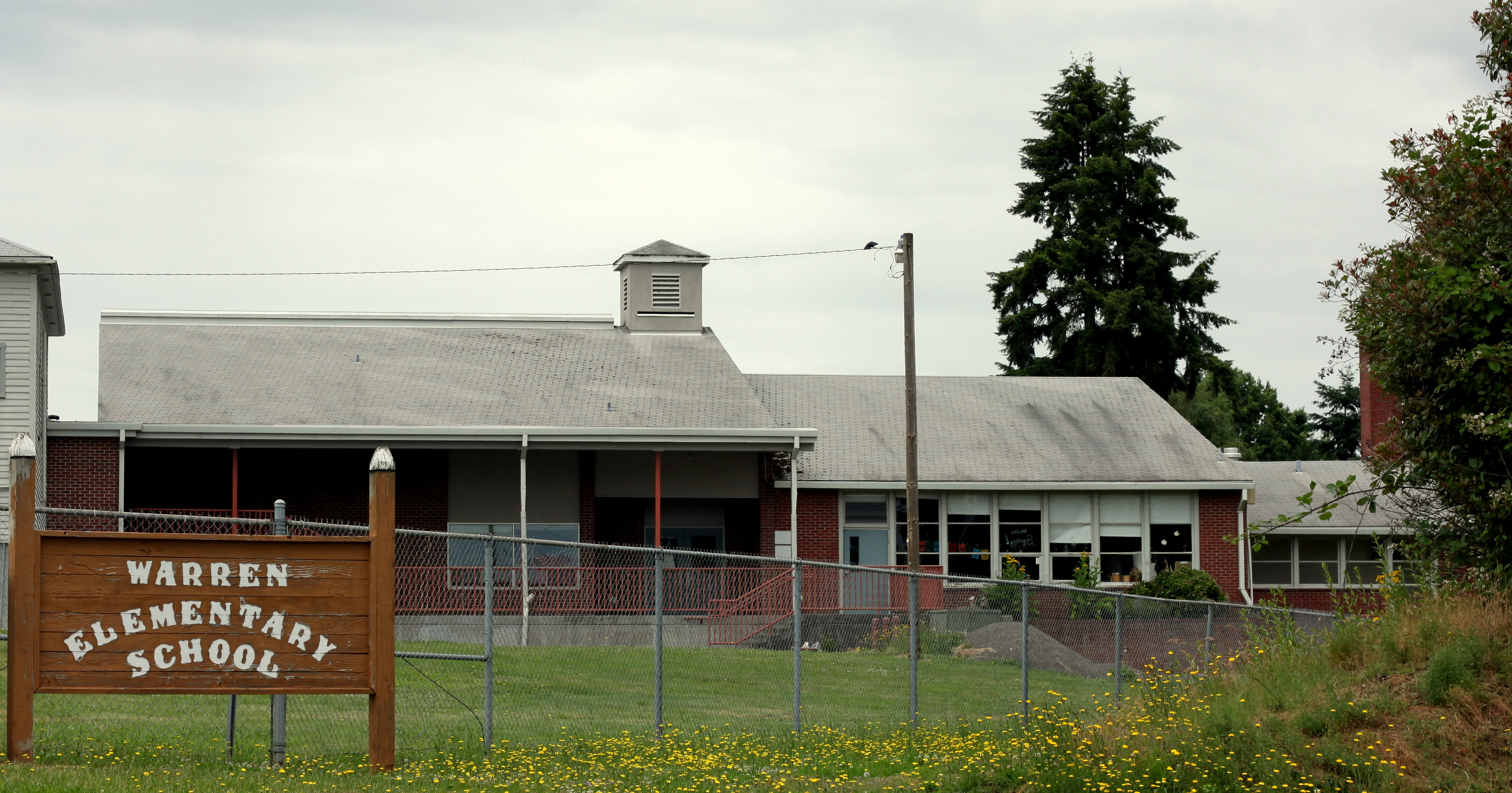
- Warren Elementary School

- Location within the state of Oregon Warren (the United States)
- Coordinates: 45°48′45″N 122°52′00″W
- Country: United States
- State: Oregon
- County: Columbia

Area
  - Total: 6.33 sq mi (16.40 km^{2})
  - Land: 6.31 sq mi (16.35 km^{2})
  - Water: 0.019 sq mi (0.05 km^{2})
- Elevation: 171 ft (52 m)

Population (2020)
  - Total: 1,870
  - Density: 296/sq mi (114.4/km^{2})
- Time zone: UTC-8 (Pacific (PST))
  - Summer (DST): UTC-7 (PDT)
- ZIP code: 97053
- FIPS code: 41-78800
- GNIS feature ID: 2611783

Warren is an unincorporated community and census-designated place in Columbia County, Oregon, United States, located on U.S. Route 30 north of Scappoose and south of St. Helens on Scappoose Bay of the Multnomah Channel of the Willamette River. As of the 2020 census, Warren had a population of 1,870.

== History ==
The Warren post office was established in 1885; it was named by local resident James Gill for his hometown of Warren, Massachusetts. The post office was discontinued in 1888, but reestablished in 1890 as "Gilltown" because there was another post office named Warren in Umatilla County. The Columbia County office became Warren again in 1895, and the Umatilla County office was closed in 1902; the locality in Umatilla County is now known as Myrick. The school was established in 1903, and expanded in 1940, 1950, 1970, and 1990. Warren Elementary was then remodeled starting in May 2009 to move the office and add a kindergarten classroom. The community became a census designated place in 2021 after the 2020 US Census.

== Demographics ==
Historical population
Census	Pop.	Note	%±
2020	1,870		—
U.S. Decennial Census

As of the 2020 census, there were 1,870 people, 782 families, and 741 housing units. In the city, there were 1,683 White people, 11 African Americans, 22 Native Americans, 12 Asians, 3 Pacific Islanders, 10 people who said they were from another race, and 129 who were from two or more races. 86 people were of Hispanic or Latino origin.

The ancestry of Warren, Oregon was 25.5% German, 10.7% English,8.5% Irish, 8.2% Norwegian, 7.5% Scottish, 2.7% Italian, 2.3% Polish, and 1.8% French.

The median age in Warren was 59.9 years old. With 37.6% of the population being over 65, 22.4% were from 65 to 74, 14.3% 75 to 84, and 0.9% were older than 85. 1.4% of the population were foreign born.

The median household income was $88,409. For families it was $104,196, for married-couple families it was the same, and for non-families it was $42,205. 1.8% of the population were in poverty. 5.3% of people under 18 were in poverty, 2.1% of people 18 to 64 years old were in poverty, and 0.0% of people over 65 were in poverty.

== Climate ==
This region experiences warm (but not hot) and dry summers, with no average monthly temperatures above 71.6 °F (22.0 °C). According to the Köppen Climate Classification system, Warren has a warm-summer Mediterranean climate, abbreviated "Csb" on climate maps.

== Government ==
As the community is unincorporated, there is no municipal government. Warren is in the Scappoose School District, which operates Scappoose High School. Water is provided by the member owned Warren Water Association, while fire protection service is through the Scappoose Rural Fire Protection District.
