= Derek Anderson (American football) =

American football player (born 1983)

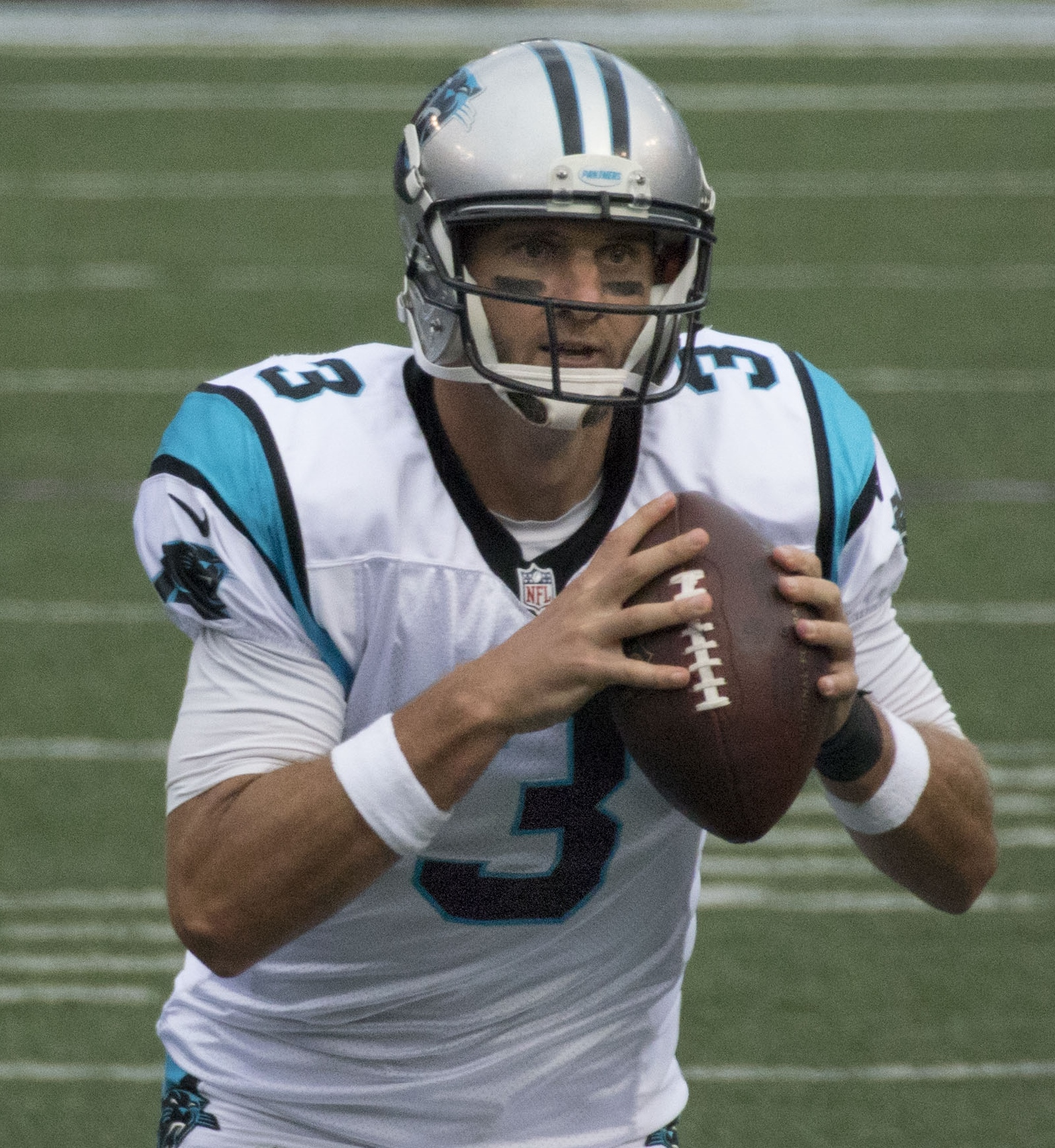
- Anderson with the Carolina Panthers in 2014

No. 14, 3
- Position: Quarterback

Personal information
- Born: June 15, 1983 (age 43); Scappoose, Oregon, U.S.
- Listed height: 6 ft 6 in (1.98 m)
- Listed weight: 235 lb (107 kg)

Career information
- High school: Scappoose
- College: Oregon State (2001–2004)
- NFL draft: 2005: 6th round, 213th overall pick

Career history
- Baltimore Ravens (2005); Cleveland Browns (2005–2009); Arizona Cardinals (2010); Carolina Panthers (2011–2017); Buffalo Bills (2018)

Awards and highlights
- Pro Bowl (2007); Second-team All-Pac-10 (2004)

Career NFL statistics
- Passing attempts: 1,674
- Passing completions: 909
- Completion percentage: 54.3%
- TD–INT: 60–64
- Passing yards: 10,878
- Passer rating: 70.4
- Rushing yards: 226
- Rushing touchdowns: 5
- Stats at Pro Football Reference

Derek Matthew Anderson (born June 15, 1983) is an American former professional football player who was a quarterback for 14 seasons in the National Football League (NFL). He played college football for the Oregon State Beavers. Anderson was selected by the Baltimore Ravens in the sixth round of the 2005 NFL draft. A 2007 Pro Bowler, he also played for the Cleveland Browns, Arizona Cardinals, Carolina Panthers, and Buffalo Bills.

== Early life ==
Anderson grew up in Scappoose, Oregon, where he led the Scappoose Indians football team to one of their record three consecutive state football championships in Class 3A football. He excelled at basketball and was named state player of the year in both football and basketball his senior year. He participated in the first ever U.S. Army All-American Bowl game in 2000. He was a childhood friend and schoolmate of Playboy Playmate Sara Jean Underwood.

== College career ==
A Beaver fan growing up, Anderson wanted to play for Oregon State most of his life, and his decision as a top national prospect to play for the Beavers was celebrated by fans.

At 6-feet-6-inches, many believed Anderson would play basketball in college. Despite his stature, Anderson was highly recruited nationally for football, especially after his dominating senior year performance in high school as quarterback.

=== Freshman season (2001) ===
As a freshman in the 2001 season, Anderson appeared in five games and recorded 263 passing yards, one touchdown, and three interceptions.

=== Sophomore season (2002) ===
Anderson's early entry as the starting quarterback came on the heels of Oregon State's most successful period to date. Capped by a crushing 41–9 Fiesta Bowl win over Notre Dame, the team went 11–1 in 2000 and ranked 4th in the nation under head coach Dennis Erickson. Following the breakthrough season, fan expectations were exceptionally high in 2002 for the Oregon State program to pick up where they left off.

Unfortunately, Oregon State had lost the majority of its star players to the NFL in 2001 and the inexperienced Anderson was handed the reins of a team many overestimated and believed would again crack the top 25. However, the team's youth was easily apparent from the start and led to a string of early losses. Still, Anderson and the team's performance rapidly improved and the Beavers recorded an 8–5 season. He and the team's work were good enough to give them entry into the 2002 Insight Bowl, against the University of Pittsburgh. Oregon State lost 38–13 and coach Erickson left for an NFL head-coaching position with the San Francisco 49ers.

=== Junior season (2003) ===
Pressures on the team to repeat the program's 2000 performance were compounded by the coaching change at the end of 2002–2003. The return of previous head coach Mike Riley from the NFL meant learning an entirely new system. With help from teammate and star running back Steven Jackson, Anderson again rose to the occasion and played a leading role in propelling the team to an 8–5 record, capped by a 55–14 Las Vegas Bowl win over a then up-and-coming New Mexico program.

=== Senior season (2004) ===
Throughout the 2004 season, Anderson surprised many defenses with his ability to escape the tackle and run the ball effectively. He became a dual-threat quarterback and began showing a true command of the game by his improvisation in the pocket and successful outlet passing when under duress. Although the team's 7–5 performance was far from spectacular, Anderson became nationally recognized as a dangerous offensive weapon who could strike long gains at will. The Beavers were without Steven Jackson, who was drafted into the NFL the previous spring. Even without the star running back, Anderson led his team back to the Insight Bowl where they again faced Notre Dame (led by Anderson's future Browns teammate Brady Quinn). The Beavers never trailed in the game and defeated the Irish 38–21. Anderson passed for 359 yards and had four touchdown passes with no interceptions.

Anderson is the fourth player in Pac-10 history to throw for over 4,000 yards in a single season, setting an Oregon State record at 4,058 yards in the 2003 season. He ranks second in the Pac-10 for career touchdown passes, at 79 (also an Oregon State record). He is the 6th person ever to throw for 10,000 yards in a career in the Pac-10.

== Professional career ==
Pre-draft measurables
Height	Weight	Arm length	Hand span	40-yard dash	10-yard split	20-yard split	20-yard shuttle	Three-cone drill	Vertical jump	Broad jump	Wonderlic
6 ft 6 1/8 in (1.98 m)	242 lb (110 kg)	33 in (0.84 m)	9 7/8 in (0.25 m)	5.06 s	1.77 s	2.95 s	4.62 s	7.67 s	29.0 in (0.74 m)	9 ft 7 in (2.92 m)	23
All values from NFL Combine

=== Baltimore Ravens ===
Anderson was selected out of Oregon State University by the Baltimore Ravens in the sixth round of the 2005 NFL draft (213th overall). He never played for them and was waived on September 20, 2005.

=== Cleveland Browns ===
==== 2005 season ====
Anderson was claimed off waivers by the Cleveland Browns the day after being waived by the Ravens. He did not see any action, being third on the depth chart behind Trent Dilfer and Charlie Frye.

==== 2006 season ====
Anderson served as Frye's backup for the Cleveland Browns in 2006 season. He made his NFL debut against the Denver Broncos at Cleveland Browns Stadium, on October 22, taking one snap after Frye was briefly shaken up. His second NFL appearance was more noteworthy. After Frye injured his wrist during the first half of Cleveland's December 3 game against the Kansas City Chiefs, Anderson played the entire second half. He threw his first two NFL touchdowns in that game, connecting with tight end Steve Heiden twice in the fourth quarter. Anderson scrambled for 33 yards in overtime, moving the ball from the Kansas City 45-yard line to the 12-yard line, after which the Browns were in field goal range. His play was instrumental in leading the Browns back from a 28–14 deficit to a 31–28 overtime victory. Overall, Anderson appeared in five games and recorded 793 passing yards, five touchdowns, and eight interceptions in the 2006 season.

==== 2007 season ====
Although some reports said he outplayed incumbent starter Frye and rookie Brady Quinn in minicamp, Anderson was not as productive in the pre-season games and Frye was named the starter for the 2007 season. Head coach Romeo Crennel earlier said that the two were so close in effectiveness that he would use a coin toss to decide which quarterback would start the first preseason game. Anderson would take over for Frye in the 2007 opener after Frye was ineffective in the first quarter against the Browns' archrival, the Pittsburgh Steelers. The game was Frye's last in a Browns uniform, as he was traded to the Seattle Seahawks for a sixth-round draft pick two days later. Named the starting quarterback by Crennel for Week 2, Anderson threw for 328 yards and five touchdowns against the Cincinnati Bengals in his first start. His passer rating for the game was 121.0 as the Browns defeated the Bengals 51–45, solidifying Anderson's role. In the same game, Bengals quarterback Carson Palmer threw for six touchdown passes. It was only the third time in NFL history that two quarterbacks had thrown at least five touchdown passes in the same game.

On September 30, Anderson beat the team that drafted him, the Baltimore Ravens. He threw for two touchdowns and 204 yards, completing 10 of 18 pass attempts with just one interception. The Browns would later beat the Ravens again, making it the first time since 2001 that the Browns were able to sweep the Ravens.

In Week 13 of the 2007 season, the Browns faced the Arizona Cardinals. Down 27–21 late in the 4th, the Browns drove down to the Cardinals 34-yard line. On fourth down, Anderson threw a pass to the end zone which was caught by Kellen Winslow II. The pass was ruled out of bounds and held up through review. Anderson argued that Winslow was forced out, but the force-out rule was not reviewable. The game was notable for the officials' missed call of a Braylon Edwards catch and tackle by contact, but mistakenly ruled a touchdown as Edwards got up and ran to the endzone.

Another close game that could have put the Browns in the playoffs was December 23 against the Bengals, in which the Browns went scoreless in the first half, but held the Bengals scoreless in the second half. Anderson had four interceptions, two of them on consecutive plays, and one more in the Cincinnati end zone as Cleveland appeared to be heading for a scoring drive. The Browns also had two turnover-on-downs possessions. Anderson threw two touchdown passes to Braylon Edwards, Cleveland's only scores in the game. The game ended in a 19–14 loss.

Anderson led the Browns to a 10–6 overall record, 10–5 in games in which he started. Anderson finished with 29 touchdowns to 19 interceptions. During the week of December 12–18, Anderson was named as a first alternate for the 2008 Pro Bowl at quarterback. On February 4, Tom Brady announced he would not be attending the Pro Bowl due to injury. This paved the way for Anderson to make his first and only appearance in the Pro Bowl. The PFWA named Anderson as their Most Improved Player.

==== 2008 season ====
On February 29, 2008, the first day of free agency, after speculation that Anderson would leave Cleveland to pursue a bigger contract, Anderson agreed to a $27 million, three-year contract to stay with the Browns through the 2010 season. The contract made Anderson one of the highest paid players in the NFL, However, Cleveland fans were split between the proven Anderson and the locally-homegrown Quinn (an image of Quinn wearing a Bernie Kosar jersey as a kid was shown at the 2007 NFL draft), many were speculating if the Browns were in a similar position the San Diego Chargers were in a few years back with Drew Brees and their first-round pick Philip Rivers.

The 2008 season was a tough one for the Browns and Anderson. In the preseason, he suffered a concussion when he was sacked by Osi Umenyiora of the New York Giants. This would prevent him from practicing for the majority of the preseason. In the season opener against the Dallas Cowboys, he was 11-of-24 for 110 yards and a touchdown. On November 3, after starting out the season the Browns announced that Anderson would be benched in favor of Quinn. On November 23, during a game against the Houston Texans, Quinn was benched by Crennel in favor of Anderson. On November 25, Quinn was ruled out for the remainder of the season with a broken finger and Anderson was renamed the starting quarterback. On November 30, Anderson was injured during a game versus the Indianapolis Colts. It was later revealed to be an MCL injury, which put Anderson out for the season. Ken Dorsey came into the starting role, but could not save the Browns. The Browns lost the last four games to finish with a 4–12 record.

==== 2009 season ====
In the 2009 season, Anderson continued to compete with Quinn. He appeared in eight games for the Browns. He finished with 888 passing yards, three touchdowns, and ten interceptions. The Browns finished the season with a 5–11 record. Anderson would wind up being one of the most productive quarterbacks for Cleveland, statistically, and that legacy lasted over the franchise's next nine years as he ranked the third-best quarterback overall between 2000 and 2018.

=== Arizona Cardinals ===
Anderson with the Cardinals in 2010

On March 17, 2010, Anderson signed a two-year deal worth $7.25 million with the Arizona Cardinals. After Kurt Warner retired and Matt Leinart was released, Anderson became the starting quarterback for the Cardinals. After struggling in his first few games, Anderson was benched in favor of rookie Max Hall on October 6. Anderson was named the starting quarterback again for the November 7 game against the Minnesota Vikings after Hall struggled. However, in week 14 he suffered a concussion in the Cardinals 43–13 win over the Broncos. Anderson was replaced with Hall in that game, whose season ended with a separated shoulder later in the game. Rookie John Skelton finished the game and succeeded Anderson as the Cardinals' starting quarterback. Skelton suffered in the same fashion, as the Cardinals went 1 and 2 in the last three games of the season. The last game was a 39–7 stomping by the San Francisco 49ers. Anderson also created a notable soundbite after being caught on national TV laughing with teammate Deuce Lutui while his team was playing poorly. His subsequent anger toward the reporter who kept questioning him on the subject made national news and was featured on several sports shows. Running back Tim Hightower defended Anderson after the incident, and Anderson apologized for the misstep. Anderson was released by the Cardinals on July 28, 2011.

=== Carolina Panthers ===
Anderson signed with the Carolina Panthers on July 31, 2011. He served as the backup to quarterback Cam Newton and played only a few times for Carolina either to end the game or play for an injured Newton.

On September 7, 2014, Anderson made his first start since 2010 after Newton suffered an injury which held him out. In the game, Anderson completed 24 of 34 passes for 230 yards, two touchdowns, and no interceptions, leading the Panthers to a 20–14 victory over the Tampa Bay Buccaneers. Anderson would have his second start of the season after Newton was involved in a car accident, coincidentally also against the Buccaneers. Anderson finished the game by completing 25 of 40 passes for 277 yards, a touchdown, and no interceptions, helping the Panthers win 19–17.

On February 7, 2016, Anderson was part of the Panthers team that played in Super Bowl 50. In the game, Anderson served as Cam Newton's active-backup as the Panthers fell to the Denver Broncos by a score of 24–10.

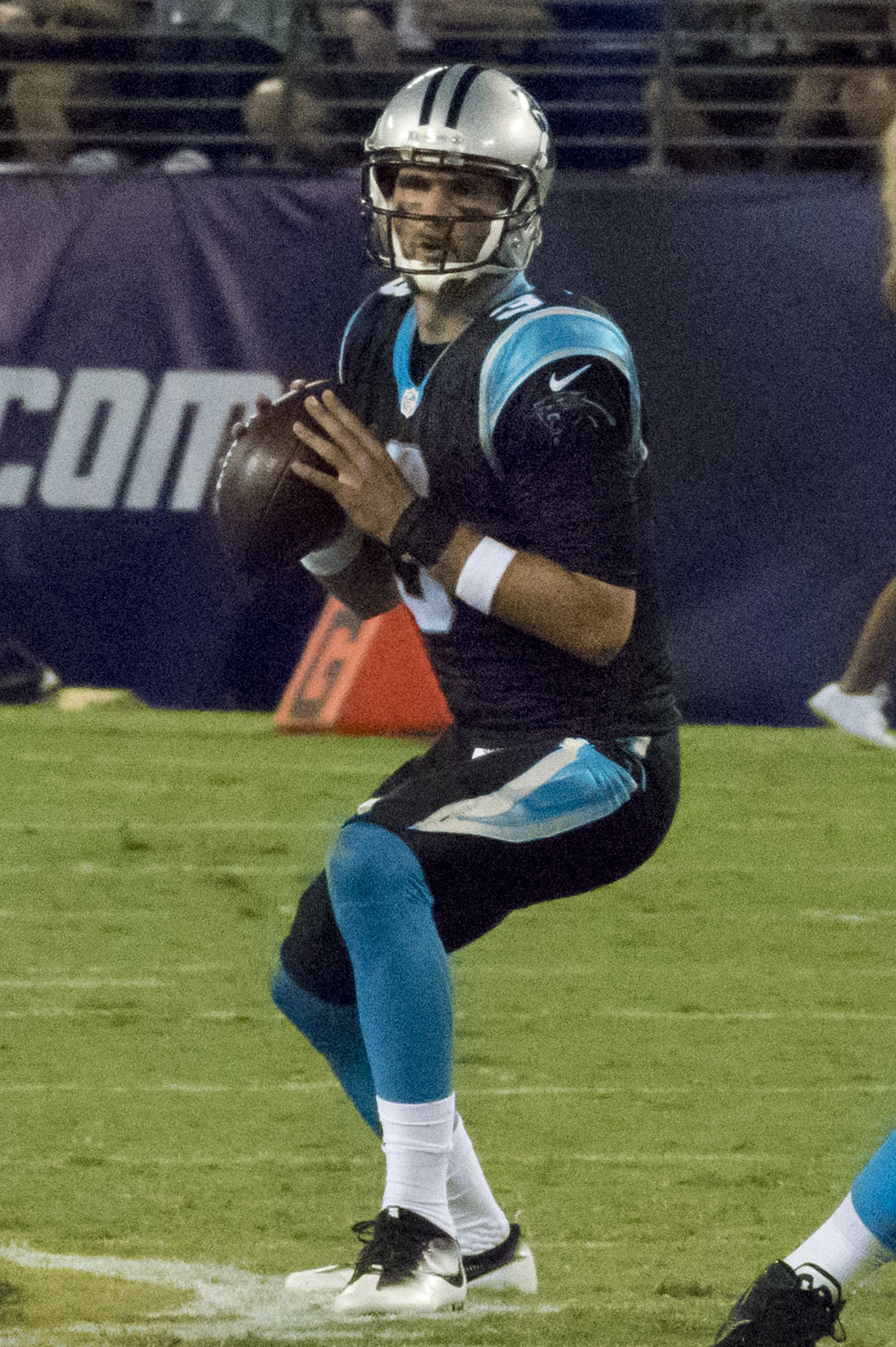
Anderson with the Panthers in 2016

In Week 4 of the 2016 season against the Atlanta Falcons, Anderson entered the game after an injury to Newton and threw for 172 yards, two touchdowns, and two interceptions as the Panthers lost by a score of 48–33. Due to Newton's injury, Anderson started the Week 5 game against the Buccaneers and threw for 278 yards and two interceptions as the Panthers lost by a score of 17–14. In Week 13 against the Seattle Seahawks, Anderson made his second start of the season since Newton had violated the team's dress code. He threw an interception on the Panthers' first play on offense and was then replaced by Newton. Anderson came into the 2017 NFC Wild Card Round on January 7, 2018, against the New Orleans Saints in the fourth quarter after Newton went down with an injury. He had one pass attempt in the 31–26 defeat.

=== Buffalo Bills ===
On October 7, 2018, it was announced Anderson would sign with the Buffalo Bills, reuniting with Sean McDermott and Brandon Beane from his days playing for the Carolina Panthers, to serve as backup and mentor to rookie quarterback Josh Allen. The Bills completed the transaction on October 9.

On October 17, following an injury to Allen and a poor performance by backup quarterback Nathan Peterman in relief, Anderson was named the Week 7 starter for the Bills against the Indianapolis Colts. During the game, Anderson threw for 175 yards, no touchdowns, and three interceptions in a 37–5 loss. With Allen still injured, Anderson made the start the following week against the New England Patriots. He threw for 290 yards, no touchdowns, and one interception before leaving the game in the fourth quarter. He was put into concussion protocol and ruled out for the Week 9 game against the Chicago Bears, and Peterman was named the starter once again.

On December 31, 2018, Anderson signed a one-year contract extension with the Bills.

=== Retirement ===
On May 9, 2019, Anderson announced his retirement from the NFL. He later attributed his retirement to lingering effects from the 2018 concussion; he remains in regular contact with Allen and approved of the hiring of his (Anderson's) friend Ken Dorsey as quarterbacks coach.

== Career statistics ==
Legend
**Bold**	Career high

=== NFL ===
==== Regular season ====
Year	Team	Games			Passing								Rushing				Sacked		Fumbles (Note: Fumbles lost data taken from Pro Football Reference career game log)	
Year	Team	GP	GS	Record	Cmp	Att	Pct	Yds	Y/A	TD	Int	Rtg	Att	Yds	Avg	TD	Sck	SckY	Fum	Lost
2005	BAL	0	0	DNP																
2005	CLE	0	0	DNP																
2006	CLE	5	3	0—3	66	117	56.4	793	6.8	5	8	63.1	4	47	**11.8**	0	8	66	2	1
2007	CLE	16	15	**10–5**	**298**	**527**	56.5	**3,787**	7.2	**29**	**19**	82.5	**32**	**70**	2.2	**3**	14	109	5	2
2008	CLE	10	9	3–6	142	283	50.2	1,615	5.7	9	8	66.5	25	55	2.2	0	14	87	9	2
2009	CLE	8	7	3–4	81	182	44.5	888	4.9	3	10	42.1	10	8	0.8	2	11	75	5	**3**
2010	ARI	12	9	2–7	169	327	51.7	2,065	6.3	7	10	65.9	5	25	5	0	**25**	**176**	**6**	**3**
2011	CAR	2	0	–	0	0	0.0	0	0.0	0	0	0.0	2	−2	−1.0	0	0	0	0	0
2012	CAR	2	0	–	4	4	**100.0**	58	**14.5**	0	0	**118.8**	0	0	0.0	0	0	0	0	0
2013	CAR	4	0	–	0	0	0.0	0	0.0	0	0	0.0	5	0	0.0	0	0	0	0	0
2014	CAR	6	2	2–0	65	97	67.0	701	7.2	5	0	105.2	8	24	3.0	0	4	17	2	0
2015	CAR	3	0	–	4	6	66.7	36	6.0	0	0	82.6	7	−2	−0.3	0	0	0	1	0
2016	CAR	5	2	0–2	36	53	67.9	453	8.5	2	5	67.6	1	4	4.0	0	0	0	1	1
2017	CAR	3	0	–	2	8	25.0	17	2.1	0	0	39.6	2	−2	−1.0	0	0	0	0	0
2018	BUF	2	2	0–2	42	70	60.0	465	6.6	0	4	56.0	1	−1	−1.0	0	5	33	3	2
Total		78	49	20–29	909	1,674	54.3	10,878	6.5	60	64	70.4	102	226	2.2	5	81	563	34	14

==== Postseason ====
Year	Team	Games			Passing								Rushing				Sacked		Fumbles	
Year	Team	GP	GS	Record	Cmp	Att	Pct	Yds	Y/A	TD	Int	Rtg	Att	Yds	Avg	TD	Sck	SckY	Fum	Lost
2013	CAR	0	0	DNP																
2014	CAR	0	0	DNP																
2015	CAR	1	0	–	0	0	0.0	0	0.0	0	0	0.0	**2**	**−2**	**-1.0**	0	0	0	0	0
2017	CAR	1	0	–	0	**1**	0.0	0	0.0	0	0	**39.6**	0	0	0.0	0	0	0	0	0
Total		2	0	–	0	1	0.0	0	0.0	0	0	39.6	2	-2	-1.0	0	0	0	0	0

=== College ===
Year	Team	Games	Passing								Rushing			
Year	Team	GP	Comp	Att	Pct	Yards	Avg	TD	Int	Rate	Att	Yards	Avg	TD
2001	Oregon State	11	17	41	41.5	263	6.4	1	3	88.8	5	−25	−5.0	0
2002	Oregon State	13	211	449	47.0	3,313	7.4	25	13	121.6	45	−231	−5.1	2
2003	Oregon State	13	261	510	51.2	**4,058**	**8.0**	24	**24**	124.1	57	**-125**	−2.2	**4**
2004	Oregon State	12	**279**	**515**	**54.1**	3,615	7.0	**29**	17	**125.1**	**75**	−152	**-2.0**	2
Career		49	768	1,515	50.7	11,249	7.4	79	57	122.7	182	–533	–2.9	8

== Personal life ==
Anderson and his wife Mallory have three children.

He enjoys golfing, where he sometimes plays to a plus handicap. Anderson has also dabbled in caddying; in April 2025, he caddied for friend and PGA Tour pro Kevin Chappell in the Zurich Classic of New Orleans.

== See also ==
- List of Division I FBS passing yardage leaders
