= Scappoose, Oregon =

- City
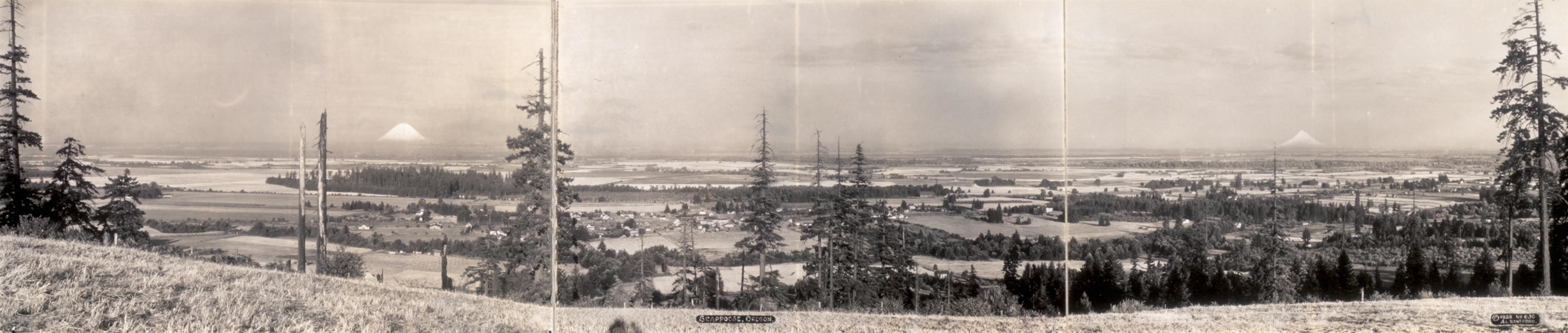
- The skyline of Scappoose circa 1929
- Motto: Proactive, Efficient, and Friendly Service
- Location in Oregon
- Coordinates: 45°45′15″N 122°52′31″W
- Country: United States
- State: Oregon
- County: Columbia
- Incorporated: 1921

Government
  - Type: Council-Manager
  - Body: Scappoose City Council
  - Mayor: Joe Backus
  - City Manager: Alexandra Rains
  - City Reporter: Susan Reeves

Area
  - Total: 3.44 sq mi (8.90 km^{2})
  - Land: 3.44 sq mi (8.90 km^{2})
  - Water: 0 sq mi (0.00 km^{2})
- Elevation: 59 ft (18 m)

Population (2020)
  - Total: 8,010
  - Density: 2,330.9/sq mi (899.97/km^{2})
- Time zone: UTC-8 (Pacific)
  - Summer (DST): UTC-7 (Pacific)
- ZIP code: 97056
- Area code: 503
- FIPS code: 41-65500
- GNIS feature ID: 2411837
- Website: www.scappoose.gov

Scappoose /skæˈpuːs/ is a city in Columbia County, Oregon, United States. It was named for a nearby stream, which drains the southern part of the county. The name "Scappoose" is of Native American origin, and is said to mean "gravelly plain." The population was 8,010 at the 2020 census.

== Government ==
The Mayor is elected for a two-year term and is chair of the City Council.

The City Manager supervisions and general management of all City operations and ensures that Council policy is carried out and that laws and municipal code are in compliance.

The City Council consists of a mayor and six councilors elected from the City at large who are residents of the City. Three Councilors each are elected for four year terms every two years. The Council sets policy and retains legislative authority. Meetings are usually held on the first and third Monday of every month.

== Geography ==
According to the United States Census Bureau, the city has a total area of 2.75 square miles (7.12 km^{2}), all of it land.

=== Climate ===
This region experiences warm and dry summers, with no average monthly temperatures above 71.6 °F (22.0 °C). According to the Köppen Climate Classification system, Scappoose has a warm-summer Mediterranean climate, abbreviated "Csb" on climate maps.

Climate data for Scappoose Industrial Airpark, Oregon
Month	Jan	Feb	Mar	Apr	May	Jun	Jul	Aug	Sep	Oct	Nov	Dec	Year
Record high °F (°C)	64 (18)	67 (19)	77 (25)	89 (32)	96 (36)	116 (47)	107 (42)	108 (42)	99 (37)	87 (31)	73 (23)	64 (18)	116 (47)
Mean daily maximum °F (°C)	46.8 (8.2)	51.2 (10.7)	56.3 (13.5)	61.0 (16.1)	68.2 (20.1)	73.1 (22.8)	81.0 (27.2)	82.0 (27.8)	76.3 (24.6)	63.6 (17.6)	52.6 (11.4)	46.1 (7.8)	63.2 (17.3)
Daily mean °F (°C)	40.3 (4.6)	42.7 (5.9)	46.6 (8.1)	50.5 (10.3)	57.2 (14.0)	61.9 (16.6)	67.8 (19.9)	68.2 (20.1)	63.1 (17.3)	53.2 (11.8)	44.8 (7.1)	39.9 (4.4)	53.0 (11.7)
Mean daily minimum °F (°C)	33.8 (1.0)	34.2 (1.2)	36.9 (2.7)	39.9 (4.4)	46.2 (7.9)	50.6 (10.3)	54.5 (12.5)	54.4 (12.4)	49.8 (9.9)	42.8 (6.0)	37.0 (2.8)	33.7 (0.9)	42.8 (6.0)
Record low °F (°C)	9 (−13)	16 (−9)	22 (−6)	27 (−3)	31 (−1)	37 (3)	43 (6)	42 (6)	33 (1)	19 (−7)	14 (−10)	5 (−15)	5 (−15)
Average precipitation inches (mm)	6.54 (166)	4.62 (117)	4.54 (115)	3.08 (78)	2.49 (63)	1.37 (35)	0.48 (12)	0.52 (13)	1.56 (40)	3.60 (91)	6.26 (159)	7.25 (184)	42.31 (1,075)
Average snowfall inches (cm)	2.7 (6.9)	1.1 (2.8)	0.1 (0.25)	0 (0)	0 (0)	0 (0)	0 (0)	0 (0)	0 (0)	0 (0)	0.5 (1.3)	2.3 (5.8)	6.7 (17)
Average precipitation days (≥ 0.01 in)	20.5	17.0	18.7	16.5	12.7	9.7	3.5	3.7	8.7	15.9	19.1	20.2	166.2
Average snowy days (≥ 0.1 in)	1.0	0.5	0.1	0	0	0	0	0	0	0	0.3	1.0	2.9
Mean daily daylight hours	9.2	10.4	12.0	13.6	15.0	15.6	15.2	14.0	12.5	10.9	9.5	8.8	12.2
Percentage possible sunshine	23	26	27	32	42	55	75	75	65	42	26	23	43
Source 1:
Source 2: Records and precip days, Sunshine

== Demographics ==
Historical population
Census	Pop.	Note	%±
1930	248		—
1940	336		35.5%
1950	659		96.1%
1960	923		40.1%
1970	1,859		101.4%
1980	3,213		72.8%
1990	3,529		9.8%
2000	4,976		41.0%
2010	6,592		32.5%
2020	8,010		21.5%
U.S. Decennial Census

=== 2020 census ===
As of the 2020 census, Scappoose had a population of 8,010 and a median age of 39.0 years; 24.1% of residents were under the age of 18 and 16.5% were 65 years of age or older. For every 100 females there were 95.4 males, and for every 100 females age 18 and over there were 93.7 males age 18 and over.

99.8% of residents lived in urban areas, while 0.2% lived in rural areas.

There were 3,094 households in Scappoose, of which 34.9% had children under the age of 18 living in them. Of all households, 51.1% were married-couple households, 16.2% were households with a male householder and no spouse or partner present, and 23.8% were households with a female householder and no spouse or partner present. About 24.6% of all households were made up of individuals and 12.9% had someone living alone who was 65 years of age or older.

There were 3,150 housing units, of which 1.8% were vacant. Among occupied housing units, 71.4% were owner-occupied and 28.6% were renter-occupied. The homeowner vacancy rate was 0.4% and the rental vacancy rate was 1.4%.

Racial composition as of the 2020 census
Race	Number	Percent
White	6,709	83.8%
Black or African American	70	0.9%
American Indian and Alaska Native	112	1.4%
Asian	136	1.7%
Native Hawaiian and Other Pacific Islander	31	0.4%
Some other race	208	2.6%
Two or more races	744	9.3%
Hispanic or Latino (of any race)	605	7.6%

=== 2010 census ===
As of the census of 2010, there were 6,592 people, 2,536 households, and 1,791 families residing in the city. The population density was 2,397.1 inhabitants per square mile (925.5/km^{2}). There were 2,698 housing units at an average density of 981.1 per square mile (378.8/km^{2}). The racial makeup of the city was 91.2% White, 0.4% African American, 1.2% Native American, 1.3% Asian, 0.2% Pacific Islander, 2.2% from other races, and 3.5% from two or more races. Hispanic or Latino of any race were 5.1% of the population.

There were 2,536 households, of which 37.3% had children under the age of 18 living with them, 53.0% were married couples living together, 12.2% had a female householder with no husband present, 5.4% had a male householder with no wife present, and 29.4% were non-families. 23.5% of all households were made up of individuals, and 9.8% had someone living alone who was 65 years of age or older. The average household size was 2.56 and the average family size was 3.01.

The median age in the city was 37.8 years. 26% of residents were under the age of 18; 6.9% were between the ages of 18 and 24; 27.7% were from 25 to 44; 26.2% were from 45 to 64; and 13.3% were 65 years of age or older. The gender makeup of the city was 48.1% male and 51.9% female. The median income for a household in the city was $47,796, and the median income for a family was $55,616. Males had a median income of $43,625 versus $27,346 for females. The per capita income for the city was $20,837. About 4.5% of families and 6.1% of the population were below the poverty line, including 7.7% of those under age 18 and 7.2% of those age 65 or over.

== Economy ==
In recent years, Scappoose has increasingly become a "bedroom" community of Portland, Oregon, with many commuting to jobs in the city. Dairies, farming, and logging played an important role in the early years of Scappoose's history. In the more recent past, several factories existed in the community and provided jobs. The town was home to a shoe factory, two candle factories, and a Steinfeld's Sauerkraut factory. The area still has gravel mines and the West Coast Shoe factory. Scappoose is also the home of Oregon Aero, Inc., a supplier of aeronautic seats and helmets.

On April 6, 2009, the Scappoose City Council voted to significantly reduce development fees in an effort in encourage new industrial and commercial development. Also, the council waived business license fees for Scappoose-based businesses in 2010.

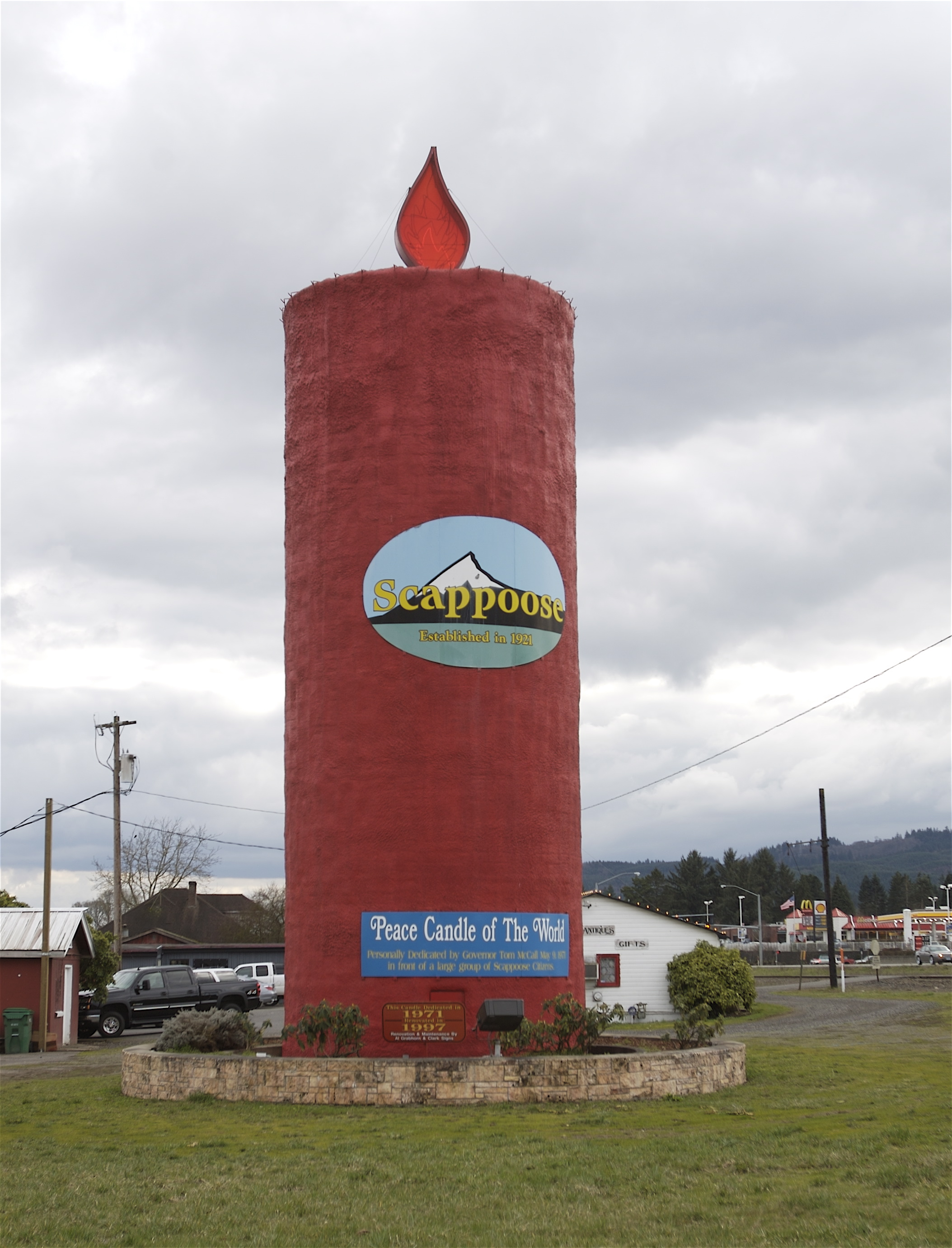
The Peace Candle of the World, toward the south end of Scappoose.

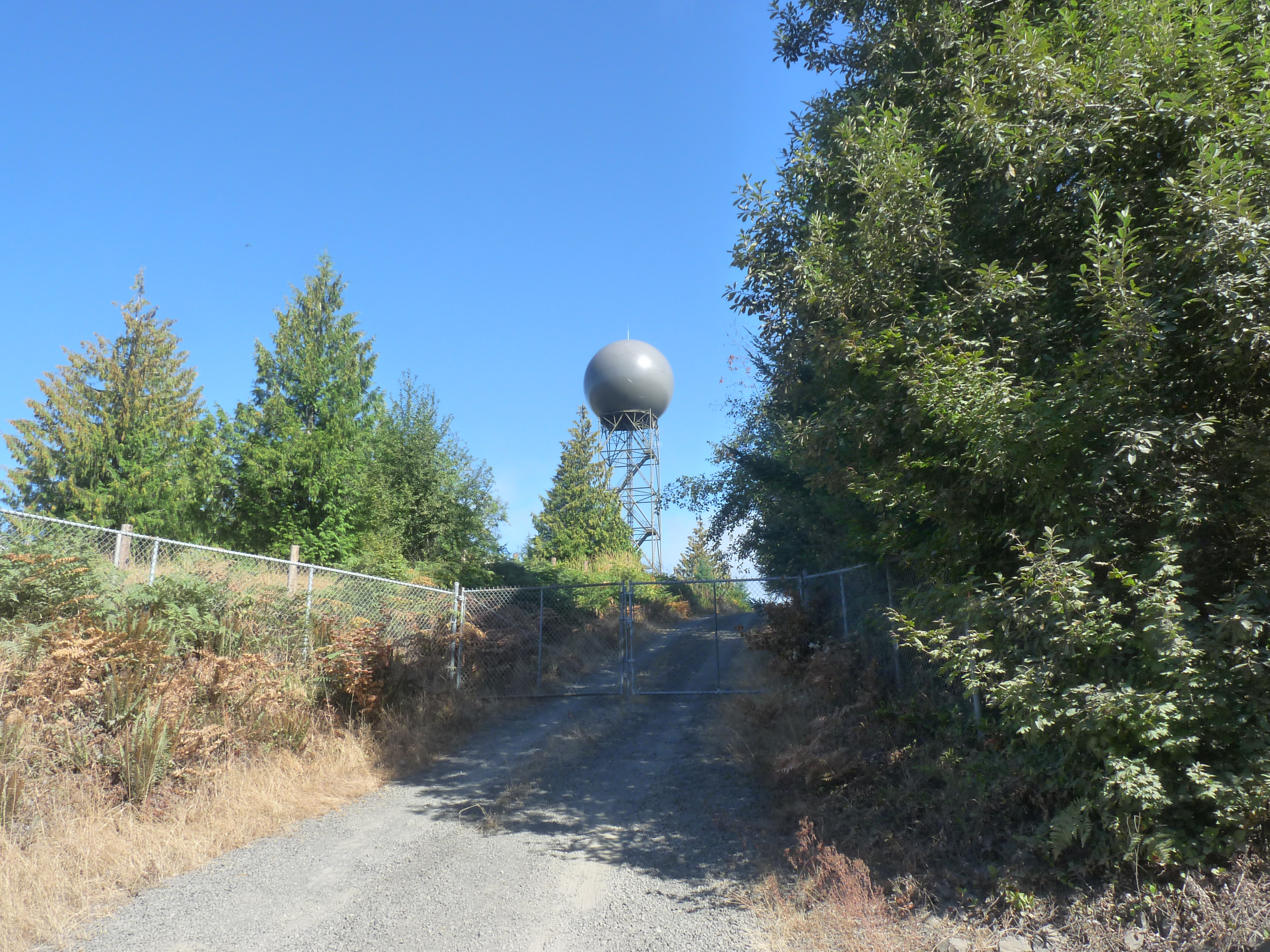
NEXRAD weather radar of the National Weather Service on Dixie Mountain Road.

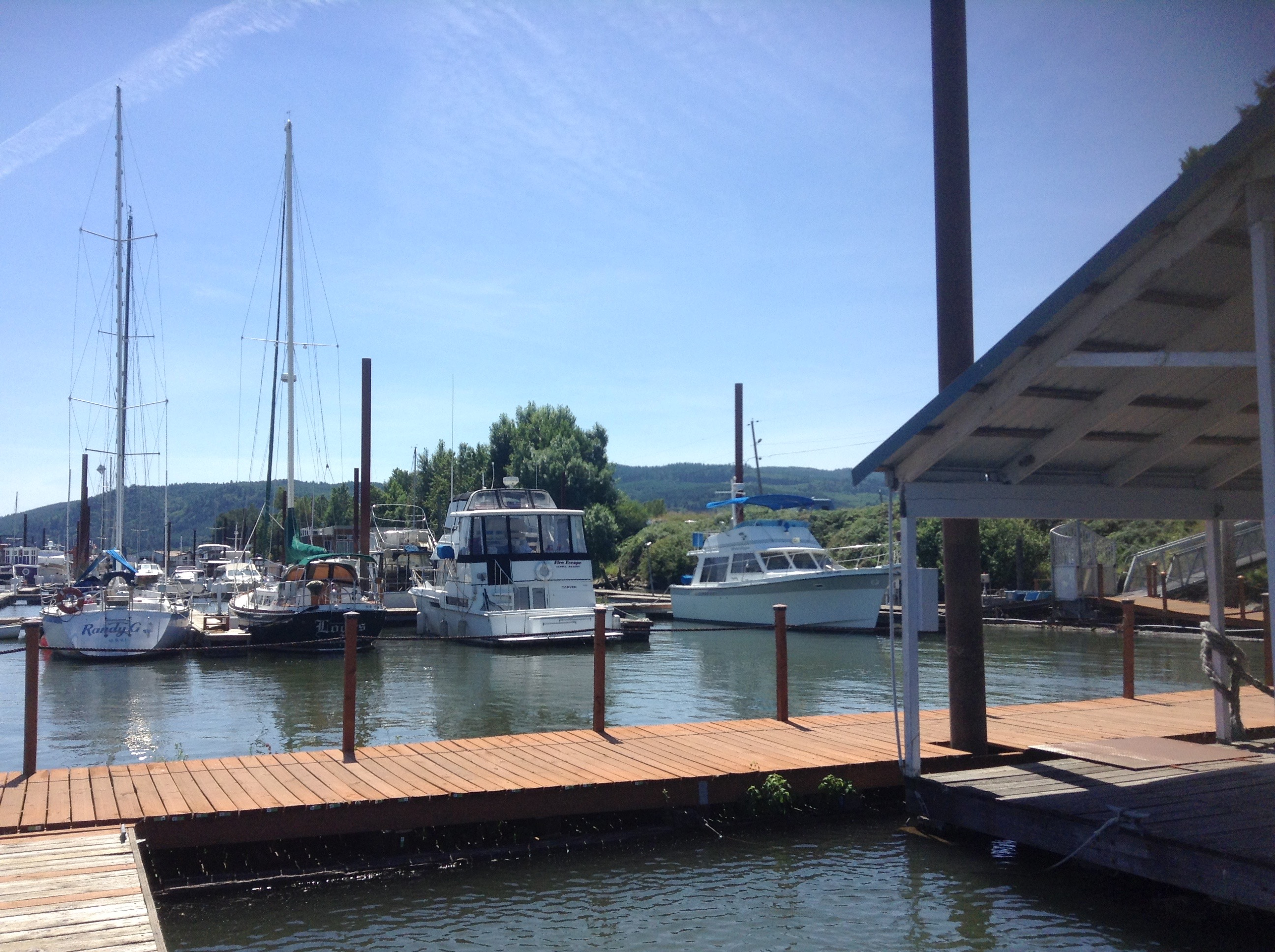
Scappoose Marina.

== Education ==
Grant Watts Elementary, Petersen Elementary, Scappoose Middle School and Scappoose High School are part of the Scappoose School District, which also has one school in Portland on Sauvie Island, and two schools in Warren, including Warren Elementary and the South Columbia Family School.

== Transportation ==
=== Airports ===
- Scappoose Industrial Airpark, a public-use airport 1 mile (1.6 km) northeast of the city.
- Chinook Ultralight Airpark, a private-use airport 3 miles (5 km) east of the city.
- Grabhorn's Airport, a private-use airport 3 miles (5 km) north of the city.

=== Rail lines ===
- Northern Pacific Railway

=== Highways ===
- U.S. Route 30 in Oregon

=== Public transit ===
- The county-operated Columbia County Rider bus service connects Scappoose with downtown Portland.

== Notable people ==
- Derek Anderson – former NFL quarterback and Pro Bowl selection in 2007, former Oregon State University quarterback
- CC Barber – Miss Oregon beauty pageant titleholder
- Roy Hennessey – nurseryman
- Bruce Hugo – politician
- Betsy Johnson – politician
- David Mayo – NFL linebacker for the Washington Commanders, former Texas State University linebacker
- Judith Pella – writer
- Greg Strobel – former college wrestling head coach at Lehigh, two-time NCAA champion for Oregon State
- Sara Jean Underwood – Playboy Playmate, July 2006; 2007 Playmate of the Year
- Willy Vlautin – author, singer, songwriter
