= Nathaniel Crosby (captain) =

Nathaniel Crosby Jr. was an early Columbia River boat captain who is credited by historians "with founding at least two towns, Toulon and St. Helens, Ore."

== Life ==
Nathaniel Crosby was born on November 3, 1810, in Brewster, Massachusetts.

Crosby Jr. and fellow speculator Thomas H. Smith operated a successful sawmill during the California Gold Rush, shipping timber to that region aboard their bark, the Louisiana. They also founded the town of Milton, a half mile above St. Helens, on Scappoose Bay, which eventually died out.

He was active in the sea trade between the Pacific Northwest and China in the 1850s, shipping timber from the American northwest to the Orient, and made his home in Hong Kong.

Crosby died in Hong Kong on December 17, 1856, and is buried there.

== Family ==
Crosby married Mary Lincoln and had a son, Nathaniel Crosby (1835 - 1885), and a daughter, Martha Crosby Burr (1840 - 1914).

Crosby was the great-grandfather of Bing and Bob Crosby.

== Commemoration ==
A World War II Liberty ship was named for Captain Crosby.
