= Sauvie Island Wildlife Area =

Protected area in Oregon, United States

- IUCN category V (protected landscape/seascape)
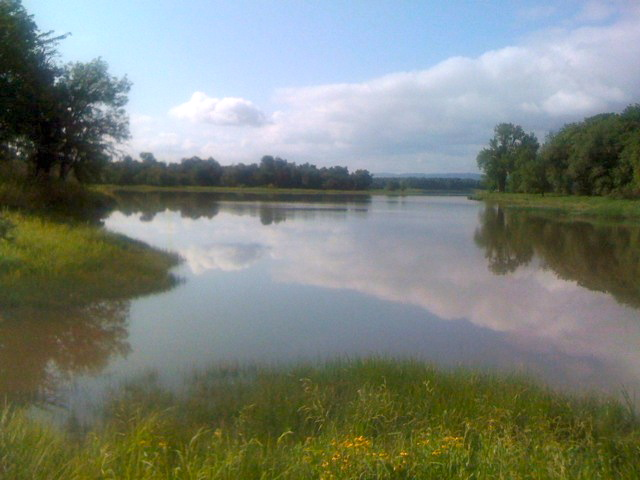
- Sturgeon Lake in the wildlife area

- Location within the United States
- Location: Columbia and Multnomah counties, Oregon
- Coordinates: 45°43′12″N 122°48′11″W
- Area: 12,000 acres (49 km^{2})
- Established: 1947
- Visitors: About one million (in 2009)
- Governing body: Oregon Department of Fish and Wildlife

The Sauvie Island Wildlife Area is a state game management area on Sauvie Island in the U.S. state of Oregon. It contains more than 12,000 acres (4,856 ha) for mixed use including hunting, fishing, canoeing, kayaking, birdwatching and hiking. Established in 1974, it is located in both Multnomah and Columbia counties.

The wildlife area covers the northern half of the island of 24,000 acres (9,700 ha), which lies at the confluence of the Willamette and Columbia rivers. Although the southern half of the island is home to about 500 people as well as farms and related businesses, the northern half, an important stop on the Pacific Flyway, preserves habitat for many kinds of waterfowl. About 300 species of wildlife, including bald eagles, pintails, red-tailed hawks, American kestrels, and many others, frequent the island.

Wetlands and bodies of water, including 21 lakes as well as sloughs, connecting channels, and streams such as the Gilbert River, abound in the wildlife area. Boat ramps provide access to paddlers along the Gilbert, at Oak Island in Sturgeon Lake, and at Steelman Lake, St. Helens, and along the Multnomah Channel. Sandy Columbia River beaches, including one that is clothing-optional, draw large numbers of people to the area's northern edge.

== History ==
In 1940, the state bought 5 acres (2.0 ha) on Sauvie Island to protect waterfowl that winter on Sturgeon Lake. The wildlife area was established in 1947, and more land was acquired through 1989. In 2009, Sauvie Island Wildlife Area recorded 989,361 visitor-days; about 55 percent of them involved the river beaches.
