= Patrick Cantellow =

British youth employment activist

Patrick Cantellow BEM is a British youth employment activist from Kent. He founded Swale Young People and later chaired the Youth Ambassador Board of Youth Employment UK. He was awarded the British Empire Medal in the 2022 Birthday Honours for services to youth employment in Kent.

== Early life and education ==
Cantellow grew up on the Isle of Sheppey and later in Sittingbourne, Kent. He attended Fulston Manor School in Sittingbourne, where he received a Diana Award in 2014 for mentoring vulnerable students. In 2015, he was named Young Volunteer of the Year at the Volunteer Swale Awards for his charity fundraising and community work. He also volunteered with the National Citizen Service and with children's charities.

== Career ==
In 2015, Cantellow founded Swale Young People to improve employment opportunities for young people in the Swale area. As chief executive, he led the Young Ambassador Network, which provided volunteering, training and social action opportunities and a Young Enterprise Network to support local young people in starting their own businesses. It was part of a group led by Brogdale CIC that developed a business plan for The Mill, a proposed skatepark on derelict land at Milton Creek in Sittingbourne. In 2018, he opened the Swale Youth Conference in Sittingbourne, sponsored by the #iwill youth social action campaign, though the organisation was dissolved later the same year.

In 2015, Cantellow joined the Youth Employment UK as a youth ambassador. He represented the organisation at the European Congress of Local Governments in Kraków in 2017. In 2019, he became chair of Youth Employment UK's Youth Ambassador Board and was appointed one of its non-executive directors in 2020. He remained a board member until 2023.

He also served as a youth ambassador for the EXCEPT research project under the European Union's Horizon 2020 programme and served as an ambassador for the NSPCC and CXK. In 2019, he became the Kent and East Sussex vice-chair of the South East Young Apprentice Ambassador Network and co-hosted the South East ceremony of the National Apprenticeship Awards. He has also served on the board of Sheppey College.

== Honours ==
Cantellow received a Points of Light award for his work with Swale Young People. In the 2022 Birthday Honours, Cantellow was awarded the British Empire Medal (BEM) for services to youth employment in Kent.
