= Sauvie Island UFO =

Concrete ship abandoned on Sauvie Island, Oregon, in the 1970s

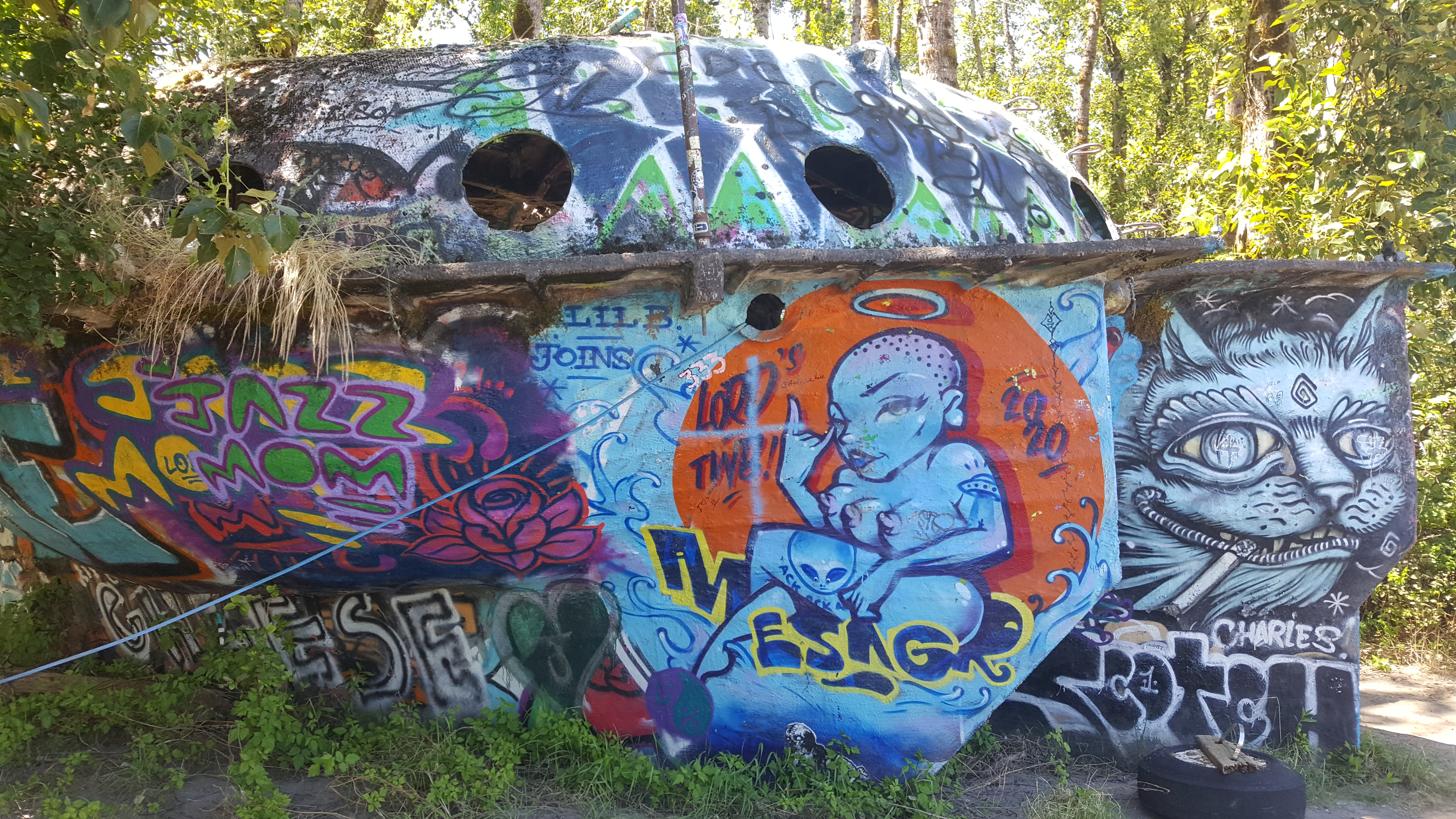
- The abandoned structure in 2022
- Design: Richard Ensign
- Location: Sauvie Island, Oregon, U.S.
- Location within Oregon
- Coordinates: 45°47′3″N 122°47′6″W

Sauvie Island UFO is the name given to the derelict hull of an experimental concrete ship designed and built in the 1970s in Oregon. The ship, a sailboat, ran aground while on the Columbia River and was abandoned on Sauvie Island. The concrete hull is now covered in graffiti and has become something of a local attraction. Sauvie Island UFO was designed by Richard Ensign.
