= Coon Island (Oregon) =

Island in Oregon, United States

- Interactive map of Coon Island

Geography
- Coordinates: 45°46′4″N 122°49′3″W
- Adjacent to: Multnomah Channel
- Area: 9.3 ha (23 acres)
- Highest elevation: 5 m (16 ft)

Administration
- United States
- State: Oregon
- County: Columbia

Demographics
- Population: 0

Coon Island is an island in the Multnomah Channel in Columbia County, Oregon, United States. The entire island is a park known as JJ Collins Marine Memorial Park. Coon Island includes docks on both sides, and is primarily used for recreational activities such as picnicking, boating, camping, and birdwatching.
