= Multnomah Channel =

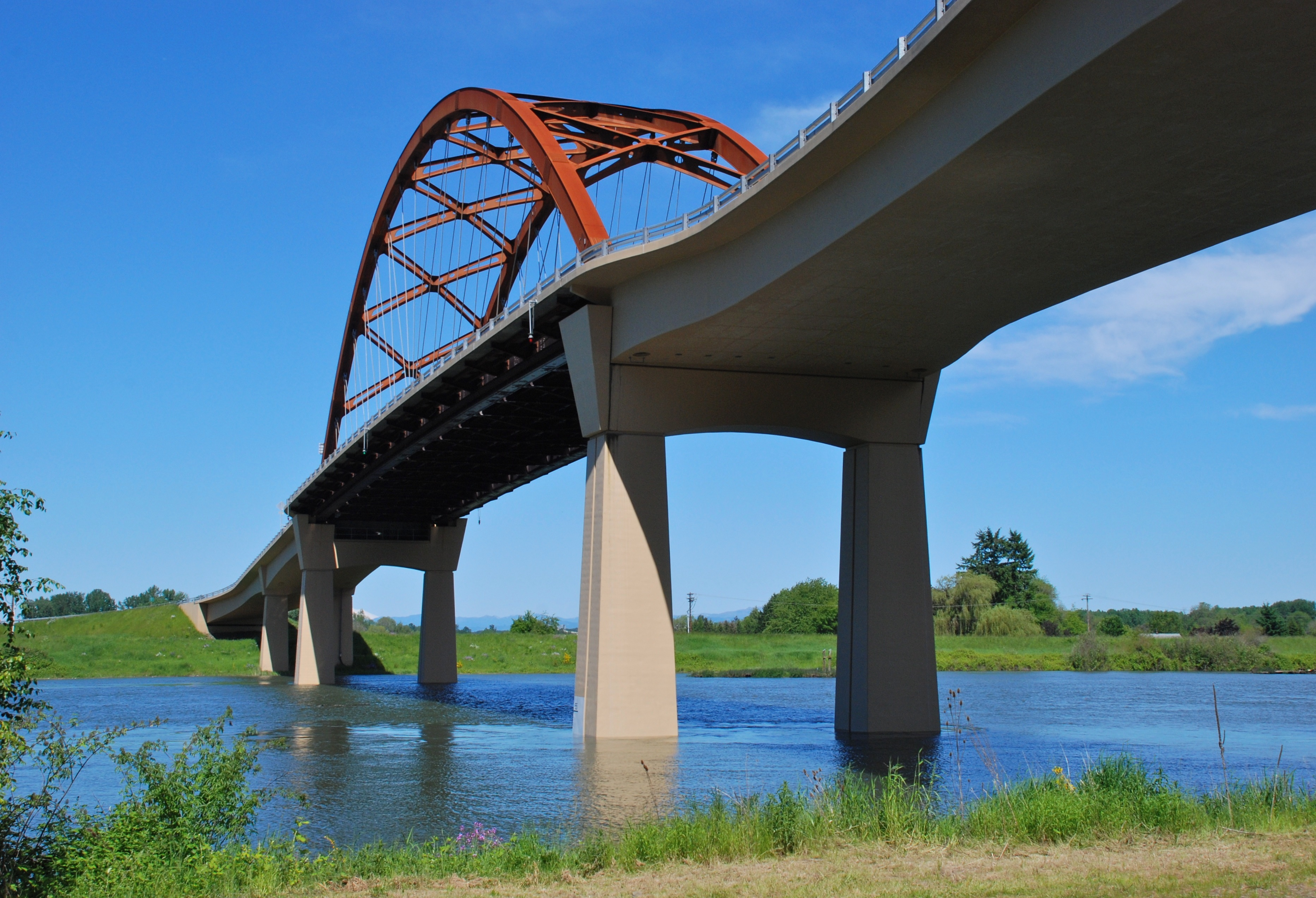
- Passing under the Wapato Bridge

- Location of the mouth of the Multnomah Channel in Oregon

Location
- Country: United States
- State: Oregon
- County: Multnomah and Columbia

Physical characteristics
- Source: Willamette River
  - location: Portland, Multnomah County
  - coordinates: 45°37′08″N 122°47′47″W
  - elevation: 19 ft (5.8 m)
- Mouth: Columbia River
  - location: St. Helens, Columbia County
  - coordinates: 45°51′30″N 122°47′36″W
  - elevation: 8 ft (2.4 m)
- Length: 21.5 mi (34.6 km)

The Multnomah Channel is a 21.5-mile (34.6 km) distributary of the Willamette River. It diverges from the main stem a few miles upstream of the main stem's confluence with the Columbia River in Multnomah County in the U.S. state of Oregon. The channel flows northwest then north around Sauvie Island to meet the Columbia River near the city of St. Helens, in Columbia County.

Chinook people, the Multnomahs, lived in villages along the channel at the time of European exploration of the Columbia River in the late 18th and early 19th centuries. Flanked in the 21st century by moorages, marinas, and parks, and populated by a wide variety of fish, the channel offers many opportunities for recreation.

== Course ==
Constrained by dikes, the channel is about one-third as wide as the lower Willamette main stem. U.S. Route 30 and tracks of the Burlington Northern Railroad run roughly parallel to the channel, and to its left, between its source and the Multnomah–Columbia county border at about the channel's river mile (RM) 12.5 or river kilometer (RK) 20.1.

In its first 0.5 miles (0.80 km), the channel receives Miller Creek from the left, then passes under Wapato Bridge, which carries Northwest Sauvie Island Road. Below the bridge, Ennis Creek enters from the left, then McCarthy Creek from the left at RM 18 (RK 29). Further along, Johns Creek enters from the left, and then Joy Creek enters from the left where the channel leaves Multnomah County and enters Columbia County. About 8 miles (13 km) from the mouth, the channel flows around Coon Island. Shortly thereafter, Crane Slough, which drains Crane's Lake, and the Gilbert River, which drains Sturgeon Lake, enter from the right. Then the channel receives Jackson Creek from the left and Cunningham Slough from the right before flowing around Louse Island and merging with Scappoose Bay, which is on the left. St. Helens is on the left as the channel enters the Columbia, about 86.5 miles (139.2 km) from the larger stream's mouth on the Pacific Ocean.

A few islands, most notably Coon Island and Louse Island, are located within the channel.

== Name and history ==
The channel had a variety of names before the United States Board on Geographic Names (USBGN) agreed to Multnomah Channel in 1913. In 1792, William Robert Broughton was the first European explorer to discover the channel. He named it Calls River, probably after the English engineer Sir John Call. The early 19th century explorers Lewis and Clark called it Wappato Inlet after Wappato Island, the name they used for Sauvie Island. In the 1840s, nautical surveyor Charles Wilkes referred to the channel as Warrior Branch because it met the Columbia River at Warrior Point, on the northern tip of Sauvie Island. Before its renaming by the USBGN, the channel had become known as Willamette Slough.

Multnomah, used by Lewis and Clark to refer to the main stem of the Willamette, is what the Chinook people living on Sauvie Island in the early 19th century called themselves. Several Chinook villages with longhouses occupied sites along the channel before the explorers' arrival. Sauvie Island and its mild climate were suited to wapato, a root vegetable, and provided access to fish and game. A large village, one of several on the island, was situated near its southeastern tip, where the channel begins. Another village, with 28 houses and more than 1,000 residents, was sited along the west shore of Scappoose Bay near the downstream end of the channel.

== Recreation ==
The channel offers many moorages for boats and houseboats. Private moorages and marinas, some with public fee-for-service boat ramps, lie along the channel between the main stem and the Sauvie Island Bridge. Further downriver is the Sauvie Island Public Boat Ramp at RM 18 (RK 29), followed by Hadley's Landing and its tie-up and trail 0.5 miles (0.80 km) later. The Sauvie Island Wildlife Area begins at about the halfway point on the channel and extends from there to the mouth along the right bank. A major stopover for birds, it can be reached by boat from the Gilbert River Boat Ramp at RM 6 (RK 10). Parks near the mouth include Nob Hill Nature Park and Sand Island Marine Park at St. Helens, St. Helens Landing, Columbia View Park at Scappoose Bay, and Scappoose Bay Landing.

A productive fishery for spring Chinook salmon, the channel is also home to sturgeon, walleye, shad, brown bullhead catfish, and other small fish, and crayfish. The average Chinook entering the channel weighs 18 pounds (8.2 kg), but some weigh as much as 40 pounds (18 kg). Oregon's lower-Willamette health advisories on consumption of resident (non-migratory) fish, especially large bottom feeders, apply to the Multnomah Channel as well as the main stem.

== See also ==
- List of longest streams of Oregon
- List of rivers of Oregon

== Works cited ==
- McArthur, Lewis A.; McArthur, Lewis L. (2003) [1928]. Oregon Geographic Names (7th ed.). Portland, Oregon: Oregon Historical Society Press. ISBN 0-87595-277-1.
- Sheehan, Madelynne Diness (2005). Fishing in Oregon: The Complete Oregon Fishing Guide, 10th edition. Scappoose, Oregon: Flying Pencil Publications. ISBN 0-916473-15-5.
- Williams, Travis (2009). The Willamette River Field Guide. Portland, Oregon: Timber Press. ISBN 978-0-88192-866-2.
