= Port of Columbia County =

Port authority in Columbia County, Oregon, U.S.

- Interactive map of Port of Columbia County

Location
- Country: United States
- Location: St. Helens, Oregon
- Coordinates: 45.8943°N 122.8096°W

Details
- Opened: 1940
- Governing body: Board of Port Commissioners

Statistics
- Website www.portofcolumbiacounty.org

The Port of Columbia County, formerly the Port of St. Helens, is the port authority for Columbia County, Oregon, United States. The port is a municipal corporation formed under state law to engage in economic development activities. Under Oregon law, port districts have a broad range of economic development powers. The Port of Columbia County owns and operates properties throughout its district from the Clatsop County line in the northwest of Columbia County, to the Multnomah County line in the southeast, a six-mile-wide band that follows 51 miles of the Columbia River within Columbia County. The boundaries include the cities of Scappoose, Warren, St. Helens, Columbia City, Rainier and Clatskanie. The Port of Columbia County also owns and operates the Scappoose Airport in Scappoose and Scappoose Bay Marine Park in Warren.

The Board of Port Commissioners is elected by district residents. The board sets policy, approves a budget, hires an executive director, and does other things in the best interest of district residents.
