= Bybee–Howell House =

Historic house in Oregon, United States

- U.S. National Register of Historic Places
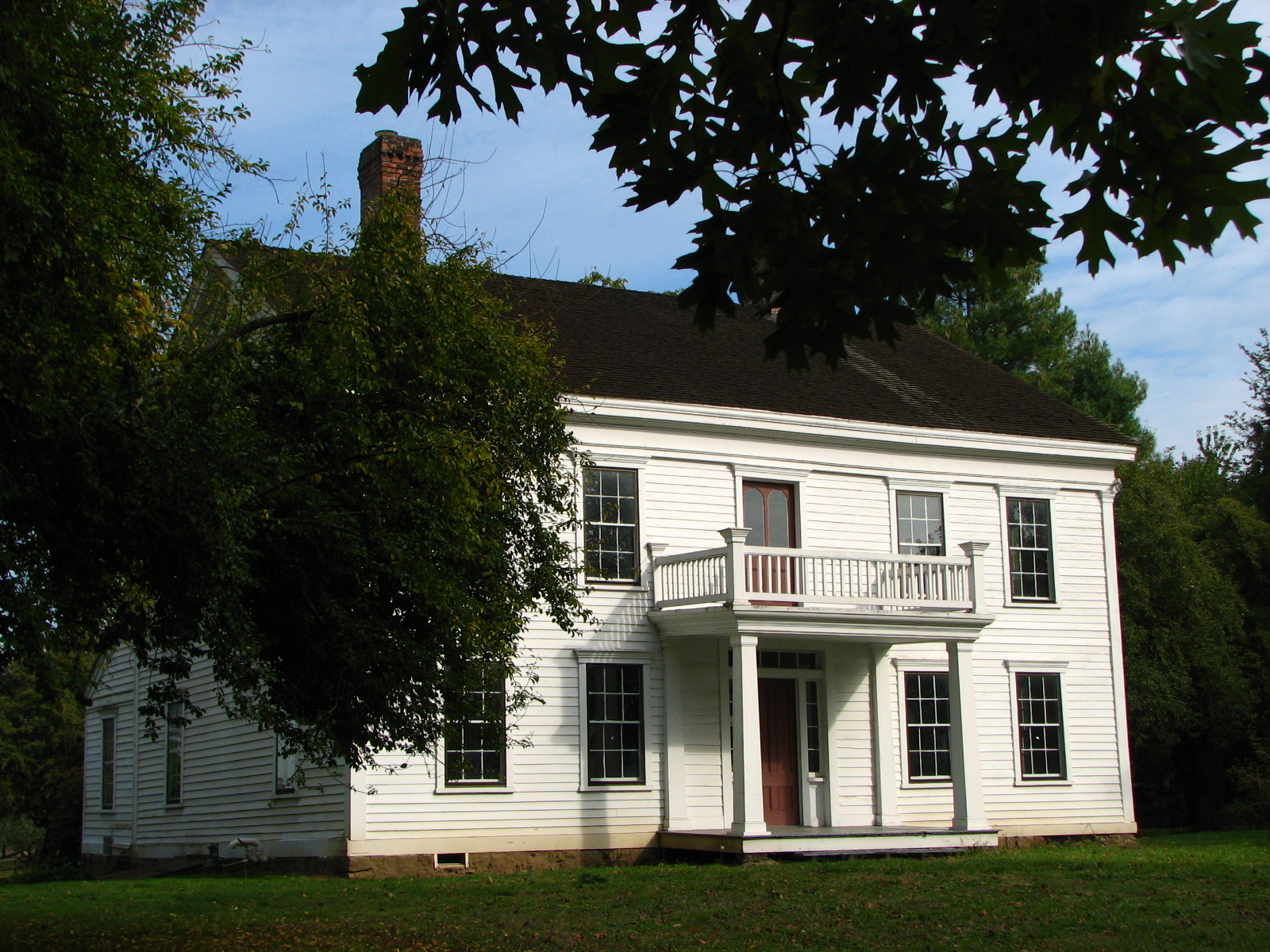
- The Bybee–Howell House in 2008
- Location: 13901 NW Howell Park Road; Sauvie Island, Oregon
- Nearest city: Portland
- Coordinates: 45°38′29″N 122°49′08″W
- Built: 1856
- Architect: James Bybee
- Architectural style: Classical Revival
- NRHP reference No.: 74001716
- Added to NRHP: November 5, 1974

The Bybee–Howell House is a historic house, located on Sauvie Island (in the Columbia River), Oregon, United States. It is listed on the National Register of Historic Places. As of 2010, it is part of Howell Territorial Park, administered by the Metro regional government.
