= Nob Hill Nature Park =

Coordinates: 45.8577°N 122.7991°W

- Interactive map of Nob Hill Nature Park
- Type: Woodland
- Nearest city: St. Helens, Oregon, U.S.
- Open: Dawn to dusk

Nob Hill Nature Park is a 6-acre oak woodland located in St. Helens, Oregon, 30 miles (48 km) north of Portland, Oregon. Situated on a basalt bluff, it overlooks the Columbia River, at the point where Multnomah Channel joins the Columbia. Notable flora include white oak trees (Quercus garryana), as well as native wildflowers such as camas, trillium, iris, and larkspur. A variety of invasive species are also present, including blackberry, English ivy, Lunaria (or money plant), vinca, mullein, thistle, and tansy.

It is maintained by a community group (The Friends of Nob Hill Nature Park) which holds volunteer work parties twice yearly, in April and November. The proposed goal of maintenance activities is to return the park to a more natural and historically representative state, i.e. by removing invasive plants and planting native ones. These efforts are co-sponsored by a community partner group, Scappoose Bay Watershed Council. It is thought that this area was travelled through by the Lewis and Clark Expedition.

Parking is located near the park's main trailhead at 451 Plymouth St, St. Helens, OR 97051. Photos from the park are available on the city's website. The park is open from dawn to dusk. Dogs must be leashed.
