= Scappoose Bay =

Body of water in Oregon, United States

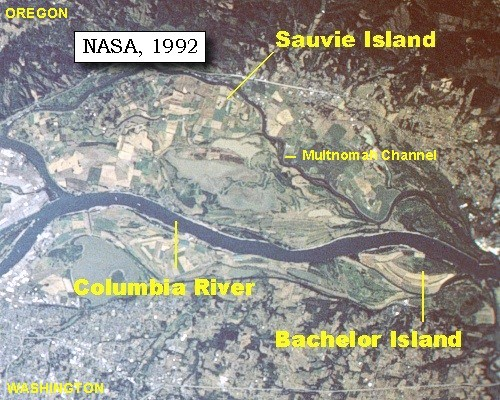
- Scappoose Bay to the right (north) of Sauvie Island along Multnomah Channel.
- Interactive map of Scappoose Bay
- Location: Columbia County, Oregon, United States
- Coordinates: 45°48′45″N 122°50′34″W
- Type: Bay
- Primary inflows: Milton Creek, Scappoose Creek
- Primary outflows: Multnomah Channel
- Catchment area: 114.8 square miles (297 km^{2})
- Surface elevation: 3 feet (0.91 m)

Scappoose Bay is a slough of Multnomah Channel, a distributary of the Willamette River, about 1 mile (1.6 km) upstream of where the channel meets the Columbia River in Columbia County, Oregon, United States.

It is surrounded by a broad wetland area full of small ponds and other waterways across from Sauvie Island. It lies between Scappoose to the south and St. Helens to the north. A few small streams, including Milton Creek and Scappoose Creek drain from the east slopes of the Oregon Coast Range into the bay. Lying in the upper portion of the Columbia River Estuary, Scappoose Bay is tidal but is a freshwater body.

The original inhabitants of the Scappoose Bay area were the Chinookan peoples who hunted, fished, and gathered in the area. During the 19th century, American settlers developed the area, clearing land for farming. Wood product manufacturing began in the early 20th Century. Three now-defunct factories left behind hazardous materials.

Scappoose Bay is an important home for several fish species. Sturgeon poaching has become a problem there in recent years. An advisory from the Oregon Department of Environmental Quality against consuming fish and shellfish from the bay remains in effect due to contamination from former industrial activity.
