= KOHI =

- St. Helens, Oregon; United States
- Broadcast area: Columbia County, Oregon
- Frequency: 1600 (kHz)
- Branding: AM 1600 KOHI

Programming
- Format: News–talk–sports
- Affiliations: Liberty News Radio Network; The Liberty Radio Network

Ownership
- Owner: The Mountain Broadcasting LLC

History
- First air date: February 1959

Technical information
- Licensing authority: FCC
- Facility ID: 70467
- Class: D
- Power: 1,000 watts (day); 12 watts (night)
- Transmitter coordinates: 45°51′14.41″N 122°49′15.37″W

Links
- Public license information: Public file; LMS
- Website: www.am1600kohi.com

KOHI (1600 AM) is a radio station in St. Helens, 35 miles (56 km) north of Portland, Oregon, on U.S. Route 30. It serves the cities of St. Helens, Scappoose, Salmon Creek, La Center, Woodland, and Kalama, the last four of which are located in Washington. The station is owned by The Mountain Broadcasting LLC and is also affiliated with Liberty News Radio Network,; it is also broadcast live on tunein.com.

First put on the air in 1959, AM-1600 KOHI has been serving eastern Columbia County for over 66 years. It also airs in part of western Cowlitz County, Washington.

KOHI features local news, weather, information about school closings, and information about upcoming events; programs it airs include Liberty Roundtable and locally produced Sports Talk Saturday at 10am. It airs the internationally syndicated programs Dr. Daliah every night at 9pm and The Paracast, which deals with paranormal topics including parapsychology and UFOs, at 12 midnight. KOHI's local programming includes Keep it Local Columbia County every Monday-Friday from 6:05-7am. As of August 2011, the station also runs meetings of the Columbia County Board of Commissioners.

It also broadcasts The Keep It Local Business Update Show now from 9am-10am Monday through Friday featuring local events and businesses from Columbia County. Also featuring Town Talk Cafe with Steve Toschi from 10am-11am Monday-Friday. KOHI operates 24 hours a day.

It is the only AM broadcast station in Columbia County.
