= Wapato Bridge =

Bridge near Portland, Oregon, United States

Wapato Bridge (2008-present)
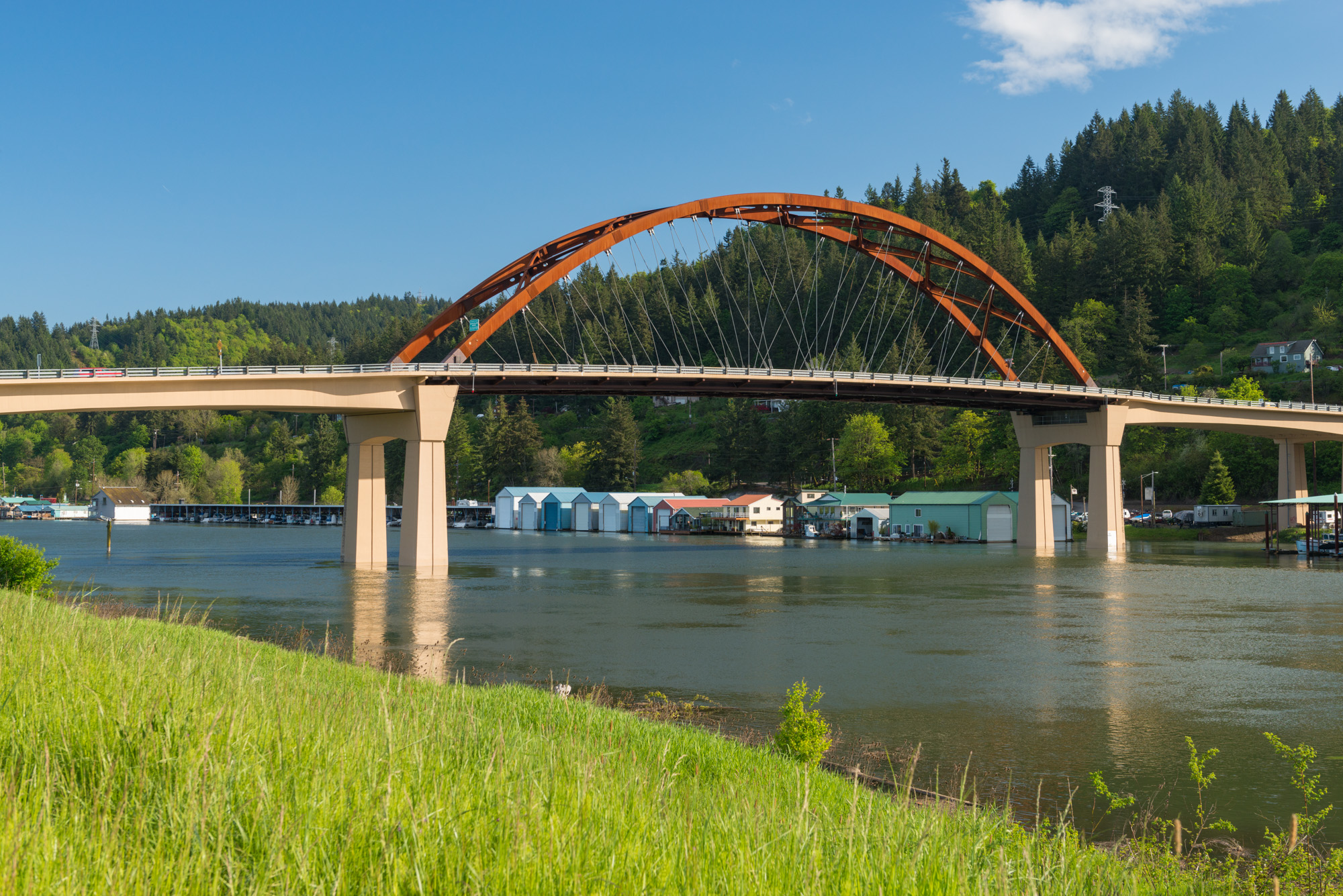
- Wapato Bridge in 2017
- Coordinates: 45.628021°N 122.816307°W
- Carries: Access from U.S. Route 30 to Sauvie Island
- Crosses: Multnomah Channel
- Locale: Sauvie Island, in Multnomah County, near Portland, Oregon
- Official name: Wapato Bridge (2023–)
- Other name: Sauvie Island Bridge (1950–2023)

Characteristics
- Total length: Old bridge: 1,185 feet (361 m)
- Width: 66 feet (20 m)
- Longest span: 360 feet (110 m)
- Clearance below: 80 feet (24 m)

History
- Opened: June 23, 2008

Location
- Interactive map of Wapato Bridge (2008-present)

The Wapato Bridge, formerly known as the Sauvie Island Bridge, crosses the Multnomah Channel of the Willamette River near Portland, Oregon, United States. The original Parker truss bridge, built in 1950 with a 200-foot (61 m) main span, was replaced with a tied arch bridge with a 360-foot (110 m) span in 2008 due to cracks discovered in 2001.

Sauvie Island Bridge (1950–2008)
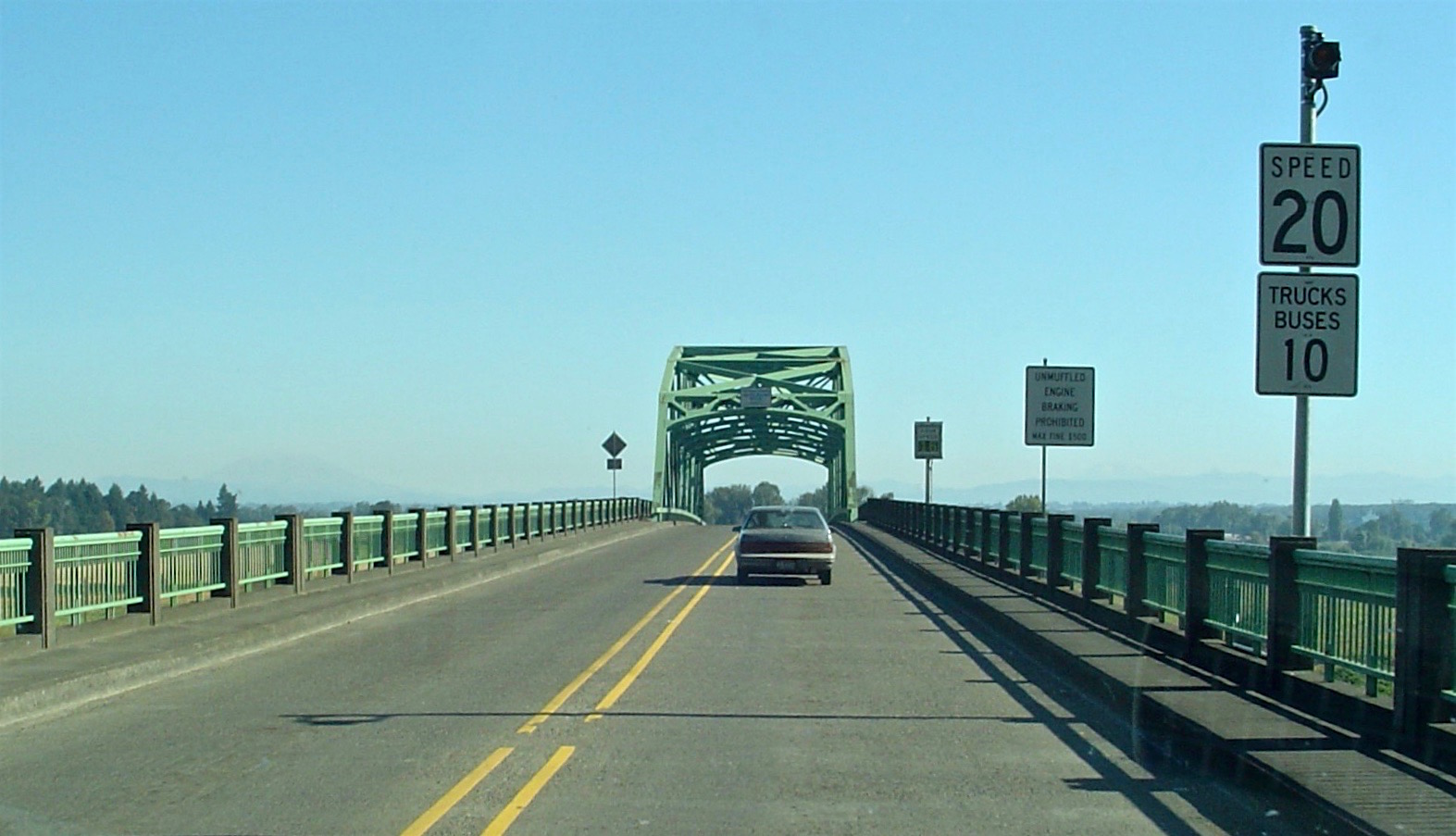
- The original bridge in 2005.
- Coordinates: 45°37′41″N 122°48′58″W
- Locale: Portland, Oregon

Characteristics
- Design: Parker truss
- Total length: 1,198 ft (365 m)
- Width: 41 ft (12 m)
- Longest span: 200 ft (61 m)
- Clearance below: 80 ft (24 m)

History
- Opened: December 30, 1950
- Closed: June 23, 2008

In November 2022, the Multnomah County Board of Commissioners voted to rename the bridge in honor of the Native Americans who originally lived on Sauvie Island. Subsequently, Wapato Bridge was chosen as the new name, and the change went into effect in November 2023.

== Old bridge ==
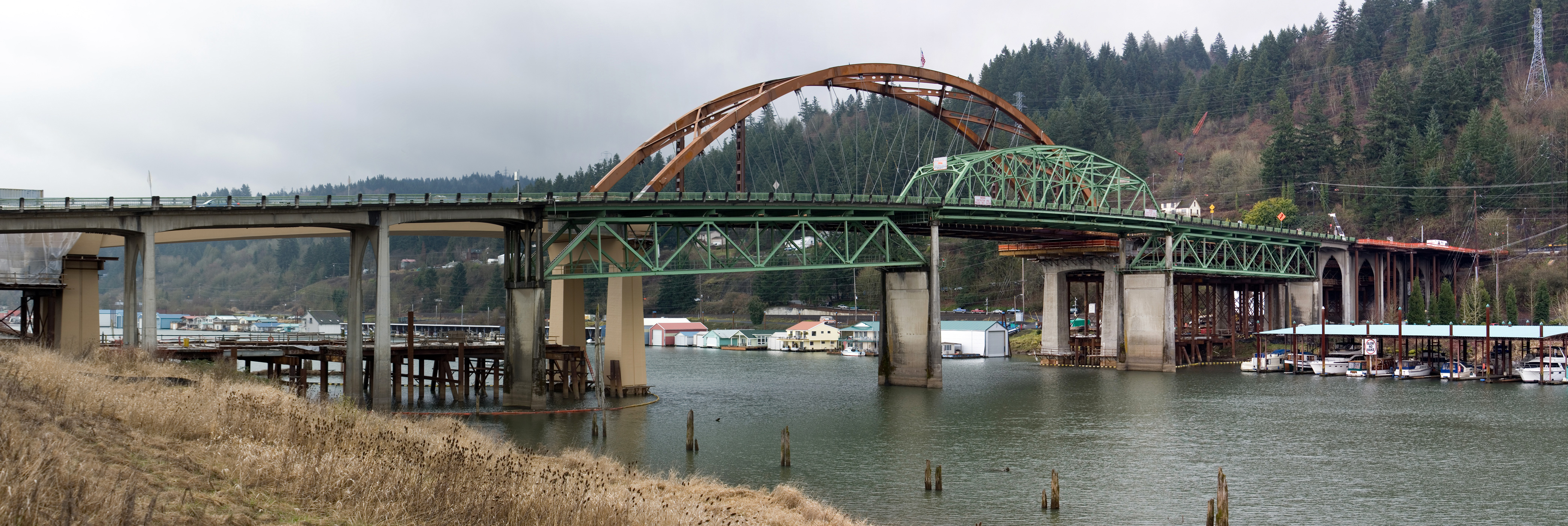
Old and new bridges, March 2008

Opened on December 30, 1950, the first bridge to Sauvie Island replaced the Sauvie Island Ferry. The $900,000 bridge, equivalent to $12 million today, was designed by the Oregon Department of Transportation and built by Gilpin Construction. Oregon transferred ownership to Multnomah County in 1951. Composed of three steel truss spans, it was a total of 1,198 feet (365 m) long, with the main span measuring 200 feet (61 m) in length. The approach spans were built of reinforced concrete girders. Green in color, the bridge was 41 feet (12 m) wide and carried two lanes of traffic and had sidewalks on both sides. The main span, a Parker truss, sat 80 feet (24 m) above the water line and handled an average of 3,800 vehicles per day.

== New bridge ==
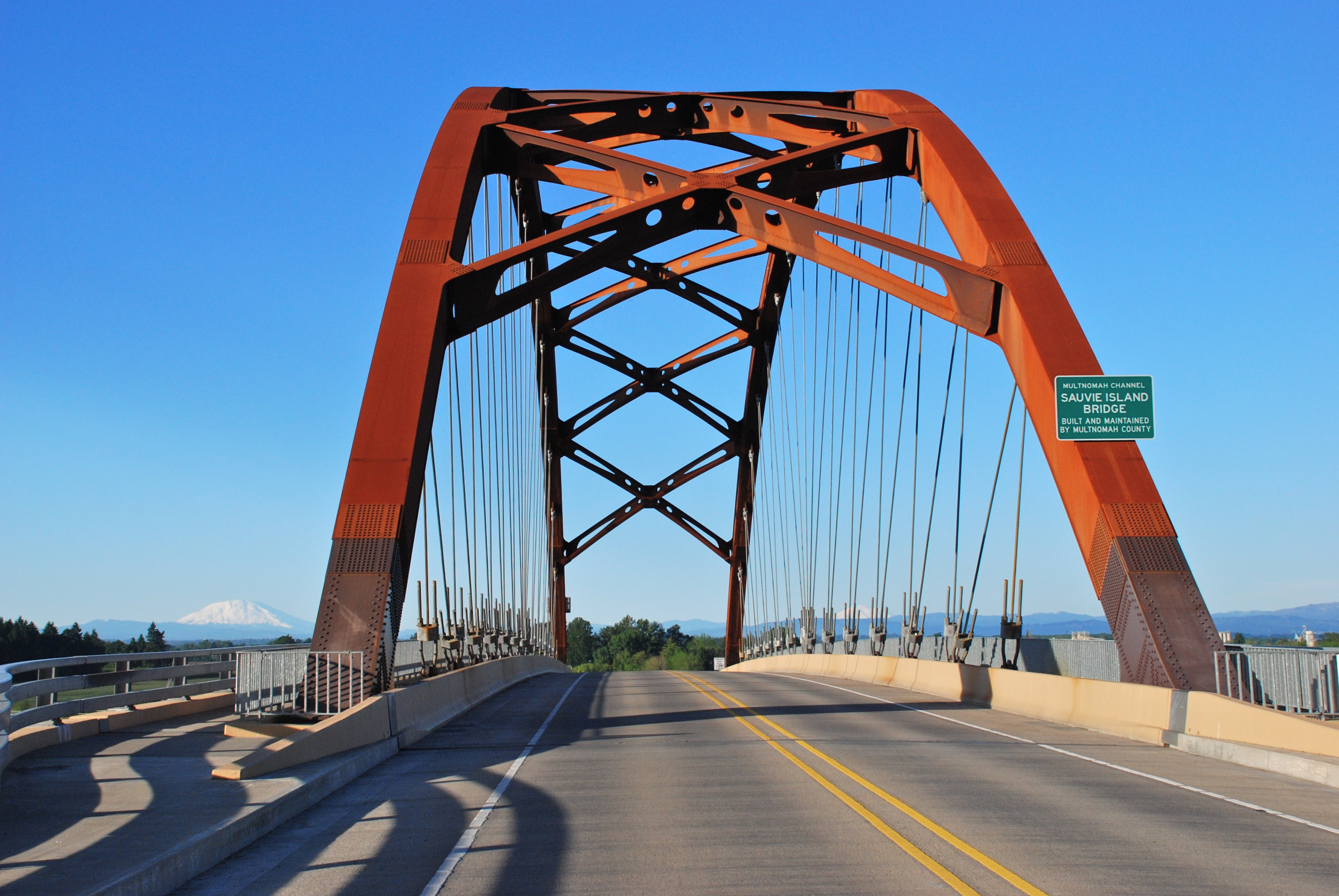
A roadway-level view of the new bridge, with Mt. St. Helens in the background

After cracks were found in the 1950 span in 2001, Multnomah County restricted weight and speed on the bridge. Early designs for a new bridge were submitted in July 2004, and groundbreaking was held on January 4, 2006. The new $38 million span was designed by H2L2 Architecture with David Evans & Associates as the design engineers, and built by Max J. Kuney Company. Located at river mile three, the main span is 360 feet (110 m) long and rests 80 feet (24 m) above the water. The main span is of a tied arch design constructed of steel, while the approach spans are a box-girder style using pre-stressed concrete. The bridge has two lanes of traffic with shoulders and sidewalks on both sides for a total width of 66 feet (20 m). The bridge was floated into place after it was constructed.

In March 2006, then-city commissioner Sam Adams proposed reusing the Sauvie Island bridge span as a bicycle/pedestrian bridge over Interstate 405 in downtown Portland, as part of the Burnside/Couch Transportation and Urban Design Plan. A coalition of Portland community groups, including the Pearl District Neighborhood Association and the Bicycle Transportation Alliance, supported the idea. Adams ultimately retracted the proposal, realizing the cost would likely be more than the $5.5 million he had originally stated.

The $43 million new bridge opened June 23, 2008. The old bridge was removed in August 2008 and was scrapped at Schnitzer Steel Industries.

In November 2023, following a vote by the county's board of commissioners a year earlier, the Sauvie Island Bridge was renamed Wapato Bridge, in honor of the Native Americans who originally lived on the island.

== See also ==
- List of crossings of the Willamette River
