= Gilbert River (Oregon) =

River in the United States of America

- Location of the mouth of the Gilbert River in Oregon
- Etymology: For a Hudson's Bay Company employee said to have drowned in the river

Location
- Country: United States
- State: Oregon
- County: Multnomah, Columbia

Physical characteristics
- Source: Sauvie Island
  - location: near south end east of Burlington, Multnomah County
  - coordinates: 45°38′58″N 122°48′13″W
  - elevation: 19 ft (5.8 m)
- Mouth: Multnomah Channel
  - location: near north end east of Scappoose, Columbia County
  - coordinates: 45°47′21″N 122°47′59″W
  - elevation: 10 ft (3.0 m)

The Gilbert River is a tributary of the Multnomah Channel on Sauvie Island in the U.S. state of Oregon. About 14 miles (23 km) long, it flows from near the south end of the island into Sturgeon Lake and then north from the lake into the channel, a distributary of the Willamette River.

The river loses only 9 feet (3 m) of elevation between source and mouth. It enters the channel about 6 miles (10 km) from its confluence with the Columbia River. Its three named tributaries from source to mouth are Ash, Jack, and Mud sloughs, and it connects by water to a complex of lakes across the island including Steelman, Round, Gay, Racetrack, Malarky, and McNary, as well as Sturgeon.

The river is navigable by canoes and shallow-draft boats between Sturgeon Lake and the mouth. A mooring float with no shore access lies about a quarter mile from the mouth.

The stream was named for a Hudson's Bay Company employee, a French Canadian named Gilbert, said to have drowned in the river. Gilbert was a trapper during the fur-trading era.

== See also ==
- List of rivers of Oregon
