= Scappoose Industrial Airpark =

Airport in Oregon, United States

Scappoose Airport
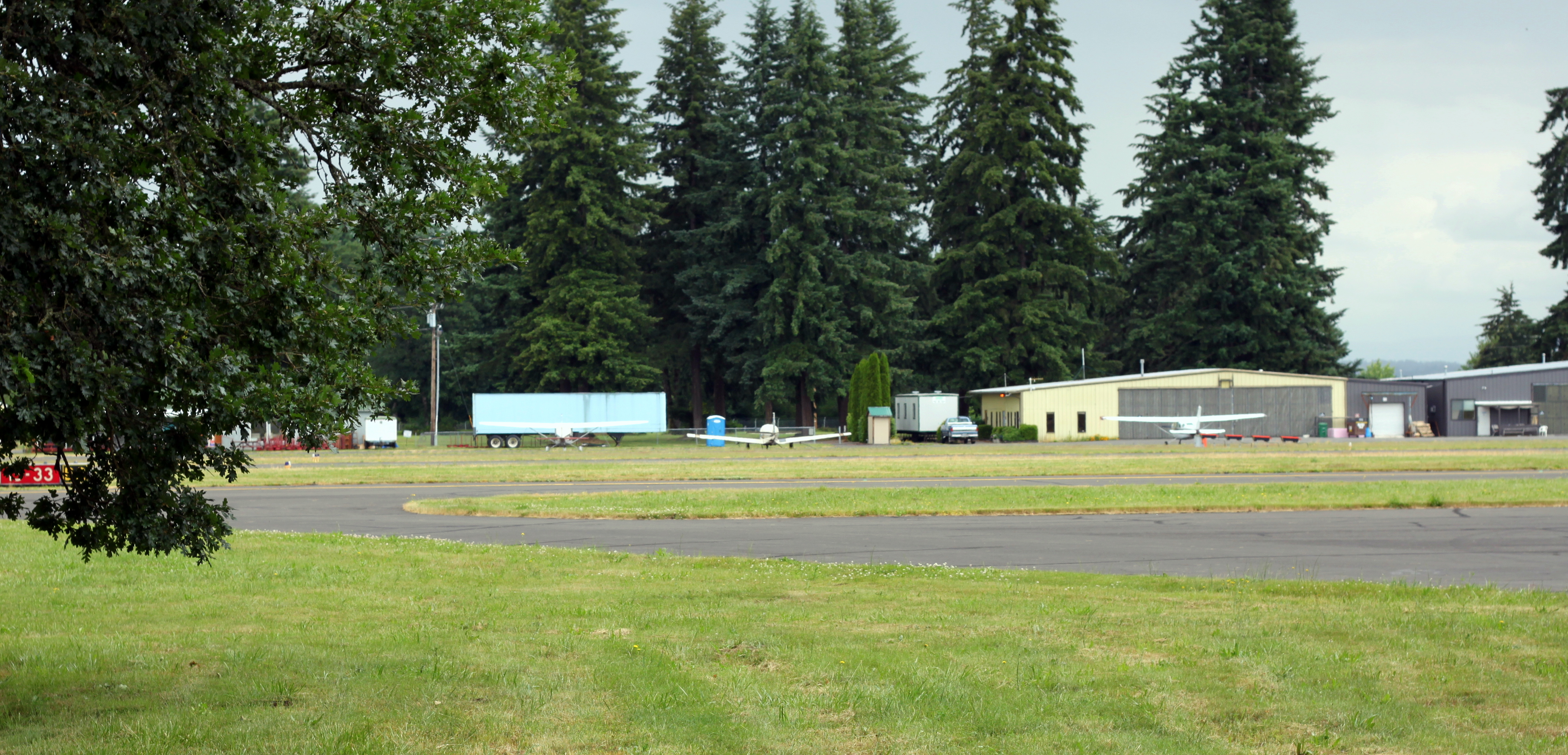
- Hangars, planes, and runway
- IATA: none; ICAO: KSPB; FAA LID: SPB

Summary
- Airport type: Public
- Owner/Operator: Port of Columbia County
- Serves: Scappoose, Oregon
- Elevation AMSL: 58 ft (18 m)
- Coordinates: 45°46′16″N 122°51′43″W
- Website: www.portofcolumbiacounty.org/1237/Scappoose-Airport
- Interactive map of Scappoose Airport

Runways
Direction	Length		Surface
Direction	ft	m	Surface
15/33	5,100	1,554	Asphalt

Statistics (2021)
- Aircraft operations (year ending 9/27/2021): 60,000
- Based aircraft: 122
- Source: Federal Aviation Administration

Scappoose Airport (ICAO: KSPB, FAA LID: SPB, formerly 1S4) (Note: Although many U.S. airports use the same three-letter location identifier for the FAA and IATA, this airport is assigned SPB by the FAA but has no designation from the IATA (which assigned SPB to Charlotte Amalie Harbor Seaplane Base in Charlotte Amalie, Saint Thomas, U.S. Virgin Islands).) is a public use airport located one nautical mile (1.85 km) northeast of the central business district of Scappoose, in Columbia County, Oregon, United States. It is owned and operated by the Port of Columbia County, an Oregon port district and municipal corporation, on behalf of district residents. According to the Federal Aviation Administration's National Plan of Integrated Airport Systems for 2009–2013, it is categorized as a general aviation airport.

Several privately held firms in the general aviation manufacturing industry are headquartered at the Scappoose Airport.

== Facilities and aircraft ==
Scappoose Airport covers an area of 196 acres (79 ha) at an elevation of 58 feet (18 m) above mean sea level. It has one runway designated 15/33 with an asphalt surface measuring 5,100 by 100 feet (1,554 x 30 m).

For the 12-month period ending September 27, 2021, the airport had 60,000 aircraft operations, an average of 164 per day: 95% general aviation, 4% air taxi, and 1% military. At that time there were 122 aircraft based at this airport: 110 single-engine, 3 multi-engine, 7 helicopter and 2 glider.
