= Milton Creek =

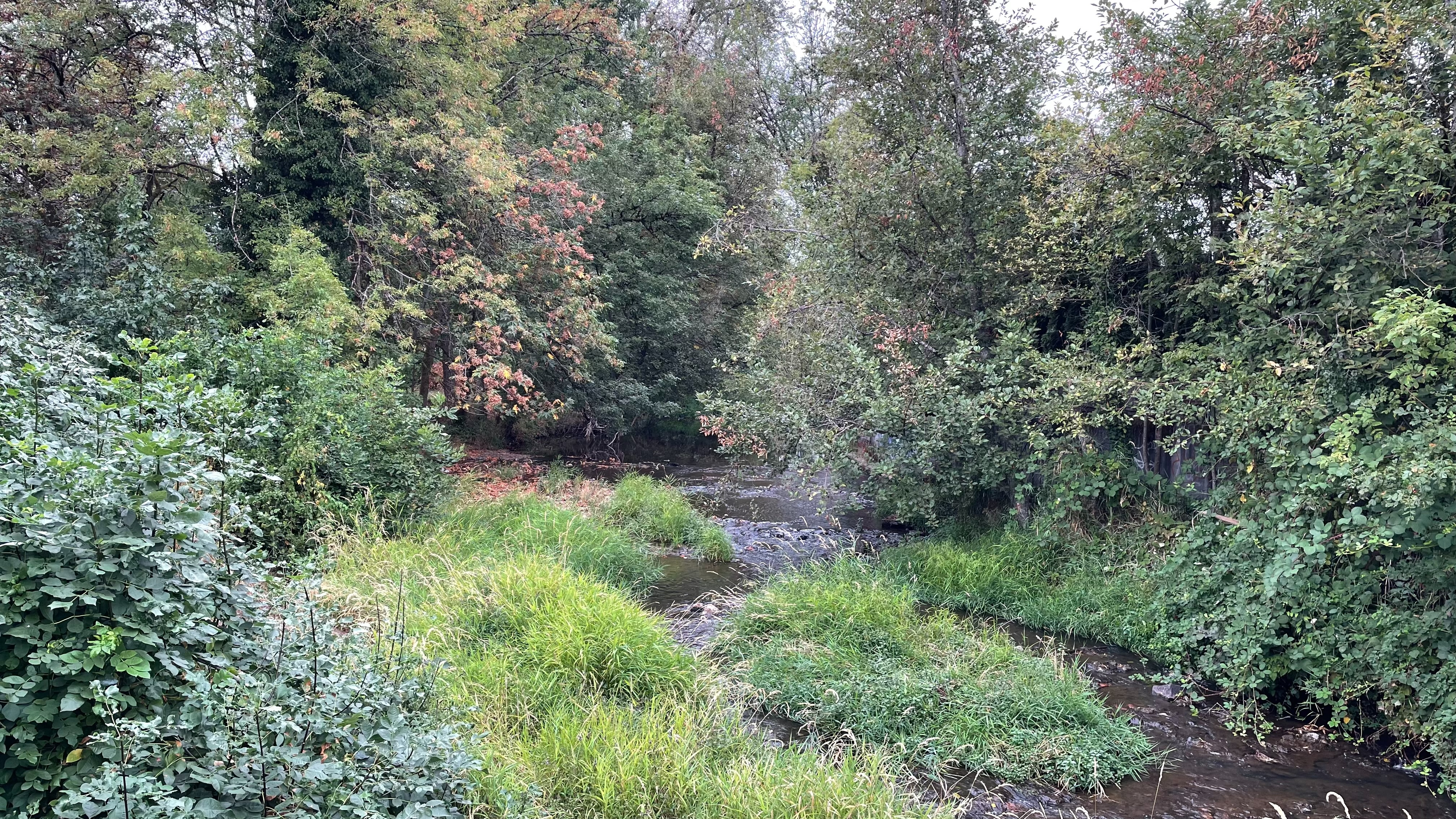
- Milton Creek as seen from US 30 in St. Helens, Oregon.

- Location of the mouth of Milton Creek in Oregon

Location
- Country: United States
- State: Oregon
- Cities: St. Helens

Physical characteristics
- Source
  - location: Rural Columbia County, Oregon, United States
  - coordinates: 45°52′30″N 122°58′19″W
  - elevation: 1,260 ft (380 m)
- Mouth: Multnomah Channel
  - location: St. Helens, Oregon
  - coordinates: 45°50′19″N 122°48′47″W
  - elevation: 3 ft (0.91 m)
- Length: 28.5 mi (45.9 km)
- Basin size: 32.16 sq mi (83.3 km^{2})

Milton Creek, is a waterway in Columbia County, Oregon, United States. It is 28.5 miles (45.9 km) long, rising in the Oregon Coast Range and emptying into Scappoose Bay – a slough of Multnomah Channel – one of the distributaries of the Willamette River where it enters the Columbia River. The creek was named for a small settlement that was founded at the mouth of the creek in 1846, but later became Houlton because there was already a post office in Oregon with the name Milton (Milton-Freewater). Houlton was later absorbed into St. Helens.

The creek is home to several fish species, including steelhead trout, cutthroat trout, and coho salmon. Much of the undeveloped portion of the watershed is heavily forested. The upper reaches of Milton Creek receive around 60 inches (1,500 mm) of precipitation a year, while the lower elevations closer to the Columbia River see closer to 50 inches (1,300 mm).

Portions of Milton Creek have been significantly altered since permanent settlement came to the region for both farming and transporting logs. The lower 2 miles (3.2 km) originally flowed into the Columbia River through Jackass Canyon to the north of the courthouse in St. Helens but was relocated to its present path in 1861. Scappoose Bay and Multnomah Channel was later lined with levees to protect from flooding. The Scappoose Bay Watershed Council has undertaken several restoration projects along the creek and other Scappoose Bay tributaries since 2001.
