= Sauvie Island =

Island in the state of Oregon

Native name: Wapato Island
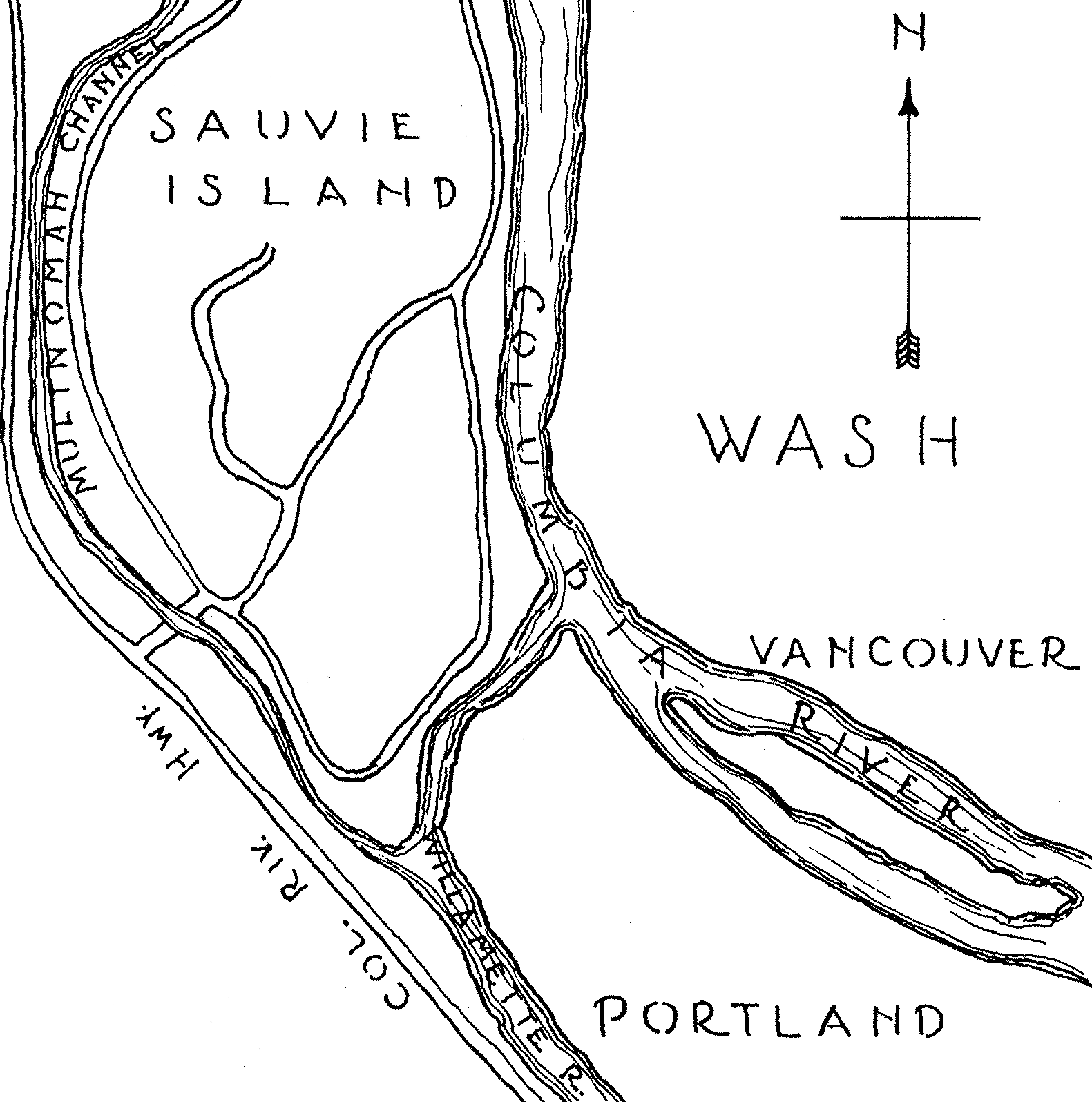
- Map of Sauvie Island

- Location within Oregon

Geography
- Location: Columbia River
- Coordinates: 45.7°N 122.8°W
- Area: 32.75 sq mi (84.8 km^{2})

Administration
- United States
- State: Oregon

Demographics
- Population: 1,078 (2000)

Sauvie Island is in the U.S. state of Oregon, originally named as Wapato Island or Wappatoo Island. It is the largest island along the Columbia River, at 24,000 acres (9,712 ha), and one of the largest river islands in the United States. It lies approximately 10 miles (16 km) northwest of downtown Portland, between the Columbia River to the east, the Multnomah Channel to the west, and the Willamette River to the south. A large portion of the island is designated as the Sauvie Island Wildlife Area. Sturgeon Lake, in the north central part of the island, is the most prominent water feature. The land area is 39.25 square miles (101.7 km^{2}), or 25,120 acres (10,170 ha). Most of the island is in Multnomah County, but the northern third is in Columbia County. The Wapato Bridge provides access across the Multnomah Channel from U.S. Route 30 and was completed in June 2008, replacing the first bridge to connect the island to the mainland which was opened on December 30, 1950.

The island received the name "Sauvés Island" after Laurent Sauvé dit Laplante, a French-Canadian who managed a dairy for the Hudson's Bay Company in the 1830s and 1840s. It is predominantly farmland and wildlife refuge and is a popular place for picking pumpkins, hunting geese and kayaking. There were 1,078 year-round residents at the 2000 census. There is a small convenience store in the southeast corner, near the bridge. Bicyclists flock to the island because its flat topography and lengthy low-volume roads make it ideal for cycling. Its nearest incorporated neighbors are the Portland-Vancouver metropolitan area to its south and southeast; St. Helens across the Multnomah Channel from the extreme northern tip of the island; and Scappoose, across the Multnomah Channel to the west.

== History ==
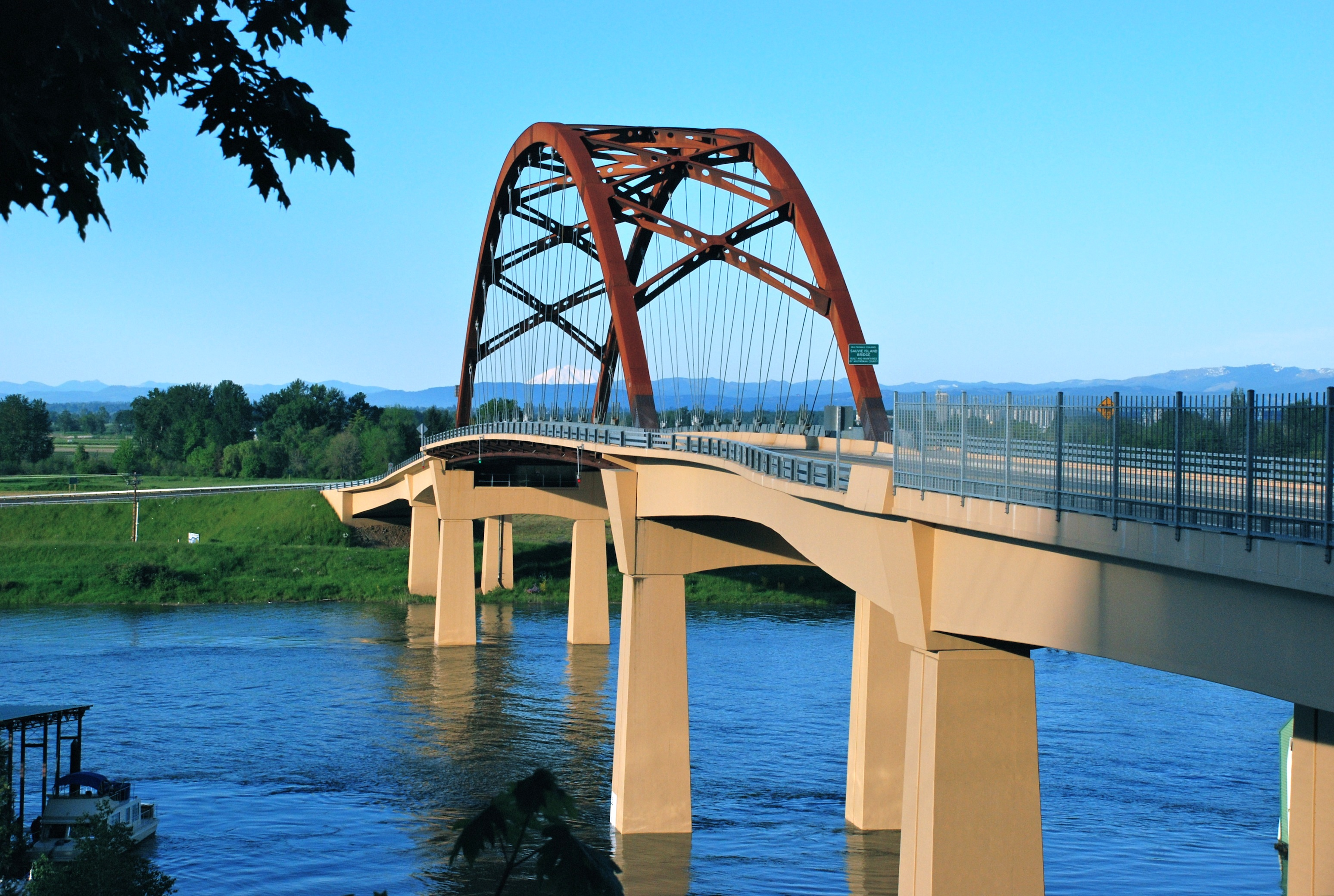
Wapato Bridge connects the island to the rest of Oregon.

Prior to European arrival in the 19th century, Sauvie Island was the ancestral home to the Multnomah band of the Chinook Tribe. There were approximately 15 villages on the island, hosting a total of 2,000 people who built and resided in cedar plank-houses 30 yards (27 m) long by 12 yards (11 m) wide.

- 1792 – British Lieutenant William Broughton in George Vancouver's expedition explores the island and names the northern tip "Warrior Point" after being greeted offshore by 23 canoes of armed Multnomah.
- October 29 – Mount Hood was named on October 29, 1792, as Lt. Broughton observed its peak from Belle Vue Point at the southern tip of Sauvie Island during his travels up the Columbia River, writing: A very high, snowy mountain now appeared rising beautifully conspicuous in the midst of an extensive tract of low or moderately elevated land (location of today's Vancouver, Washington) lying S 67 E., and seemed to announce a termination to the river. Lt. Broughton named the mountain after British admiral Samuel Hood.
- November 4, 1805 – The Lewis and Clark expedition lands, names it "Wapato Island" after the abundance of Broadleaf arrowhead plants, which are also known as "Indian potato" and were a major foodstuff for indigenous peoples in the Pacific Northwest.
- During the next decades the natives weather outbreaks of smallpox, syphilis, measles and tuberculosis.
- 1829 - A horrifying epidemic of a fever known as the ague (malaria) sweeps across the land.
- 1832 - So much of the native population has died in the epidemic, they are nearly extinct; Dr. McLoughlin of the Hudson's Bay Company removes survivors and burns settlements.
- 1834 – American Nathaniel Jarvis Wyeth builds and occupies Fort William, a small trading post, to compete with the British; abandoned 1836.
- c. 1836 – Hudson's Bay Company establishes dairies on the island, managed by French-Canadian employee Laurent Sauvé (after whom the island is now named).
- 1843 – The opening of the Oregon Trail makes it possible for American settlers to come to the island from the Midwest.
- 1851 – Mouth of Willamette post office is established; renamed Souvies Island the following year.
- 1858 – James Francis Bybee builds Bybee–Howell House. The structure was added to the NRHP in 1974, and is part of Howell Territorial Park.

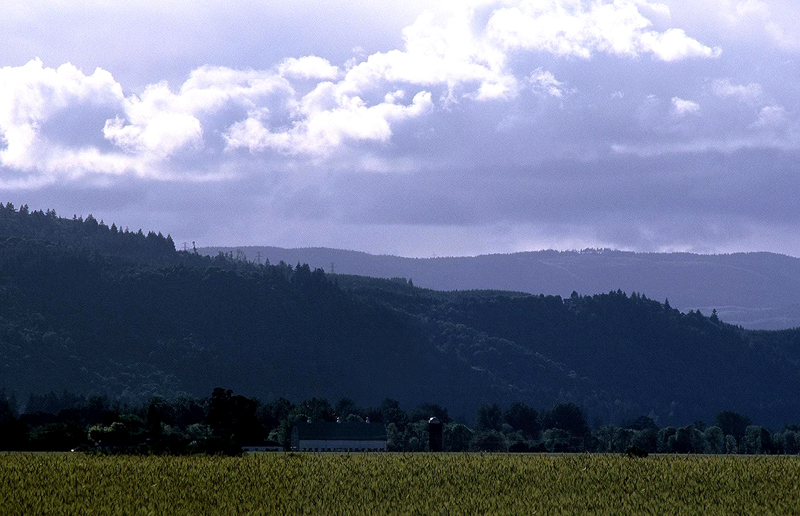
Looking west across the fields from Gillihan Road

- 1889 – Warrior Rock Lighthouse established at Warrior Point.
- 1920s – during prohibition, cargo ships from Canada would offload liquor to motorboats in international waters off the Columbia River. The motorboats ran back up the river to Sauvie Island, meeting bootleggers there.
- 1930s – The Army Corps of Engineers builds flood-control dikes.
- 1940s – Sauvie Island Wildlife Area acquired by the state of Oregon.
- November 29, 1943 – Sauvie Island Conservation District is formed by unanimous vote.
- December 30, 1950 – Sauvie Island Bridge opens; Sauvie Island Ferry, the last ferry in the Portland metropolitan area, closes.
- 2006 – Multnomah County begins construction of new Sauvie Island Bridge.
- 2008 – New Sauvie Island Bridge opens with a parade and a performance by the Oregon Crusaders Drum and Bugle Corps.
- 2022 – Multnomah County Board of Commissioners rename Sauvie Island Bridge to Wapato Bridge.

== Recreational beaches ==
Not all of the island's beaches have public beach access. The public beaches on Sauvie Island are Walton Beach, North Unit Beach, and the clothing-optional Collins Beach on the island's east coast along NW Reeder Road's last few miles past the end of the pavement. The beaches are open from dawn to 10:00 p.m., and are closed to overnight use and camping. Open fires are not allowed. Dogs are allowed if they are leashed. This section of the beach is often a party-like environment on warm and sunny days, leading to an alcohol ban in effect from May 1 to September 30 that began in 2018. Beach parking requires a Sauvie Island Wildlife Area parking permit available at stores on the island. Vehicles without a permit are subject to a ticket costing around $75.

== Farms ==
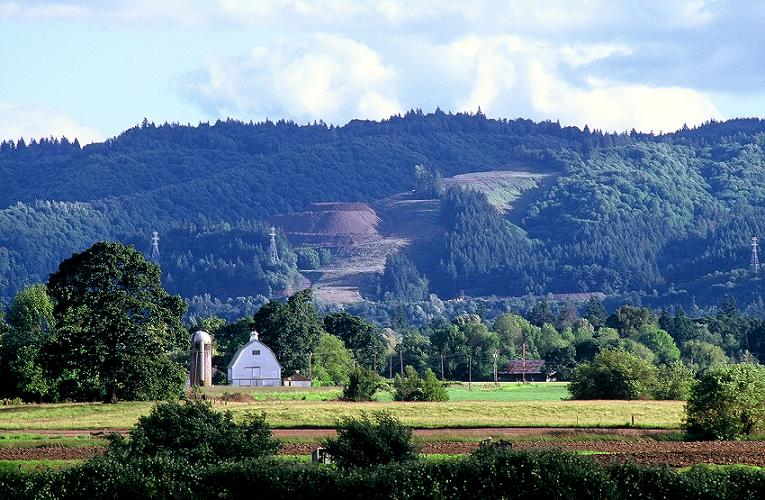
Farmland on Sauvie Island in early summer

Sauvie Island is home to dozens of private farms, from nurseries and gardens, to about a dozen fruit and vegetable farms open for public U-picking. Crops include strawberries, raspberries, marionberries, blackberries, blueberries, peaches, pears, sweet corn, cherries, broccoli, lettuce, cauliflower, zucchini, tomatoes, green beans, cucumbers, pumpkins, herbs, and others. Many of these farms also offer activities such as hay rides, cow trains, pumpkin patches, and mazes.

== See also ==
- Sauvie Island UFO
