= Sturgeon Lake (Oregon) =

Body of water in Oregon, U.S.

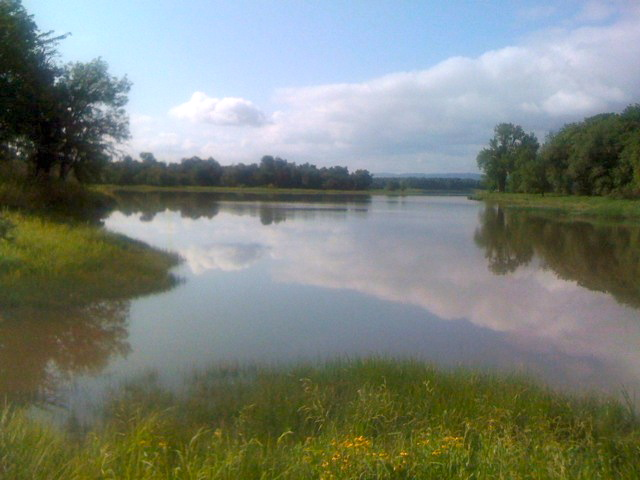
- Sturgeon Lake

- Location within Oregon Location within the United States
- Location: Oregon
- Coordinates: 45.725716°N 122.79007°W
- Type: Lake
- Etymology: Sturgeon
- Part of: Columbia River Basin

Sturgeon Lake is a lake on Sauvie Island in the U.S. state of Oregon. Named for its historical population of sturgeon, it is the largest lake on what is one of the largest river islands in the United States, occupying 3,000 acres normally and expanding to up to 7,000 acres during the Columbia River's flood stage. Located within the Sauvie Island Wildlife Area, the lake is a critical habitat within the Pacific Flyway for migratory waterfowl, hosting over 200,000 birds annually. It is also an important feeding and resting place for young salmonids along their migration routes.

In the 21st century, the lake has had a number of environmental problems. The most prominent of these problems is sedimentation, meaning that the lake is filling in with silt, sand, and debris. Its only remaining inflows and outflows are the Gilbert River and Dairy Creek, the latter of which is significantly reduced in flow. The lake has also sometimes been closed due to toxic algae blooms. Starting in 2018, a restoration project returned some of the previous Dairy Creek flow.

== See also ==
- List of lakes of Oregon
