= St. Helens, Oregon =

City in and county seat of Columbia County, Oregon

- City
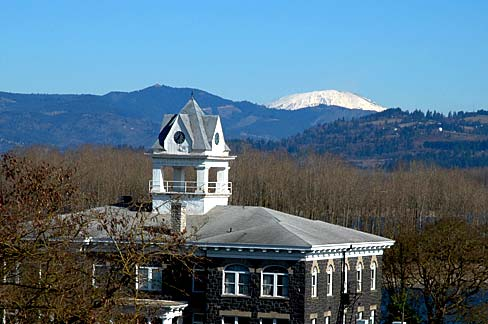
- The Columbia County Courthouse with Mount St. Helens in the background

- Seal

- Location in Oregon
- Coordinates: 45°51′34″N 122°48′50″W
- Country: United States
- State: Oregon
- County: Columbia
- Incorporated: 1889

Government
  - Type: Mayor-council government
  - Mayor: Jennifer Massey

Area
  - Total: 5.95 sq mi (15.41 km^{2})
  - Land: 4.83 sq mi (12.51 km^{2})
  - Water: 1.12 sq mi (2.90 km^{2})
- Elevation: 89 ft (27 m)

Population (2020)
  - Total: 13,817
  - Density: 2,860.2/sq mi (1,104.33/km^{2})
- Time zone: UTC−8 (Pacific)
  - Summer (DST): UTC−7 (Pacific)
- Zip Code: 97051
- FIPS code: 41-64600
- GNIS feature ID: 2411759
- Website: https://www.sthelensoregon.gov

St. Helens is a city in and the county seat of Columbia County, Oregon. It was founded by Captain Henry Montgomery Knighton, a native of New England, in 1845, as "Plymouth". The name was changed to St. Helens in the latter part of 1850 for its view of Mount St. Helens, roughly 39 miles (63 km) away in Washington. The city is about 28 miles (45 km) northwest of Portland. As of the 2020 census, St. Helens had a population of 13,817.

== History ==
The Lewis and Clark Expedition passed through and camped in the area that is now St. Helens on the night of November 5, 1805, while on their way to the Pacific Ocean. While there, the party encountered Native Americans and Clark observed "low rockey clifts".

St. Helens was established as a river port on the Columbia River in the 1840s. The original town was surveyed and platted by Scottish-born Peter Crawford. In 1853, the Pacific Mail Steamship Company tried to make the city their only stop on the Columbia River. Portland's merchants boycotted this effort, and the San Francisco steamship Peytona helped break the impasse. St. Helens was incorporated as a city in 1889. St. Helens and the adjacent town of Houlton merged in 1914. Houlton is now a part of the West St. Helens neighborhood.

== Geography ==
U.S. Route 30 passes through the city. It is located along the west bank of the Columbia River north of where Multnomah Channel enters it. Milton Creek flows through the town, entering Multnomah Channel via Scappoose Bay.

According to the United States Census Bureau, the city has a total area of 5.51 square miles (14.27 km^{2}), of which 4.53 square miles (11.73 km^{2}) is land and 0.98 square miles (2.54 km^{2}) is covered by water.

== Climate ==
According to the Köppen climate classification system, St. Helens has a warm-summer Mediterranean climate (Csb).

Climate data for St. Helens, Oregon
| Month | Jan | Feb | Mar | Apr | May | Jun | Jul | Aug | Sep | Oct | Nov | Dec | Year |
|---|---|---|---|---|---|---|---|---|---|---|---|---|---|
| Record high °F (°C) | 63 (17) | 71 (22) | 82 (28) | 90 (32) | 102 (39) | 117 (47) | 106 (41) | 107 (42) | 106 (41) | 94 (34) | 72 (22) | 62 (17) | 117 (47) |
| Mean daily maximum °F (°C) | 46.5 (8.1) | 50.5 (10.3) | 55.4 (13.0) | 60.7 (15.9) | 67.8 (19.9) | 72.6 (22.6) | 80.4 (26.9) | 81.6 (27.6) | 75.7 (24.3) | 63.4 (17.4) | 52.4 (11.3) | 45.7 (7.6) | 62.7 (17.1) |
| Daily mean °F (°C) | 40.6 (4.8) | 42.6 (5.9) | 46.5 (8.1) | 50.7 (10.4) | 57.1 (13.9) | 61.5 (16.4) | 67.6 (19.8) | 68.2 (20.1) | 62.9 (17.2) | 53.5 (11.9) | 45.4 (7.4) | 40.2 (4.6) | 53.0 (11.7) |
| Mean daily minimum °F (°C) | 34.7 (1.5) | 34.7 (1.5) | 37.5 (3.1) | 40.6 (4.8) | 46.3 (7.9) | 50.4 (10.2) | 54.8 (12.7) | 54.7 (12.6) | 50.1 (10.1) | 43.5 (6.4) | 38.3 (3.5) | 34.6 (1.4) | 43.3 (6.3) |
| Record low °F (°C) | 9 (−13) | 4 (−16) | 18 (−8) | 20 (−7) | 21 (−6) | 34 (1) | 38 (3) | 30 (−1) | 34 (1) | 20 (−7) | 10 (−12) | 1 (−17) | 1 (−17) |
| Average precipitation inches (mm) | 6.33 (161) | 4.76 (121) | 4.76 (121) | 3.81 (97) | 2.77 (70) | 1.85 (47) | 0.39 (9.9) | 0.78 (20) | 1.84 (47) | 3.94 (100) | 6.68 (170) | 7.56 (192) | 45.45 (1,154) |
| Average snowfall inches (cm) | 1.3 (3.3) | 0.4 (1.0) | 0 (0) | 0 (0) | 0 (0) | 0 (0) | 0 (0) | 0 (0) | 0 (0) | 0 (0) | 0.4 (1.0) | 0.8 (2.0) | 3 (7.6) |
| Average precipitation days | 18 | 15 | 17 | 15 | 12 | 9 | 4 | 5 | 7 | 12 | 18 | 18 | 150 |
Source 1: Temperature and precipitation averages
Source 2: Record highs, lows, and snowfall averages, June 2021 record high

=== Neighborhoods ===
Columbia Heights is a formerly separate populated place that is within the city limits of St. Helens.

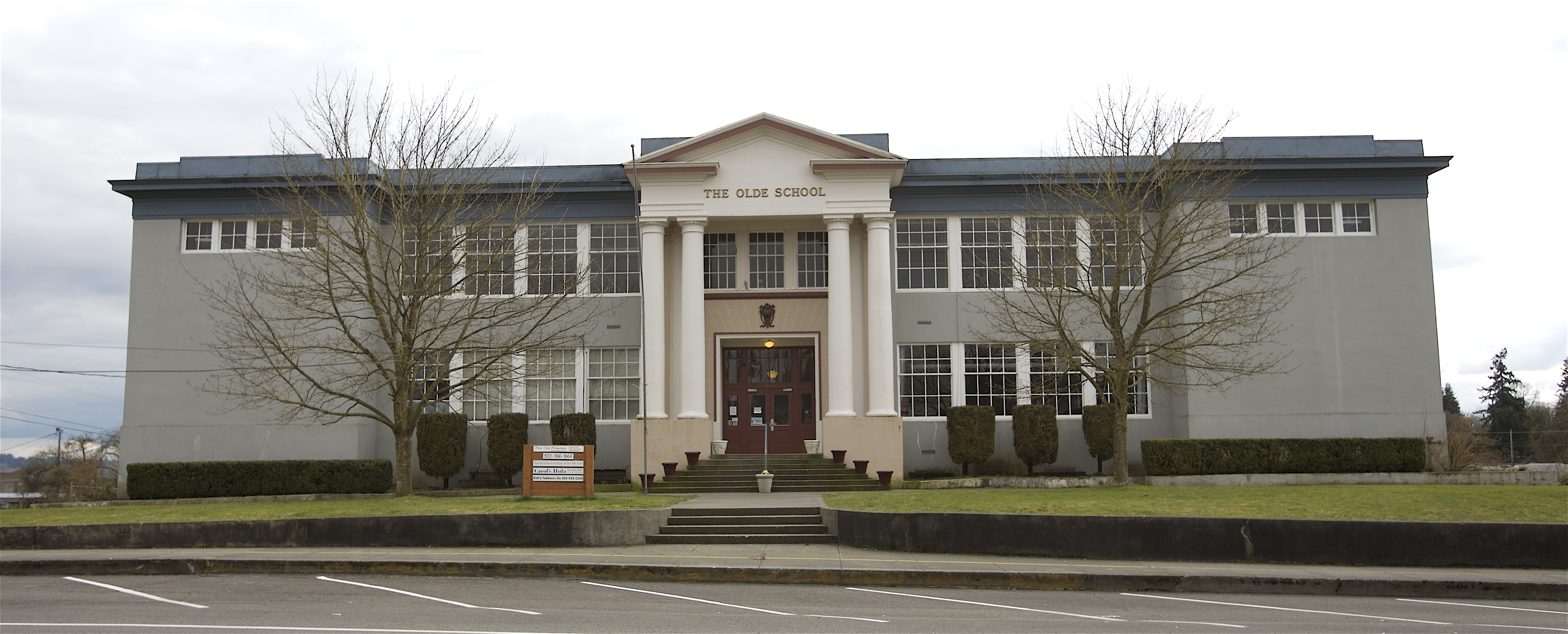
The Olde School in St. Helens

== Demographics ==
=== 2020 census ===
As of the 2020 census, St. Helens had a population of 13,817. The median age was 38.3 years. 22.6% of residents were under the age of 18 and 14.7% of residents were 65 years of age or older. For every 100 females there were 97.6 males, and for every 100 females age 18 and over there were 96.9 males age 18 and over.

99.4% of residents lived in urban areas, while 0.6% lived in rural areas.

There were 5,302 households in St. Helens, of which 32.5% had children under the age of 18 living in them. Of all households, 43.9% were married-couple households, 19.3% were households with a male householder and no spouse or partner present, and 27.3% were households with a female householder and no spouse or partner present. About 26.4% of all households were made up of individuals and 11.5% had someone living alone who was 65 years of age or older.

There were 5,636 housing units, of which 5.9% were vacant. Among occupied housing units, 62.1% were owner-occupied and 37.9% were renter-occupied. The homeowner vacancy rate was 1.5% and the rental vacancy rate was 5.8%.

Racial composition as of the 2020 census
| Race | Number | Percent |
|---|---|---|
| White | 11,579 | 83.8% |
| Black or African American | 116 | 0.8% |
| American Indian and Alaska Native | 204 | 1.5% |
| Asian | 166 | 1.2% |
| Native Hawaiian and Other Pacific Islander | 41 | 0.3% |
| Some other race | 384 | 2.8% |
| Two or more races | 1,327 | 9.6% |
| Hispanic or Latino (of any race) | 1,031 | 7.5% |

Historical population
| Census | Pop. | Note | %± |
|---|---|---|---|
| 1880 | 209 | | — |
| 1890 | 220 | | 5.3% |
| 1900 | 258 | | 17.3% |
| 1910 | 743 | | 188.0% |
| 1920 | 2,220 | | 198.8% |
| 1930 | 3,994 | | 79.9% |
| 1940 | 4,304 | | 7.8% |
| 1950 | 4,711 | | 9.5% |
| 1960 | 5,022 | | 6.6% |
| 1970 | 6,212 | | 23.7% |
| 1980 | 7,064 | | 13.7% |
| 1990 | 7,535 | | 6.7% |
| 2000 | 10,019 | | 33.0% |
| 2010 | 12,883 | | 28.6% |
| 2020 | 13,817 | | 7.2% |

=== 2010 census ===
As of the census of 2010, there were 12,883 people, 4,847 households, and 3,243 families residing in the city. The population density was 2,843.9 inhabitants per square mile (1,098.0/km^{2}). There were 5,154 housing units at an average density of 1,137.7 per square mile (439.3/km^{2}). The racial makeup of the city was 90.3% White, 0.6% African American, 1.6% Native American, 1.3% Asian, 0.3% Pacific Islander, 1.3% from other races, and 4.5% from two or more races. Hispanic or Latino of any race were 6.1% of the population.

There were 4,847 households, of which 38.6% had children under the age of 18 living with them, 46.5% were married couples living together, 14.3% had a female householder with no husband present, 6.1% had a male householder with no wife present, and 33.1% were non-families. 26.1% of all households were made up of individuals, and 9.9% had someone living alone who was 65 years of age or older. The average household size was 2.59 and the average family size was 3.11.

The median age in the city was 34 years. 27.6% of residents were under the age of 18; 9% were between the ages of 18 and 24; 29.9% were from 25 to 44; 23.3% were from 45 to 64; and 10.2% were 65 years of age or older. The gender makeup of the city was 49.8% male and 50.2% female.

=== 2000 census ===
As of the census of 2000, there were 10,019 people, 3,722 households, and 2,579 families residing in the city. The population density was 2,305.6 inhabitants per square mile (890.2/km^{2}). There were 4,032 housing units at an average density of 927.8 per square mile (358.2/km^{2}). The racial makeup of the city was 92.74% White, 0.34% African American, 1.68% Native American, 0.63% Asian, 0.15% Pacific Islander, 1.35% from other races, and 3.11% from two or more races. Hispanic or Latino of any race were 4.05% of the population. 21.5% were of German, 10.9% English, 9.5% Irish and 9.3% American ancestry according to Census 2000.

There were 3,722 households, out of which 39.3% had children under the age of 18 living with them, 51.5% were married couples living together, 12.6% had a female householder with no husband present, and 30.7% were non-families. 24.2% of all households were made up of individuals, and 7.9% had someone living alone who was 65 years of age or older. The average household size was 2.65 and the average family size was 3.12.

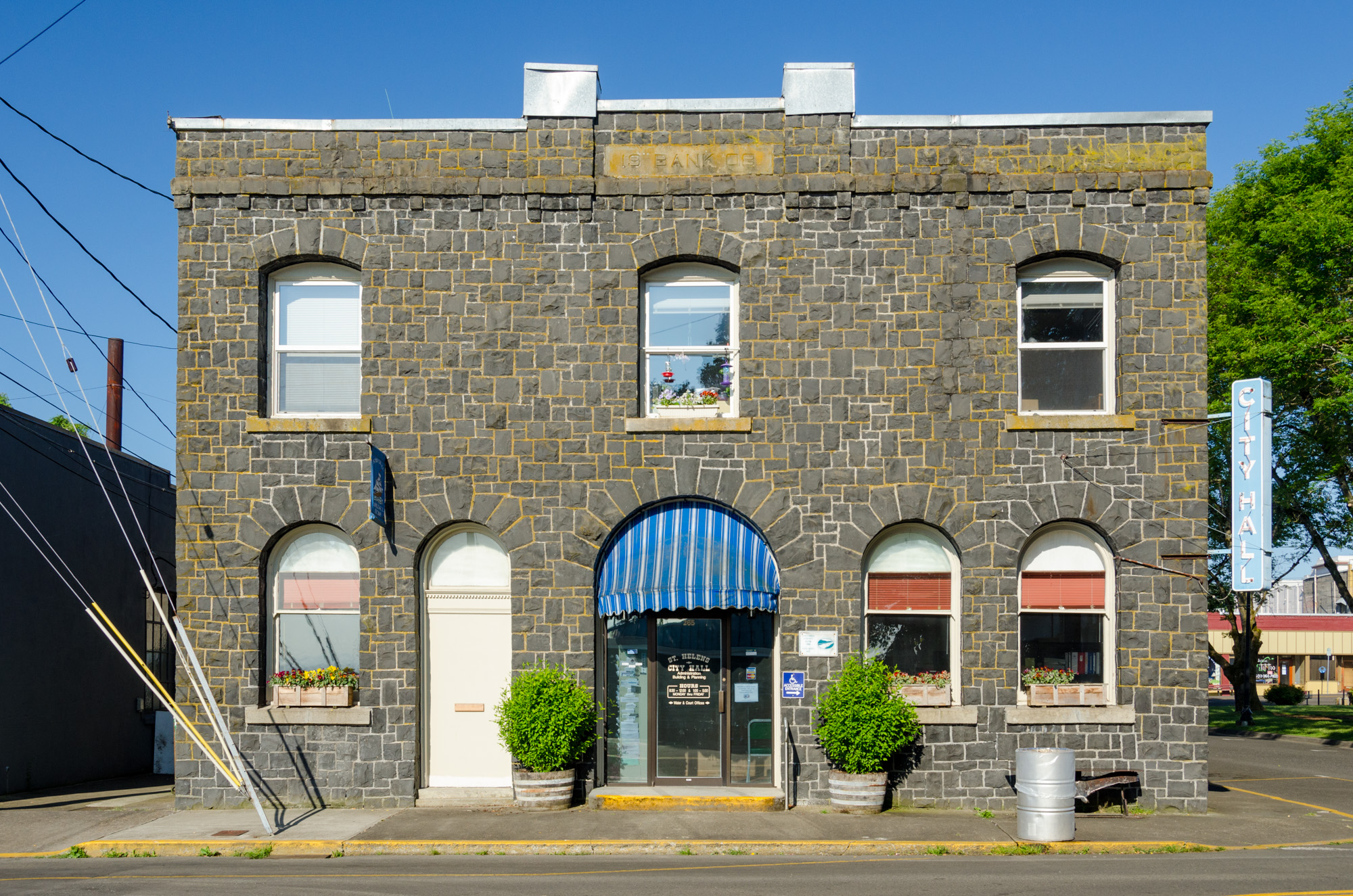
St. Helens City Hall

In the city, the population was spread out, with 30.2% under the age of 18, 9.0% from 18 to 24, 31.7% from 25 to 44, 19.6% from 45 to 64, and 9.6% who were 65 years of age or older. The median age was 32 years. For every 100 females, there were 98.9 males. For every 100 females age 18 and over, there were 96.2 males.

The median income for a household in the city was $40,648, and the median income for a family was $45,548. Males had a median income of $39,375 versus $26,725 for females. The per capita income for the city was $17,237. About 8.7% of families and 11.9% of the population were below the poverty line, including 16.5% of those under age 18 and 4.6% of those age 65 or over.

== Tourism ==
In October, the town embraces the Halloween spirit with a month-long celebration of spooky events and decorations geared toward entertaining crowds of families. The Riverfront District in St. Helens, Oregon served as the backdrop for the 1998 Disney Channel Original Movie Halloweentown. The film adaptation of Stephenie Meyer's novel Twilight also filmed in the town.

== Education ==
St. Helens is within the St. Helens School District.

== Media ==
Until ceasing publication in 2024, The Chronicle was a weekly newspaper covering St. Helens and published since 1881.

KOHI (AM) is St. Helens' local AM radio station.

== Notable people ==
- Robert Cornthwaite, actor
- Holly Madison, Playboy model, reality TV personality on The Girls Next Door and Holly's World
- Rob Mallicoat, baseball player
- David Mayo, American football player
- Frank A. Moore, Chief Justice of Oregon Supreme Court
- Katee Sackhoff, actress
- Chris Wakeland, baseball player

== Sister city ==
St. Helens has one sister city:

- Bowral, New South Wales, Australia

== See also ==
- Nob Hill Nature Park
- Port of St. Helens
