= Crib =

Crib may refer to:

== Structures ==
- Bach (New Zealand), a type of modest beach house, called a crib in the southern half of the South Island e.g. Otago and Southland
- Box crib, a wooden frame used to stabilise a heavy object during a rescue, jacking, construction, or moving operation
- Corn crib, a granary for drying and storing corn
- Crib barn, a type of barn once commonly found throughout the U.S. south and southeast regions
- Crib bridge, a bridge built of logs or stones stacked like log cabins
- Crib dam (or timber crib dam), a dam built with heavy timbers in the manner of a log house
- Crib lighthouse, a type of lighthouse whose structure rests on a concrete or masonry foundation supported with wooden beams
- Crib pier, a type of pier built with supporting columns constructed like log cabins
- Crib wall, a gravity type retaining wall built of precast concrete slabs
- Water crib, an offshore structure that supplies water to an onshore pumping station

== Furniture ==
- Crib, an American English term for an infant bed
- Manger, a trough or box to hold food for animals

== Other uses ==
- Ciani Crib, a single seat, high performance glider
- Crib, a mid-morning break for a snack, in Cornish dialect
- Crib, alternate term for a nativity scene, a depiction of the birth of Jesus as described in the gospels of Matthew and Luke
- Crib (cryptanalysis), a sample of known plaintext in codebreaking
- Crib Goch, a knife-edged arête in Gwynedd, Wales
- Crib sheet, a concise set of notes for quick reference—see cheat sheet
- Cribbage, a card game
- Cribbing (horse), a bad habit of some horses

== See also ==
- Cribs (disambiguation)
- Crip (disambiguation)
