= Crip =

Crip may refer to:

== People ==
- Crip Toomey (1895–1961), American football and baseball player and coach
- Henry "Crip" Heard (1923–1991), African-American dancer

== Science ==
- CRIP1, the human gene for cysteine-rich protein 1
- CRIP2, the human gene for cysteine-rich protein 2

== Other uses ==
- Chicago, Rock Island and Pacific Railroad, United States
- Crip (disability term), reclaimed slang for cripple
- Crip theory, a branch of disability studies
- CRIP (Clave de Registro e Identidad Personal), a registration and identification code used in Mexico
- Crips, an American street gang organization, whose members are organized within crip gangs named crip sets
- Crank Reference index Position (CRiP), an important measurement taken by crankshaft position sensors.
