= Deer Island, Oregon =

Unincorporated community in the state of Oregon, United States

- Census-designated place
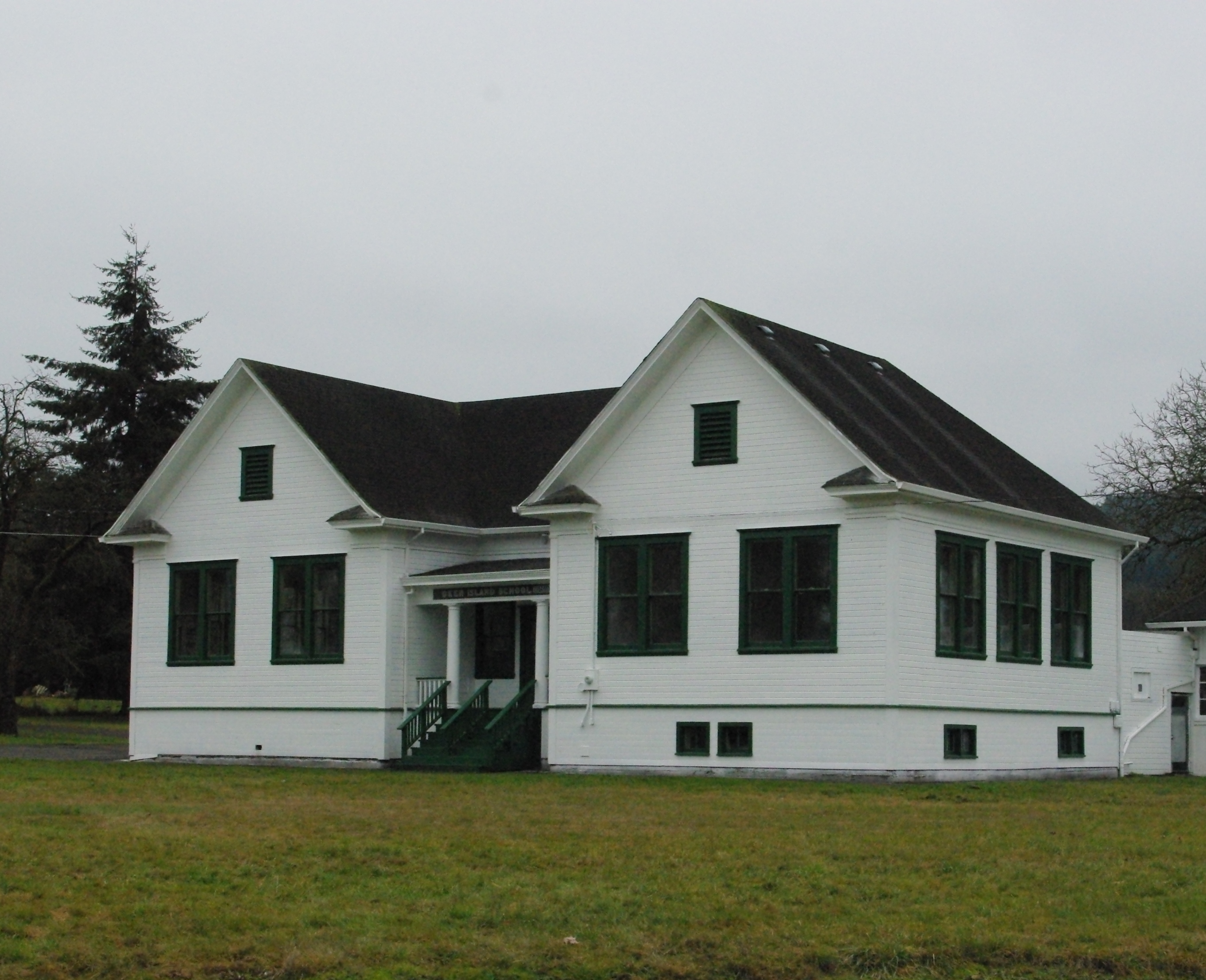
- Former Deer Island School

- Location within Oregon Location within the United States
- Coordinates: 45°55′59″N 122°50′59″W
- Country: United States
- State: Oregon
- County: Columbia

Area
  - Total: 0.49 sq mi (1.26 km^{2})
  - Land: 0.49 sq mi (1.26 km^{2})
  - Water: 0 sq mi (0.00 km^{2})
- Elevation: 26 ft (7.9 m)

Population (2020)
  - Total: 323
  - Density: 661.8/sq mi (255.52/km^{2})
- Time zone: UTC-8 (Pacific (PST))
  - Summer (DST): UTC-7 (PDT)
- Area codes: 503 & 971
- GNIS feature ID: 2611727

Deer Island is an unincorporated community and census-designated place in Columbia County, Oregon, United States. As of the 2020 census, Deer Island had a population of 323.

The community is located along U.S. Route 30 north-northwest of Columbia City. Deer Island has a post office with ZIP code 97054.

== Demographics ==
Historical population
Census	Pop.	Note	%±
2010	294		—
2020	323		9.9%
U.S. Decennial Census

As of the 2020 census, there were 323 people, 143 housing units, and 93 families in the CDP. In Deer Island there were, 282 White people, 0 African Americans, 10 Native Americans, 2 Asians, 0 Pacific Islanders, 6 people that were from some other race, and 23 from two or more races. 30 people were from Hispanic or Latino origin.

The ancestry of Deer Island is 21.8% German, 13.8% Irish, 11.5% French, 2.9% Italian, and 2.9% Norwegian.

The median age in Deer Island was 52.4 years old. 29.3% of the population were over 65, with 22.4% from 65 to 74, and 6.9% from 75 to 84. 0.0% of the population were foreign born.

The median household income was $23,750, with families having $37,500, and non-families having $18,750. 5.2% of the population were in poverty, and 9.9% of people 18 to 64 were in poverty.

== Education ==
It is in the St. Helens School District.
