= Columbia and Nehalem Valley Railroad =

Railroad in Oregon, United States

Coordinates: 45.895000°N 122.810669°W

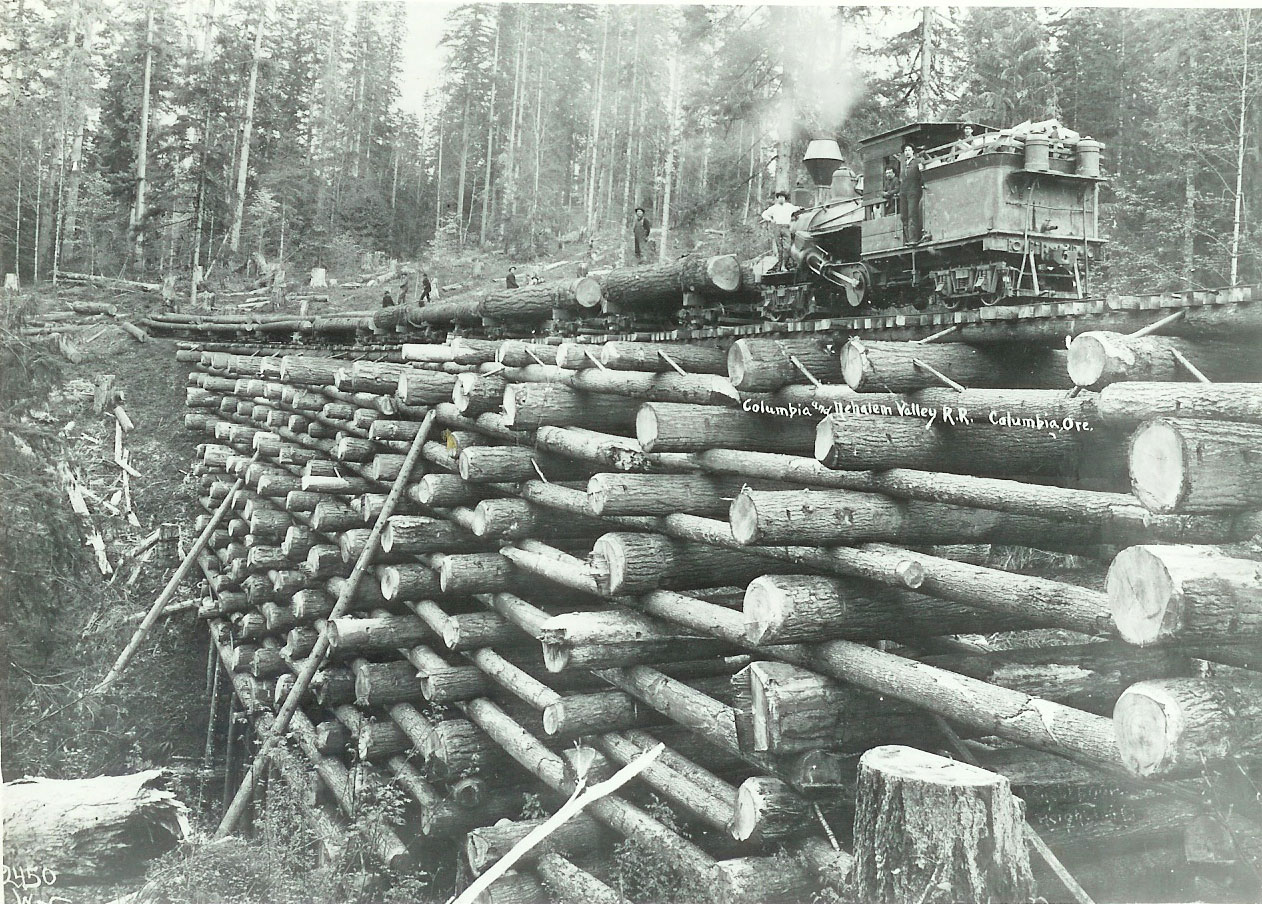
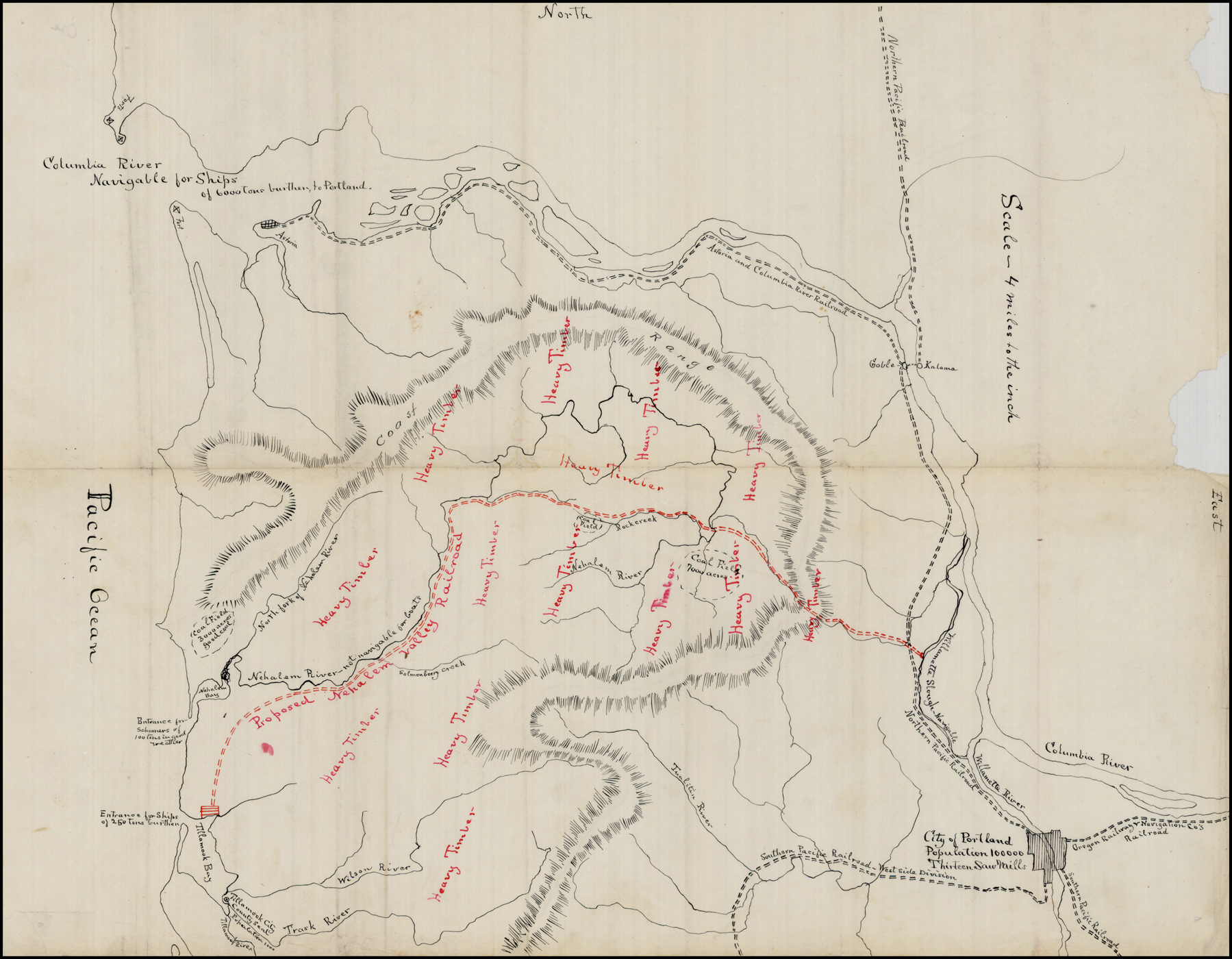
- Bridge at McBride Creek built from horizontal logs Original plan of the rail track, around 1902

Technical
- Line length: 8 miles (13 km)
- Track gauge: 1435 mm

The Columbia and Nehalem Valley Railroad was a standard gauge logging railroad near Columbia City, Oregon, which was owned by the Portland-based Peninsular Lumber Company.

== Location ==
The track started in Columbia City and was planned to be built to Pittsburg in the Nehalem Valley. It went uphill in a westward direction onto the heights between Milton Creek and Merrill Creek.

== History ==
The investors Goodsell, Giltner & Sewell of Portland announced on 7 March 1902 that they would build a logging railroad from Columbia City to Pittsburg. On 25 April 1902 they explained that the rail would lead to Oak Ranch Creek and would be 10–12 miles (16–19 km) long. They planned to use 6 steam locomotives.

On 29 June 1906, Giltner & Sewell of Portland sold 5,000 acres (2,000 hectares) of forest for $200,000 to the Peninsular Lumber Co., including 5 miles (8 km) of track and a jetty at the Columbia River. The sales price was based on stumpage of $1.25 per thousand. The Peninsular Lumber Co. owned a saw mill at the river, to which it could raft the logs.

The track was extended to 8 miles (13 km) until 1912 but didn't reach as far as Yankton.

== Bridges ==
A combined crib and trestle bridge was used to cross the McBride Creek. The sniped faces of the logs show that they were probably drawn by animals towards the construction site. This was sometimes done to allow construction before the area was accessible to heavy equipment.

== Locomotives ==
At least two or three steam locomotives were used, which were fired by wood. One of them was a 35 t geared Climax locomotive and one was a smaller conventional Lima locomotive. It is possible that additionally a geared Shay was used. One of them was a small Baldwin 2-8-2 Mikado.

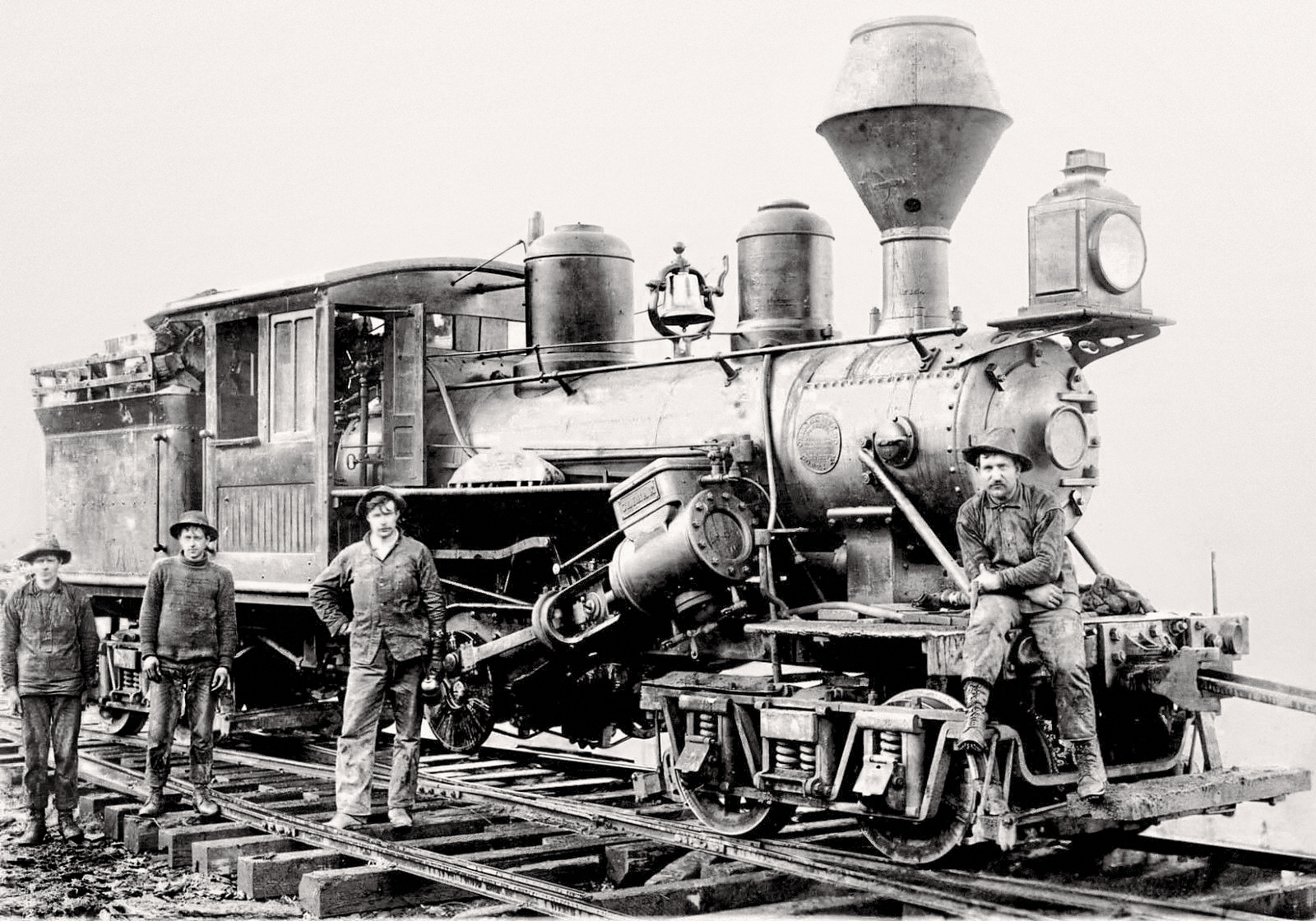
Climax logging locomotive

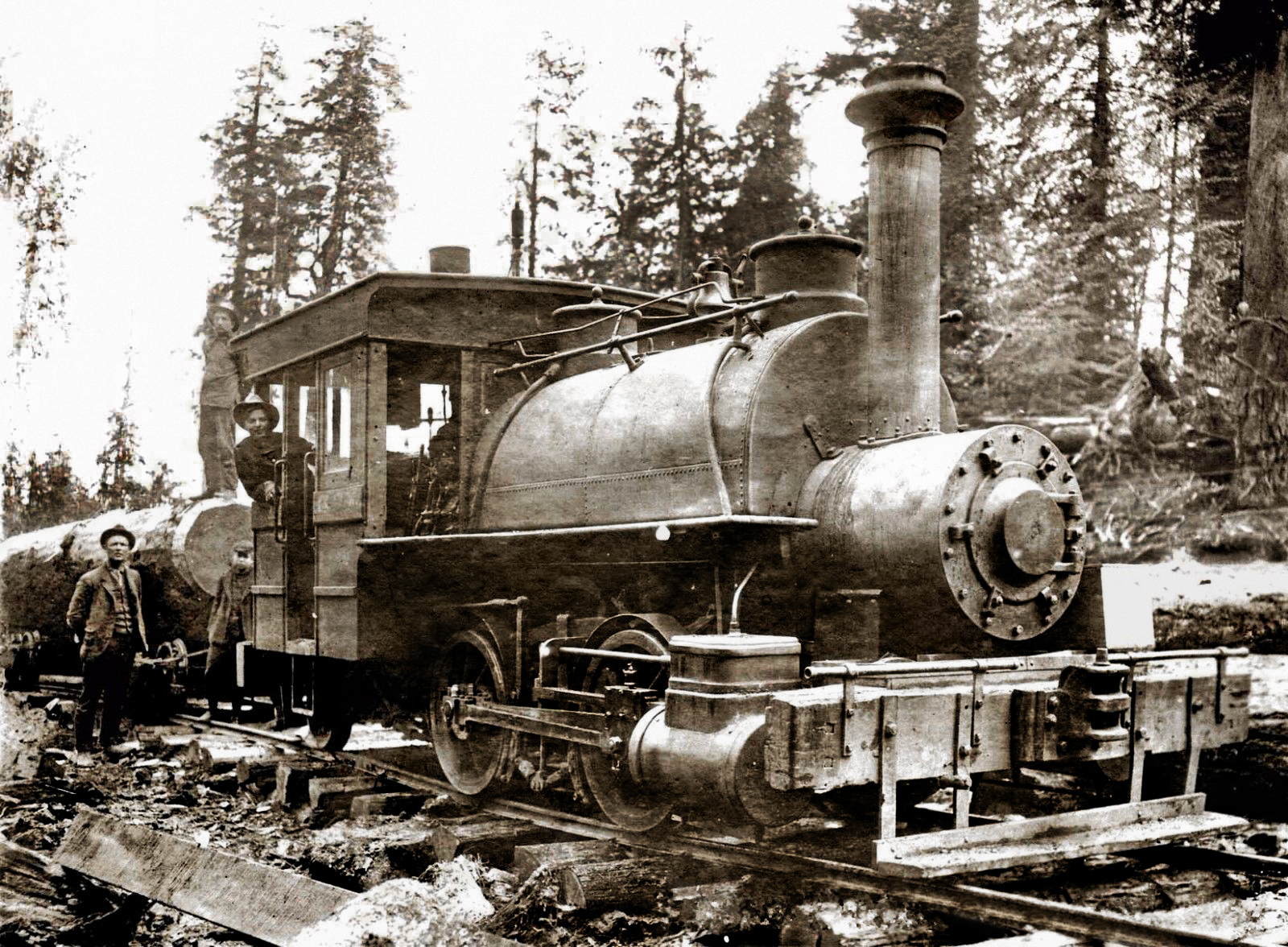
Lima steam locomotive

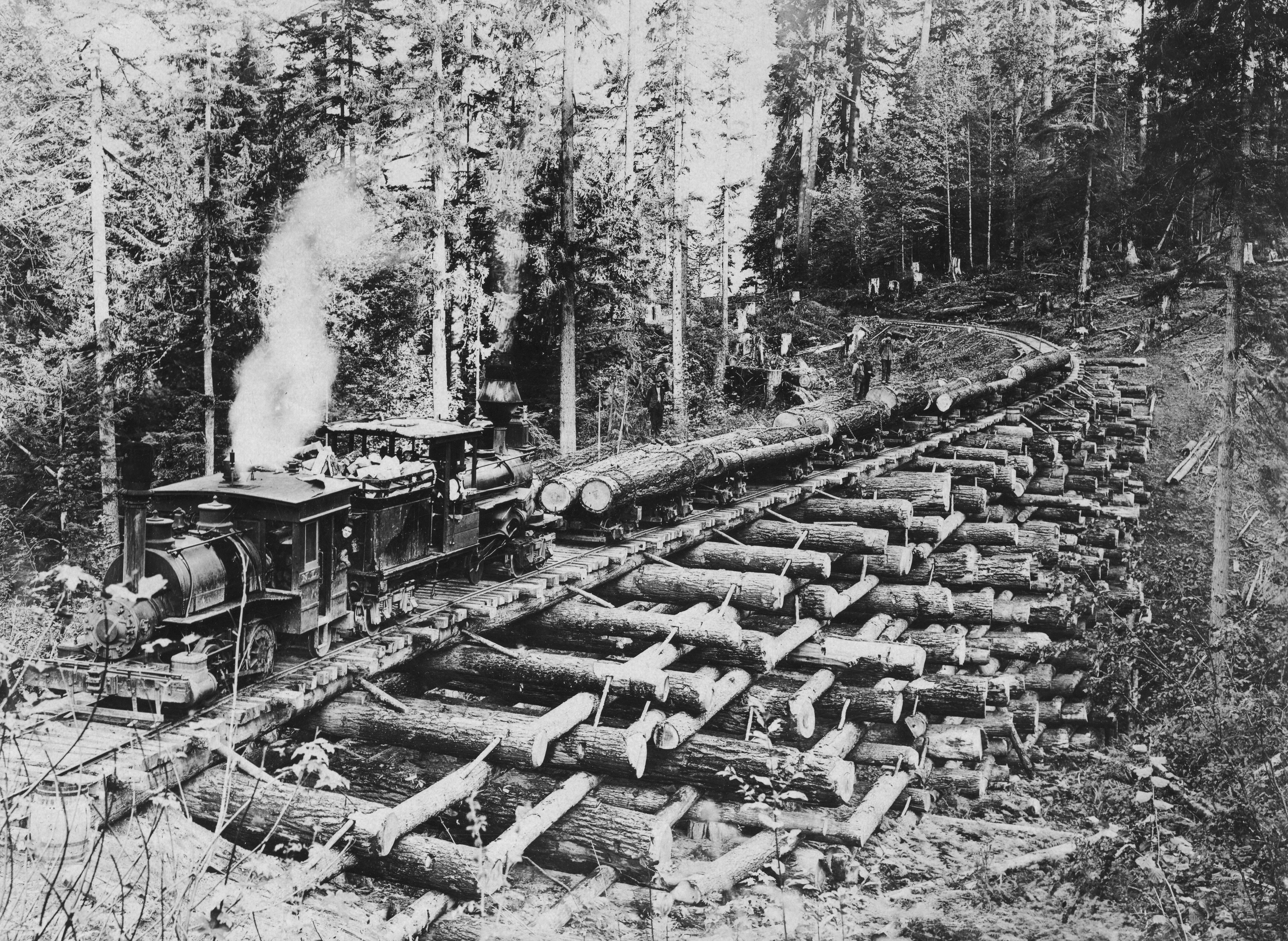
Bridge with fire fighting barrels

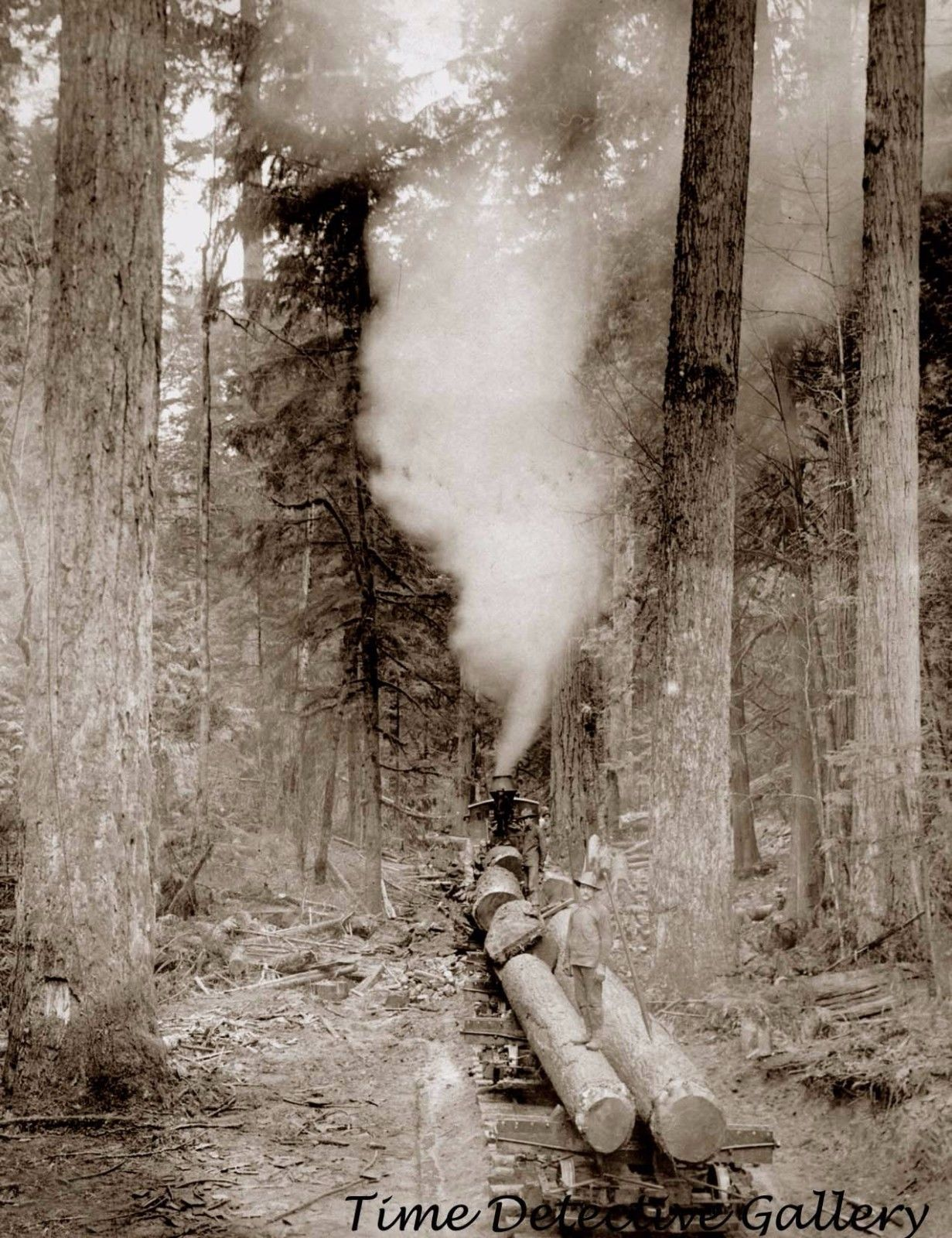
Logging train

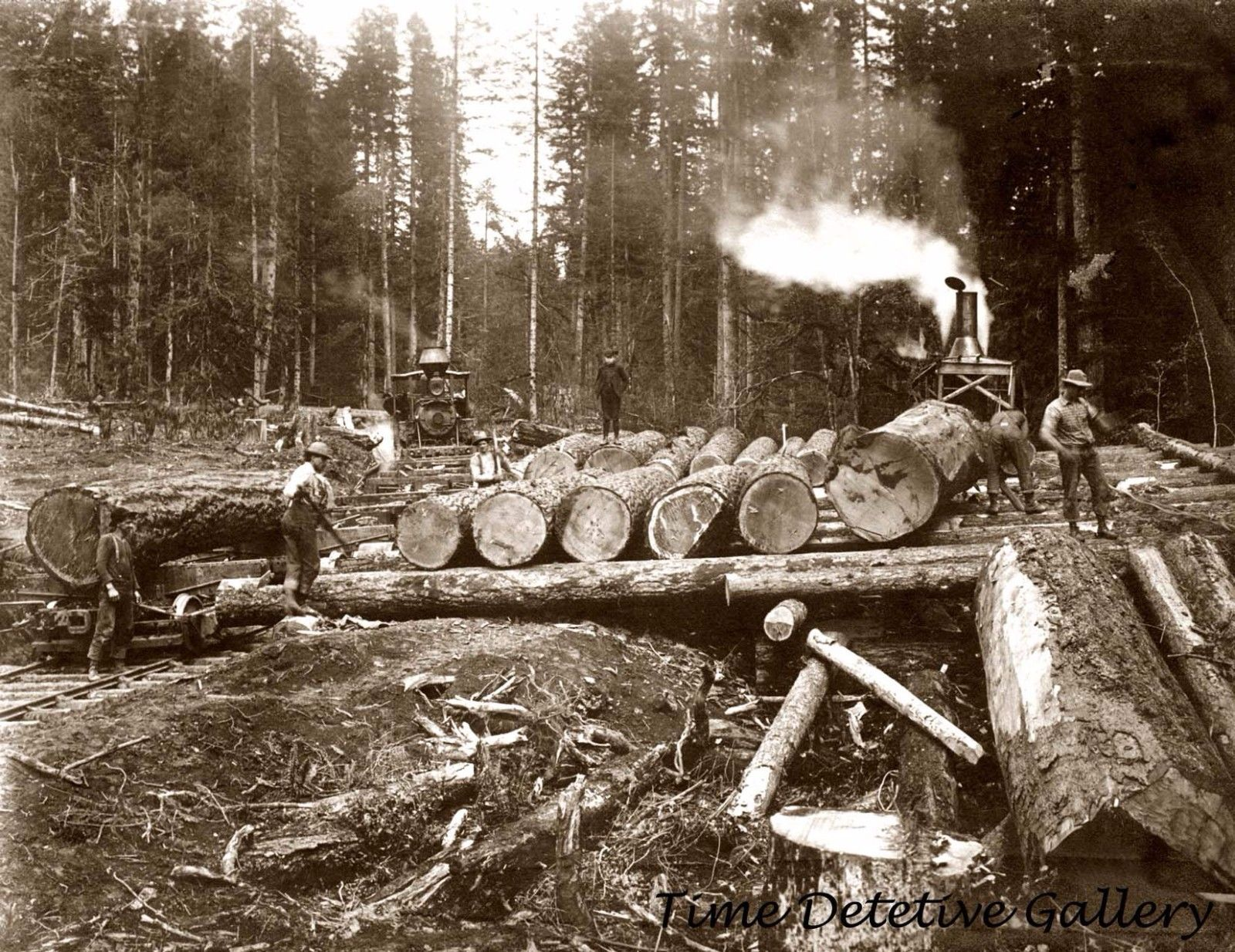
Loading area with steam winch
