= Columbia City, Oregon =

- City
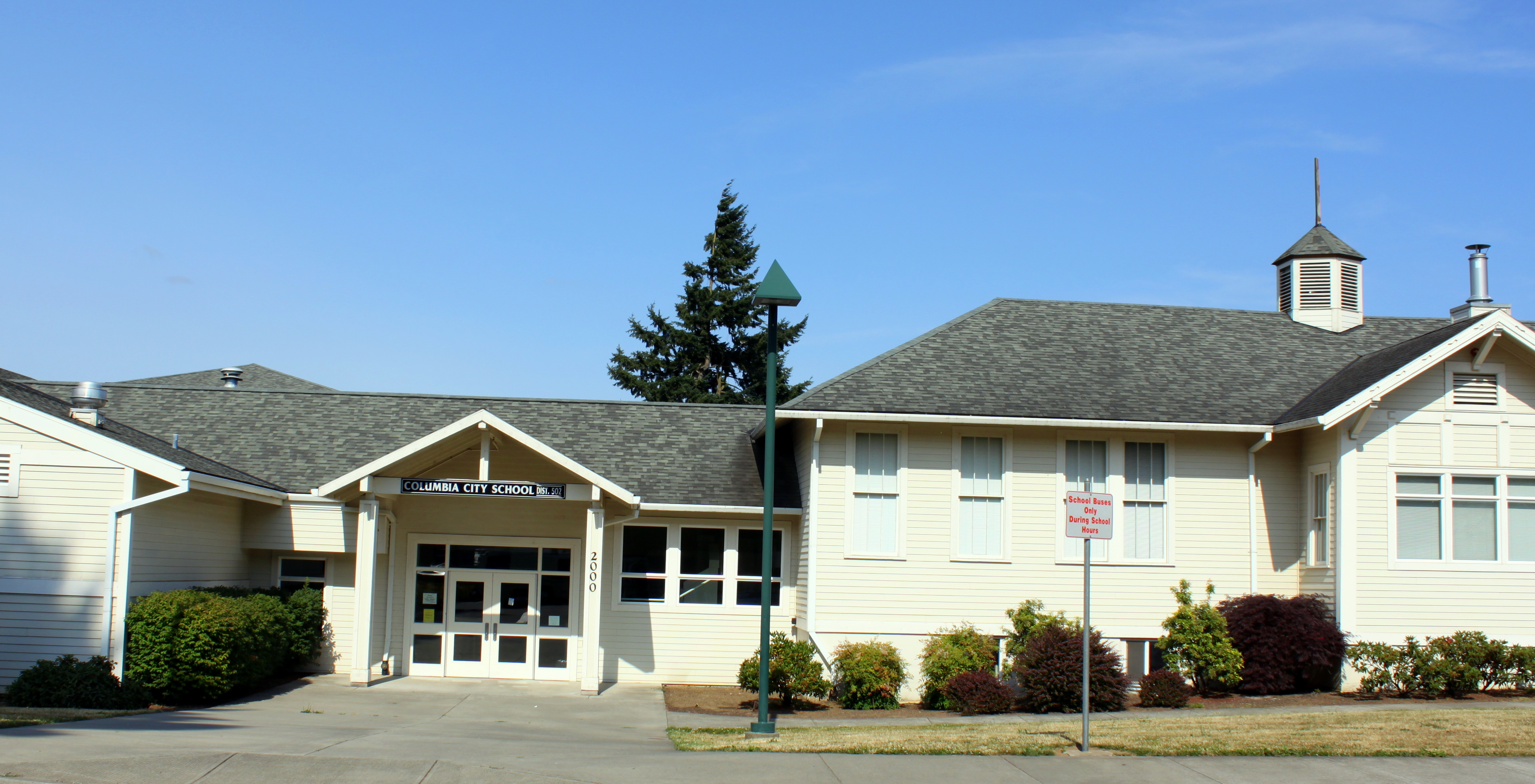
- Local elementary school
- Motto: "City of Beauty and Livability"
- Location in Oregon
- Coordinates: 45°53′42″N 122°48′41″W
- Country: United States
- State: Oregon
- County: Columbia
- Incorporated: 1926

Government
  - Mayor: Alexander Reed

Area
  - Total: 1.16 sq mi (3.00 km^{2})
  - Land: 0.78 sq mi (2.03 km^{2})
  - Water: 0.37 sq mi (0.97 km^{2})
- Elevation: 75 ft (23 m)

Population (2020)
  - Total: 1,949
  - Density: 2,484.3/sq mi (959.21/km^{2})
- Time zone: UTC-8 (Pacific)
  - Summer (DST): UTC-7 (Pacific)
- ZIP code: 97018
- Area code: 503
- FIPS code: 41-14750
- GNIS feature ID: 2410201
- Website: www.columbia-city.org

Columbia City is a city in Columbia County, Oregon, United States. It was named for its location on the Columbia River. As of the 2020 census, Columbia City had a population of 1,949.

== History ==
The Chinookan peoples were the original inhabitants of the region. This Native American tribe operated an active fishing settlement at the location known as "Cumahi".

Columbia City was founded in 1867 by Jacob and Joseph Caples. In 1870, the town had aspirations of becoming the terminus for Ben Holladay's Willamette Valley railroad. The same year, Portland became the terminus of the west-side line, but the railroad never reached Columbia City. Columbia City post office was established in 1871. In 1902 the Columbia and Nehalem Valley Railroad was built as a forest railway towards Yankton.

During World War I Columbia City built ships for the war effort, which was run by the Sommartson Shipbuilding Co. Sommartson Shipbuilding Co. Images They were ideally situated due to the channel coming so close to shore. The contracts were cancelled at the end of the war.

== Geography ==
According to the United States Census Bureau, the city has a total area of 1.15 square miles (2.98 km^{2}), of which, 0.77 square miles (1.99 km^{2}) is land and 0.38 square miles (0.98 km^{2}) is water.

=== Climate ===
This region experiences warm (but not hot) and dry summers, with no average monthly temperatures above 71.6 °F (22.0 °C). According to the Köppen Climate Classification system, Columbia City has a warm-summer Mediterranean climate, abbreviated "Csb" on climate maps.

== Demographics ==
Historical population
Census	Pop.	Note	%±
1930	310		—
1940	327		5.5%
1950	405		23.9%
1960	423		4.4%
1970	537		27.0%
1980	678		26.3%
1990	1,003		47.9%
2000	1,571		56.6%
2010	1,946		23.9%
2020	1,949		0.2%
U.S. Decennial Census

=== 2020 census ===
As of the 2020 census, Columbia City had a population of 1,949. The median age was 51.7 years. 16.0% of residents were under the age of 18 and 28.5% of residents were 65 years of age or older. For every 100 females there were 92.0 males, and for every 100 females age 18 and over there were 92.3 males age 18 and over.

100.0% of residents lived in urban areas, while 0% lived in rural areas.

There were 808 households in Columbia City, of which 23.8% had children under the age of 18 living in them. Of all households, 60.0% were married-couple households, 11.1% were households with a male householder and no spouse or partner present, and 19.9% were households with a female householder and no spouse or partner present. About 18.2% of all households were made up of individuals and 9.9% had someone living alone who was 65 years of age or older.

There were 832 housing units, of which 2.9% were vacant. Among occupied housing units, 89.2% were owner-occupied and 10.8% were renter-occupied. The homeowner vacancy rate was <0.1% and the rental vacancy rate was 4.4%.

Racial composition as of the 2020 census
Race	Number	Percent
White	1,723	88.4%
Black or African American	7	0.4%
American Indian and Alaska Native	15	0.8%
Asian	24	1.2%
Native Hawaiian and Other Pacific Islander	1	0.1%
Some other race	33	1.7%
Two or more races	146	7.5%
Hispanic or Latino (of any race)	112	5.7%

=== 2010 census ===
As of the census of 2010, there were 1,946 people, 787 households, and 601 families residing in the city. The population density was 2,527.3 inhabitants per square mile (975.8/km^{2}). There were 830 housing units at an average density of 1,077.9 per square mile (416.2/km^{2}). The racial makeup of the city was 94.6% White, 0.1% African American, 1.0% Native American, 1.5% Asian, 0.1% Pacific Islander, 1.0% from other races, and 1.7% from two or more races. Hispanic or Latino of any race were 3.0% of the population.

There were 787 households, of which 26.4% had children under the age of 18 living with them, 64.2% were married couples living together, 8.3% had a female householder with no husband present, 3.9% had a male householder with no wife present, and 23.6% were non-families. 18.4% of all households were made up of individuals, and 7.9% had someone living alone who was 65 years of age or older. The average household size was 2.47 and the average family size was 2.74.

The median age in the city was 48.4 years. 18.6% of residents were under the age of 18; 6.7% were between the ages of 18 and 24; 20.4% were from 25 to 44; 36% were from 45 to 64; and 18.4% were 65 years of age or older. The gender makeup of the city was 48.8% male and 51.2% female.

=== 2000 census ===
As of the census of 2000, there were 1,571 people, 595 households, and 448 families residing in the city. The population density was 2,106.6 inhabitants per square mile (813.4/km^{2}). There were 640 housing units at an average density of 858.2 per square mile (331.4/km^{2}). The racial makeup of the city was 95.61% White, 0.38% African American, 1.34% Native American, 0.70% Asian, 0.51% from other races, and 1.46% from two or more races. Hispanic or Latino of any race were 2.04% of the population. 19.9% were of German, 11.9% English, 11.0% Irish, 7.9% American, 6.5% Norwegian and 5.3% Scottish ancestry according to Census 2000.

There were 595 households, out of which 32.9% had children under the age of 18 living with them, 67.2% were married couples living together, 5.4% had a female householder with no husband present, and 24.7% were non-families. 19.0% of all households were made up of individuals, and 7.6% had someone living alone who was 65 years of age or older. The average household size was 2.63 and the average family size was 2.97.

In the city, the population was spread out, with 25.8% under the age of 18, 6.0% from 18 to 24, 25.5% from 25 to 44, 30.6% from 45 to 64, and 12.2% who were 65 years of age or older. The median age was 40 years. For every 100 females, there were 105.4 males. For every 100 females age 18 and over, there were 99.0 males.

The median income for a household in the city was $59,545, and the median income for a family was $62,596. Males had a median income of $46,964 versus $33,125 for females. The per capita income for the city was $25,266. About 2.8% of families and 4.5% of the population were below the poverty line, including 5.1% of those under age 18 and 3.7% of those age 65 or over.

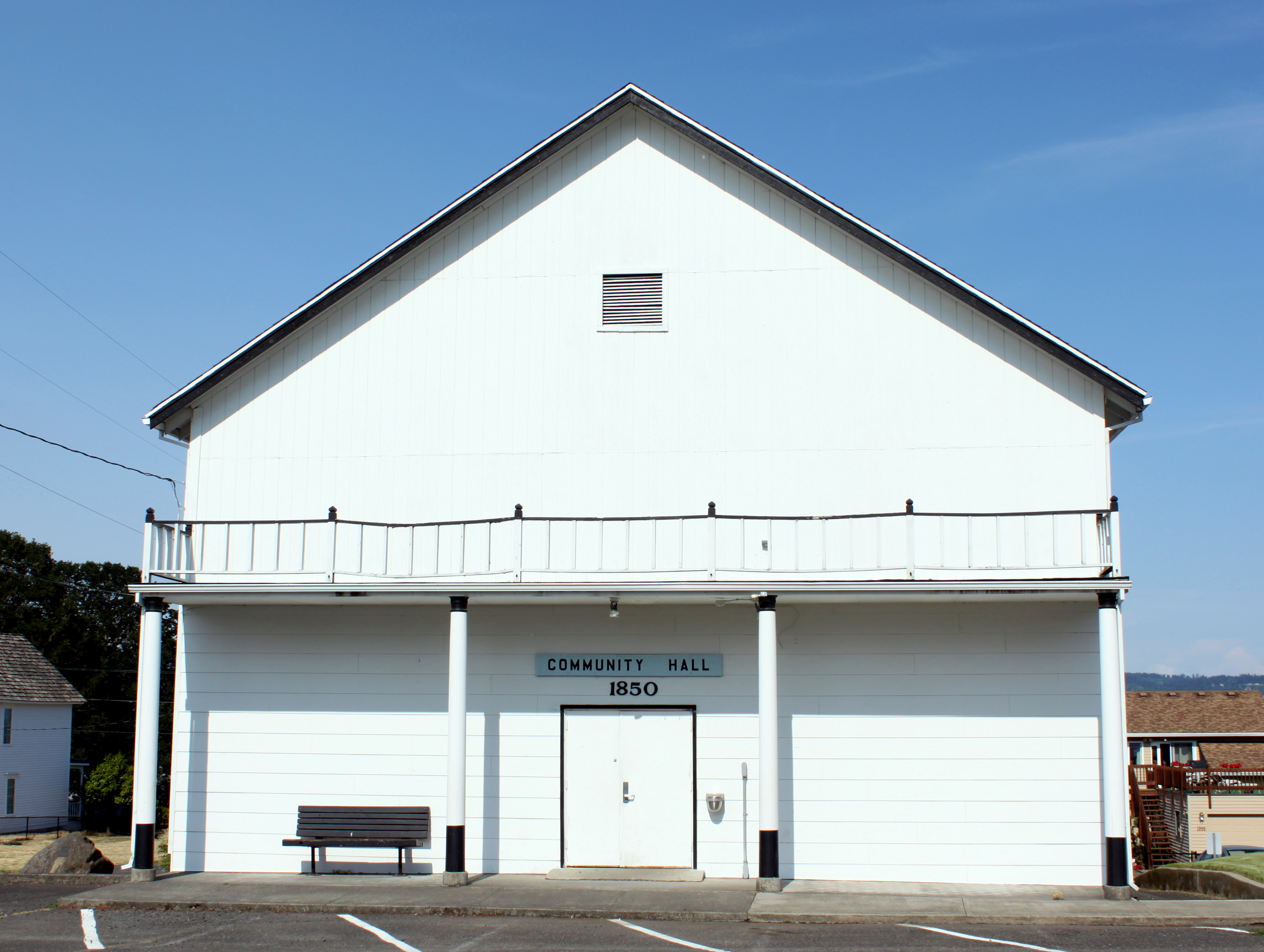
Community Hall

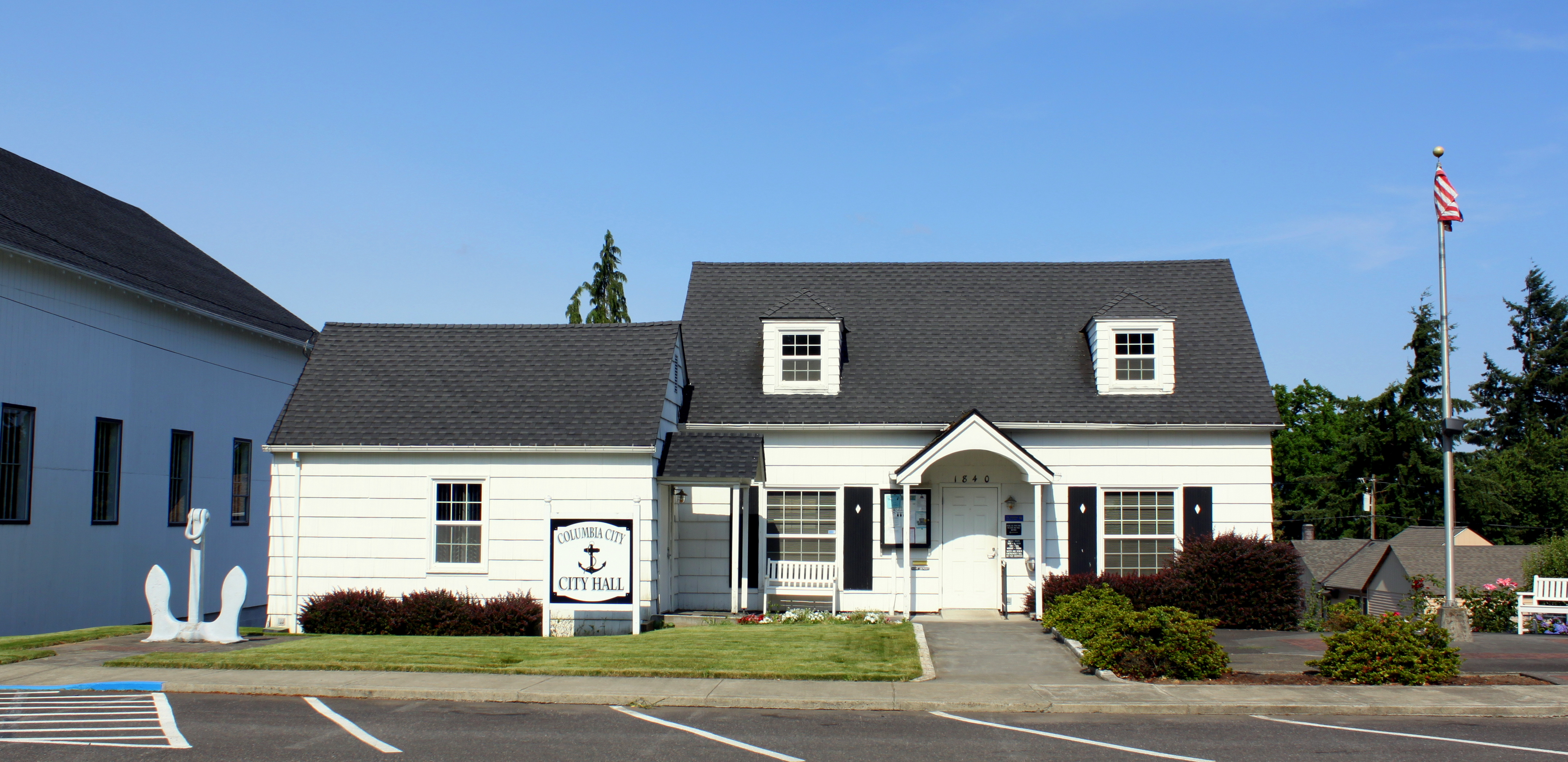
City Hall

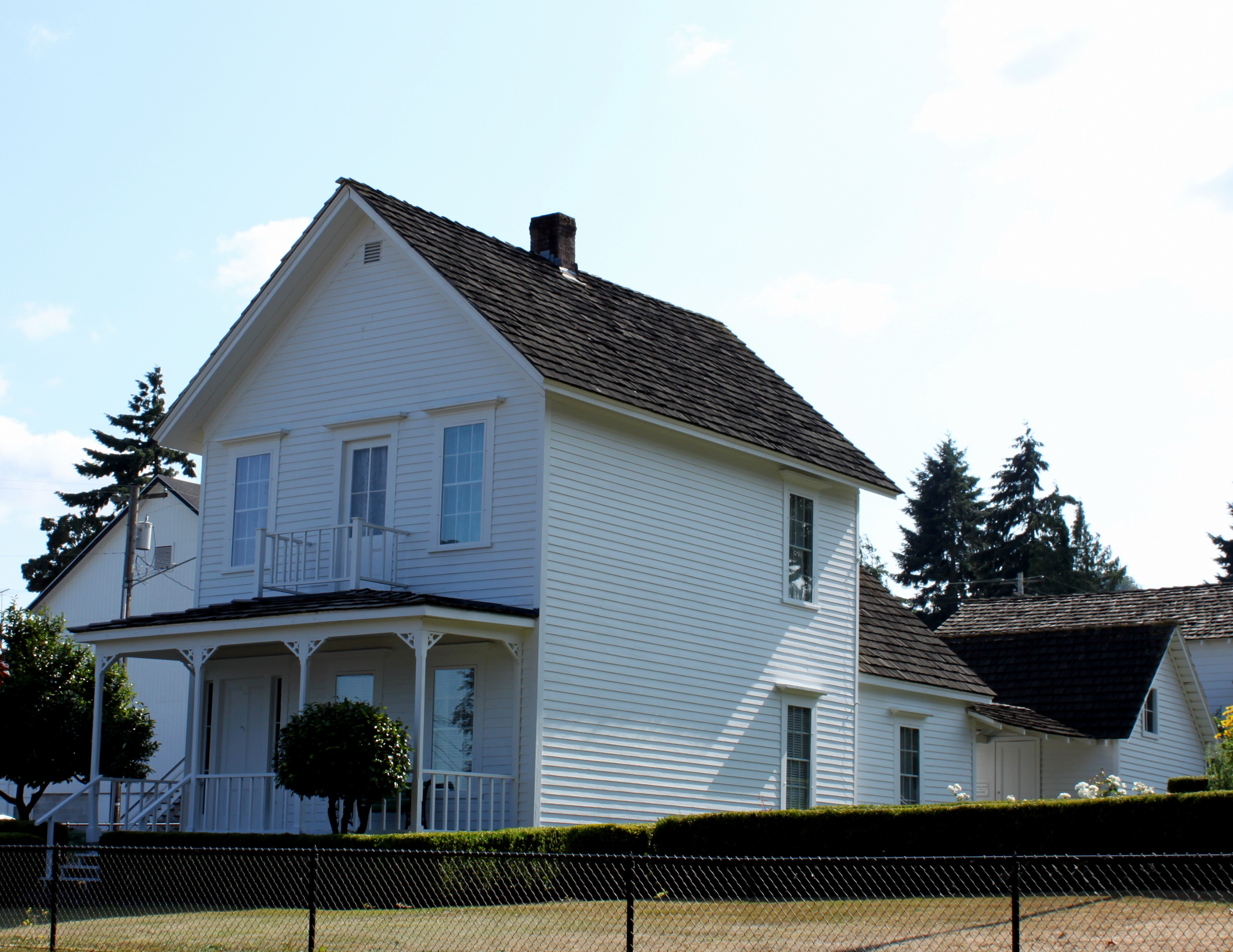
Caples House Museum

== Education ==
It is in the St. Helens School District.
