= Cribs =

Cribs may refer to:

- The Cribs, a band from the United Kingdom
- MTV Cribs, an American reality television program on MTV

== See also ==
- Crib (disambiguation)
- Crips
