= Columbia County Education Campus =

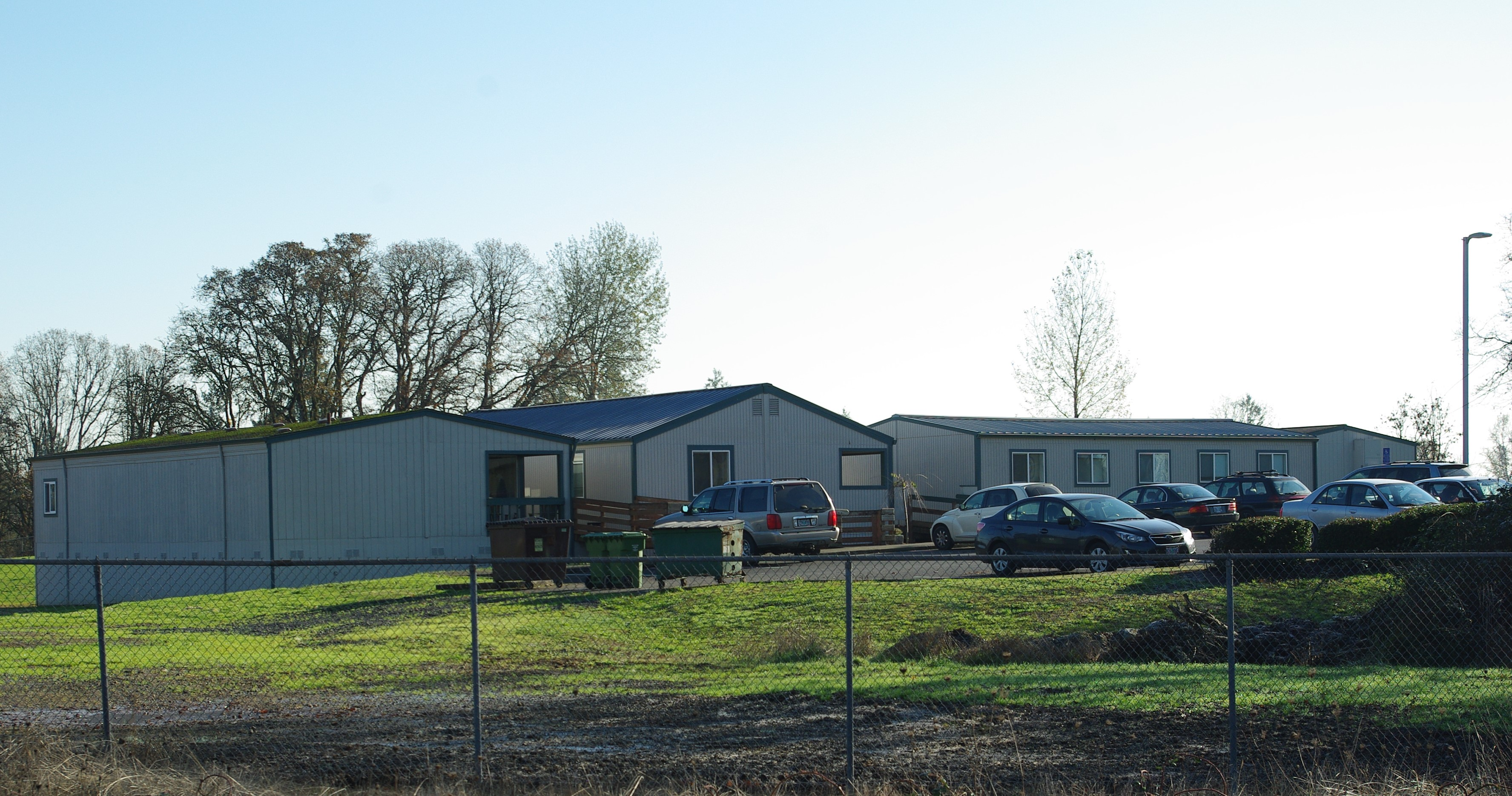

Location
- 474 N 16th Street; St. Helens, Columbia County, Oregon 97051; United States
- Coordinates: 45.865565°N 122.816023°W

Information
- Type: Public
- School district: St. Helens School District
- Director: Colleen Grogan
- Grades: 7-12
- Enrollment: 53
- Website: http://www.sthelens.k12.or.us/domain/278

Columbia County Education Campus is a public alternative school in St. Helens, Oregon , United States.

== Academics ==
In 2008, 50% of the school's seniors received their high school diploma. Of 36 students, 18 graduated, 6 dropped out, and 12 are still in high school.
