= St. Helens High School =

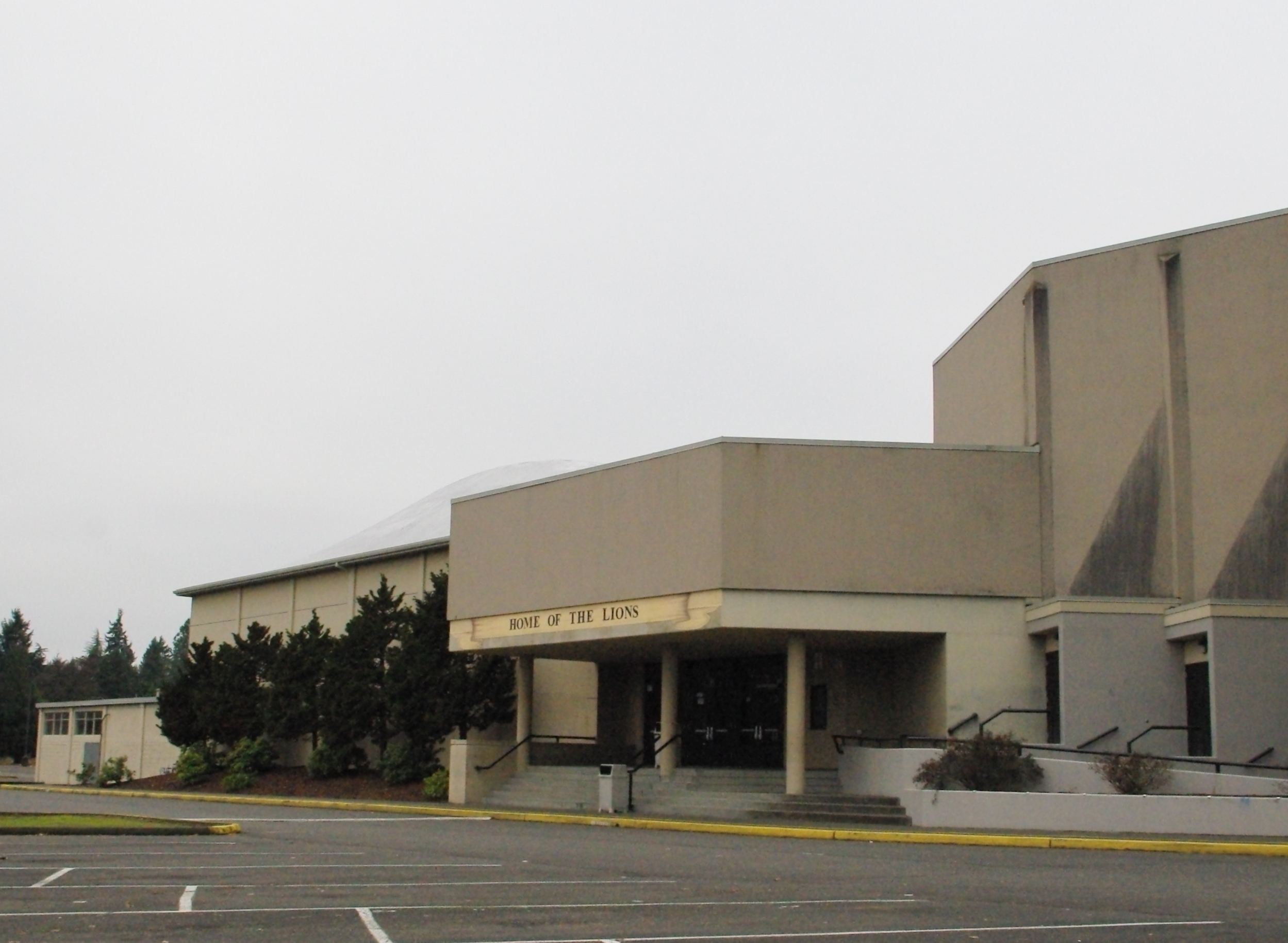

Location
- 2375 Gable Road; St. Helens, (Columbia County), Oregon 97051; United States; 45°50′59.06″N 122°49′56.09″W

Information
- Type: Public
- Established: 1950
- School district: St. Helens School District
- Principal: Robby Plowman
- Grades: 9–12
- Enrollment: 798 (2022-2023)
- Colors: Lemon and black
- Athletics conference: OSAA 4A-1 Cowapa League
- Mascot: Lion
- Team name: (St. Helens) Lions
- Rival: Scappoose High School
- Website: shhs.sthelens.k12.or.us

St. Helens High School (SHHS) is a public high school located in St. Helens, Oregon, United States. The city was founded in 1850 and the high school was built in the 1950s. During the 2022–2023 academic year, it served approximately 960 students.

An auxiliary filming for the movie Twilight took place at the school in April 2008.

== Academics ==
In 2015, St. Helens High School had a class size of 224 students. 73% were on-time graduates and 45 dropped out.

In 2014, St. Helens High School had a class size of 259 students. 85% were on-time graduates and 27 dropped out.

St. Helens High School offers nine Advanced Placement (AP) classes and 33 opportunities for college credit through Portland State University, Mount Hood Community College, and Portland Community College.

== Extracurricular activities ==
St. Helens High School's clubs include drama club and robotics club, which takes part in the FIRST Robotics Competition.

Sports include football, boys' and girls' soccer, volleyball, cheer, color guard, marching band, swim team, wrestling, boys' and girls' basketball, track & field, golf, baseball, softball, and boys' and girls' tennis.

In 2019 claims that opponents of St. Helens had been subjected to years of racist taunting were reported in the media and discussed in the State Senate.

=== Accomplishments ===
- Football 3A state champions – 1992, 1996
- Track & Field Boys 5A state champions – 2007
- Volleyball 5A state champions – 2014

== Legal issues ==
From 2005 to 2018, St. Helens High School knew of multiple incidents regarding the sexual misconduct of the history teacher, football coach, and track coach. The track coach, Kyle Wrobleski, was arrested in 2018 and found guilty. In March 2024, the St. Helens School District had to pay the student $3.5 million in a civil rights suit lawsuit settlement. In November 2024, choir director Eric Stearns and former math teacher Mark Collins were arrested for alleged sexual assault. This led to the placement of the principal and superintendent on paid administrative leave, the resignation of the school board chair, and calls for the firing of the entire school board.

== Notable alumni ==
- Holly Madison (1997) – television personality
