= CRIP2 =

Protein-coding gene in the species Homo sapiens

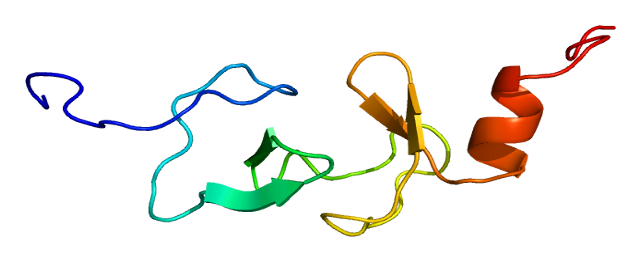

Identifiers
- Aliases: CRIP2, CRIP, CRP2, ESP1, cysteine rich protein 2
- External IDs: OMIM: 601183; MGI: 1915587; GeneCards: CRIP2
Available structures
PDB	Ortholog search: PDBe RCSB
PDB	List of PDB id codes 2CU8

Gene location (Human)
Chr.	Chromosome 14 (human)
Band	14q32.33	Start	105,472,962 bp
Band	14q32.33	End	105,480,162 bp

Gene location (Mouse)
Chr.	Chromosome 12 (mouse)
Band	12 F1|12 61.57 cM	Start	113,103,856 bp
Band	12 F1|12 61.57 cM	End	113,109,126 bp
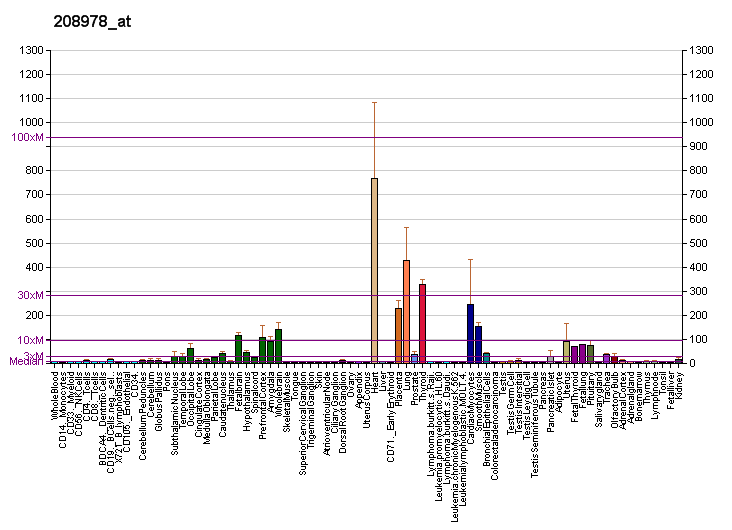
RNA expression pattern
Bgee	Human / Mouse (ortholog); Top expressed in: apex of heart; right auricle of heart; right coronary artery; popliteal artery; tibial arteries; Descending thoracic aorta; ascending aorta; left coronary artery; right uterine tube; left ventricle / Top expressed in: ankle joint; right ventricle; right lung; right lung lobe; left lung; gastrula; interventricular septum; endothelial cell of lymphatic vessel; lip; atrium; More reference expression data
BioGPS	More reference expression data
Gene ontology
Molecular function	metal ion binding; zinc ion binding; protein binding
Cellular component	cell cortex
Biological process	positive regulation of cell population proliferation; hemopoiesis
Sources:Amigo / QuickGO
Orthologs
Databases	NCBI: entry; OMA: entry
Species	Human	Mouse
Entrez	1397	68337
Ensembl	ENSG00000182809	ENSMUSG00000006356
UniProt	P52943	Q9DCT8
RefSeq (mRNA)	NM_001270837; NM_001270841; NM_001312	NM_024223; NM_001347443
RefSeq (protein)	NP_001257766; NP_001257770; NP_001303	NP_001334372; NP_077185
Location (UCSC)	Chr 14: 105.47 – 105.48 Mb	Chr 12: 113.1 – 113.11 Mb
PubMed search
- Wikidata
View/Edit Human	View/Edit Mouse

Cysteine-rich protein 2 is a protein that in humans is encoded by the CRIP2 gene.

CRIP2 and the closely related CRIP1 are cysteine-rich proteins containing two LIM domains. They are highly expressed during cardiovascular development and act to bridge serum response factor and GATA proteins and stimulate smooth muscle target genes.
