= Crib bridge =

Type of bridge

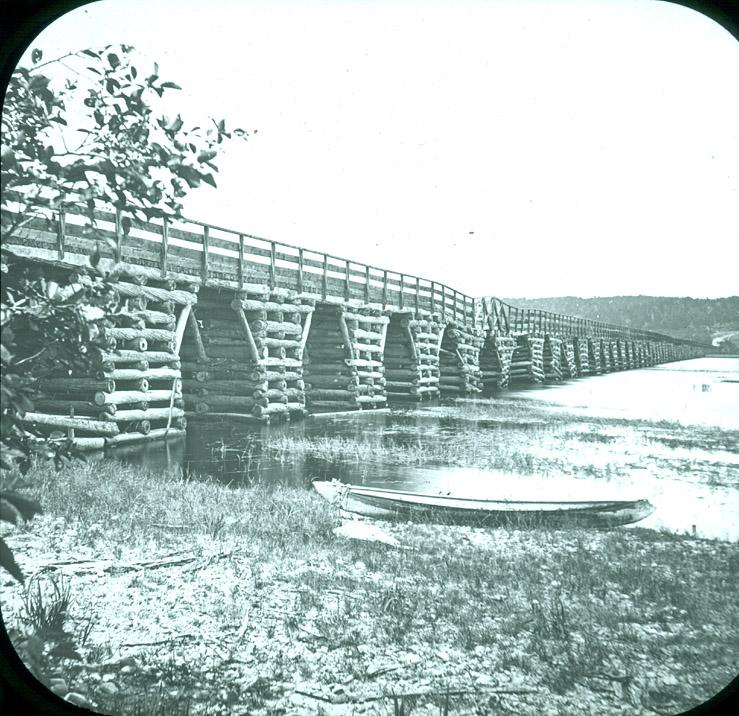
Bridge across Nerepis River at Westfield, 1875

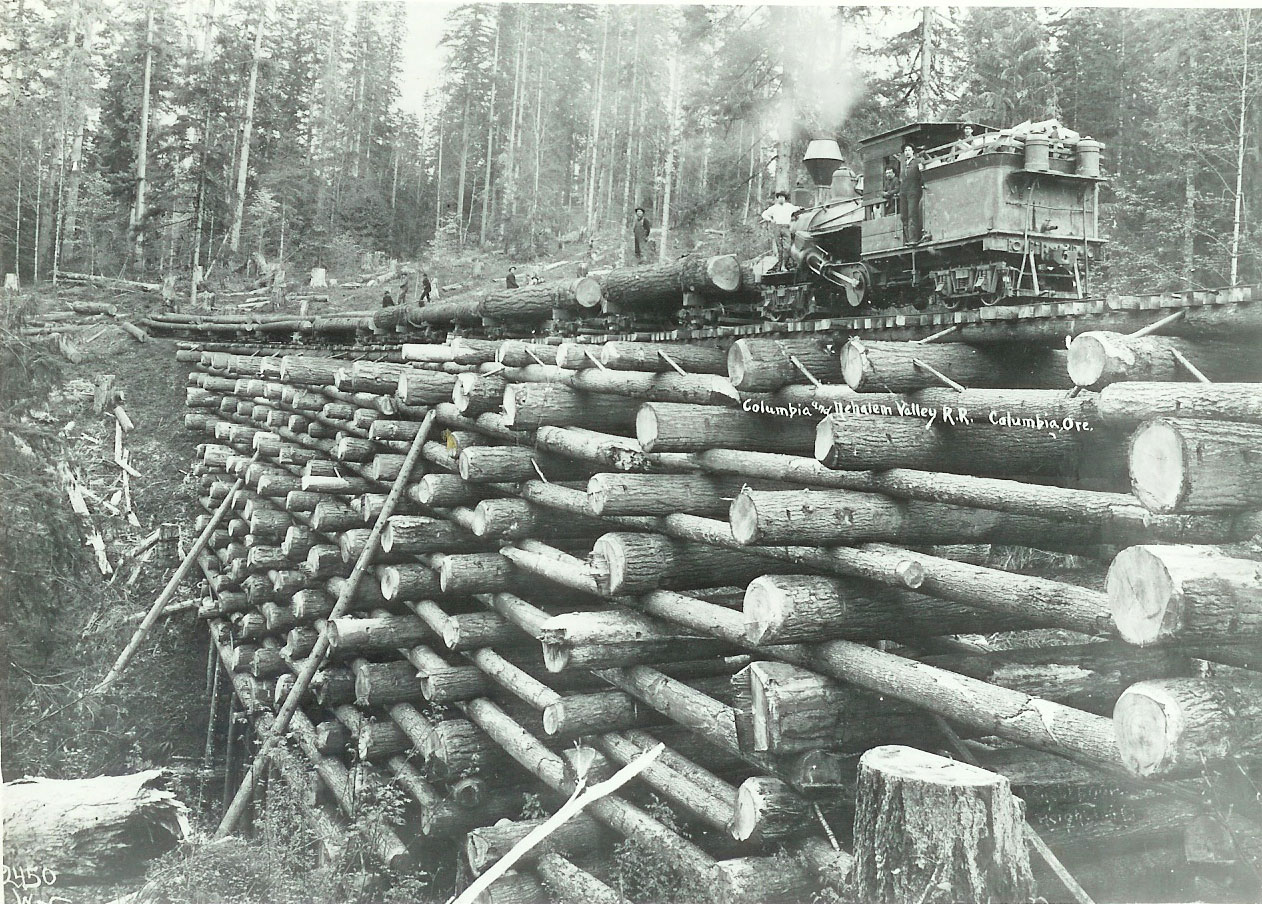
Crib bridge of the Columbia and Nehalem Valley Railroad at McBride Creek

Crib bridges were made from horizontally placed logs. The logs were laid first lengthwise, and then crosswise, in several layers. This consumed more trees than building trestle bridges, but they were easier to build without cranes or rams.

Less common are crib bridges made from stone, such as the Bailey Island Bridge.

== See also ==
- Crib pier
