= St. Helens School District =

School district in Oregon, USA

St. Helens School District is a public school district in the U.S. state of Oregon that serves the cities of St. Helens and Columbia City as well as Deer Island.

== Demographics ==
In the 2009 school year, the district had 43 students classified as homeless by the Department of Education, or 1.2% of students in the district.

== Schools ==
McBride Elementary School

McBride Elementary School is a school for Kindergartners to fifth graders. It is located at 2774 Columbia Boulevard. It is a low-lying one-story building located on the west side of town.

Lewis and Clark Elementary School

Lewis and Clark Elementary School is a school for Kindergarteners to fifth graders. It is located at 111 South 9th Street. It is a three-story building located on the east side of town.

Columbia City Elementary School

Columbia City Elementary School has just reopened beginning Sept 2017 for K-5th graders.

St. Helens Middle School

St. Helens Middle School is for six to eighth graders. It is a two-story building in the east side of town. The building was torn down and reconstructed in 2019. It is currently hosting many extracurricular activities such as a homework club, where kids work in silence in the library. Other activities include geography club, Game club builders club, PRISM club (a space to discuss LGBT+ topics), game club, writing club, Spanish club, robotics club, Students of Color Union, and a debate team. St Helens Middle School offers girls volleyball, girls and boys basketball, wrestling and track. There are also many other options such as football with SHYFL, club volleyball with CCVC Crushers, baseball, and basketball but these are not actually "school sports".

High schools

- St. Helens High School, grades 9-12
- Columbia County Education Campus, grades 9-12, alternative until 2018
- Plymouth High School, grades 9-12, alternative (New name of Columbia County Education Campus in new building)
