= Yankton, Oregon =

Unincorporated community in the state of Oregon, United States

Yankton
- Unincorporated community
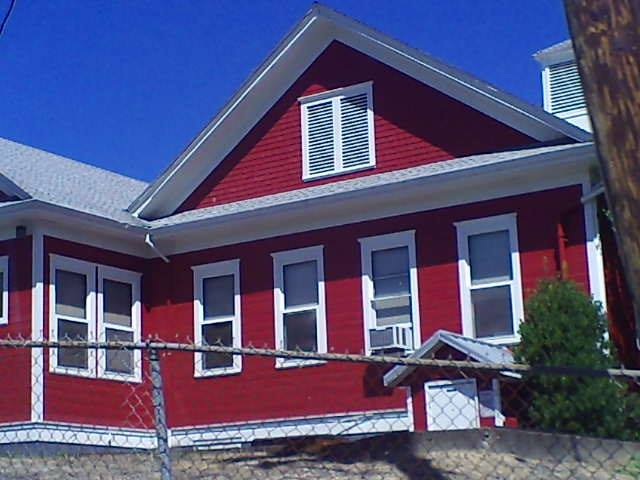
- The Yankton School House

- Location within Oregon
- Coordinates: 45°52′00″N 122°53′12″W
- Country: United States
- County: Columbia County
- ZIP code: 97051

Yankton is an unincorporated community in Columbia County, Oregon, United States. Located on the Milton Creek watershed, Yankton was established by three Tarbell families. First the community was called "Yankeetown" and "Maineville" but became Yanktown when the post office was established in 1894. The Yankton School House was thought to have been built in 1887, and First Baptist Church of Maineville (a Conservative Baptist congregation known as Yankton Baptist Church from 1904 through 2005, and renamed Yankton Community Fellowship in 2005) was established on August 12, 1893.

Yankton today is served by St. Helens post office and is under ZIP Code 97051.

Yankton is located within the St. Helens School District, Columbia River People's Utility District, Portland Community College District, Northwest Regional Educational Services District, Columbia Soil & Water Conservation District, Columbia Health District Public Health Authority, and Columbia River Fire & Rescue District.

== Gallery ==
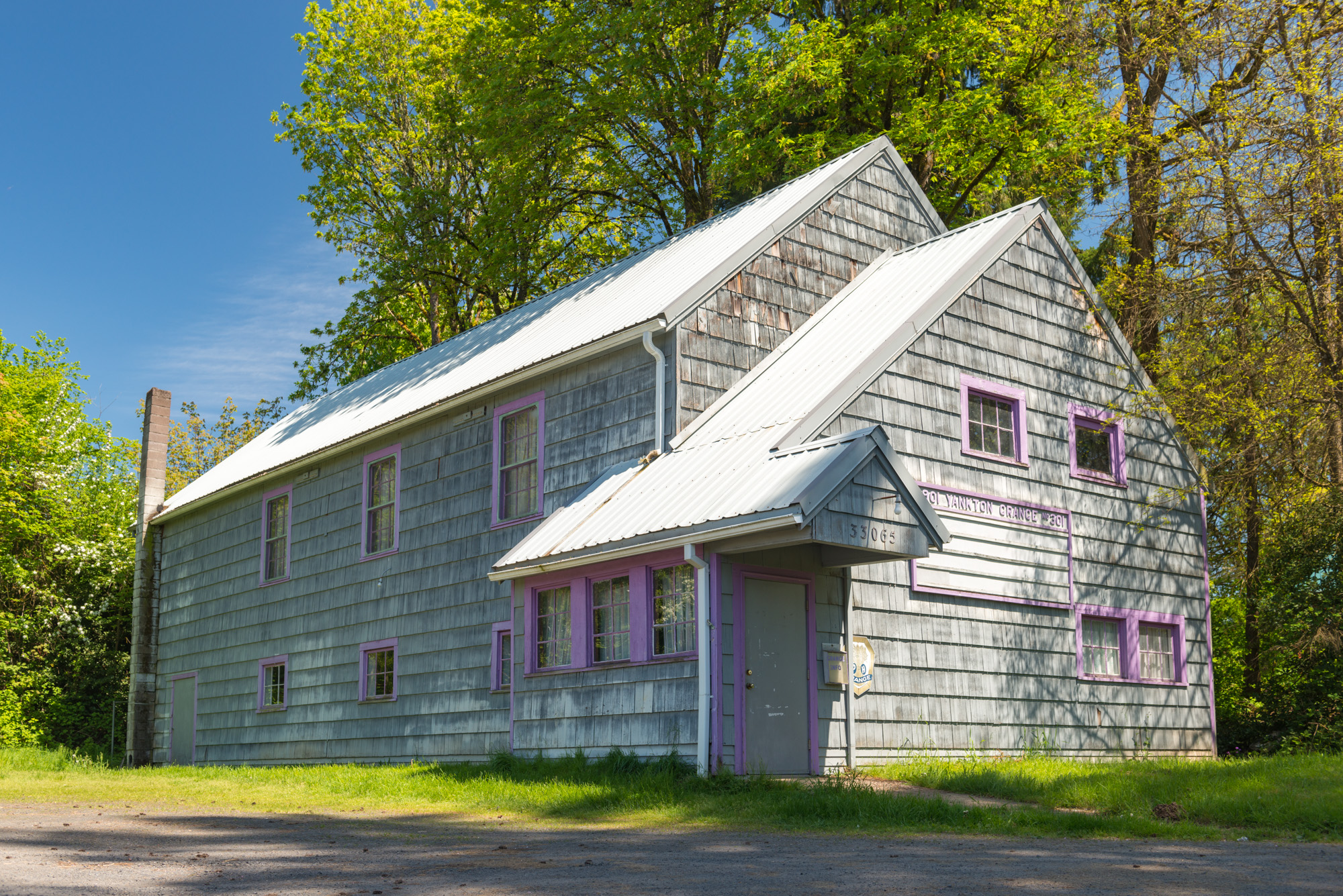
Yankton Grange Hall.

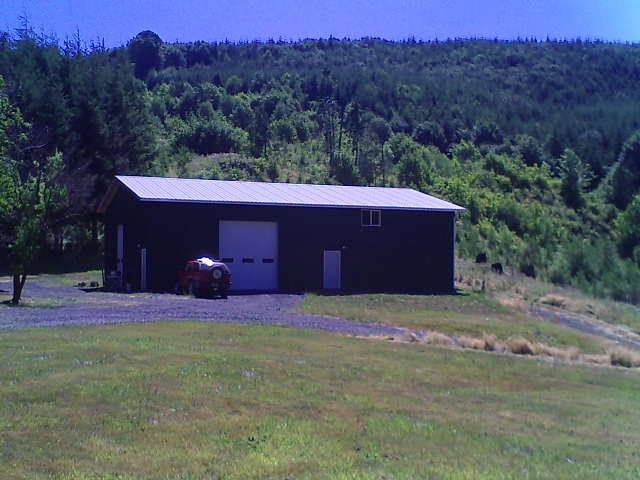
Tualatin Mountains behind a barn at Ingenuity Farm in Yankton

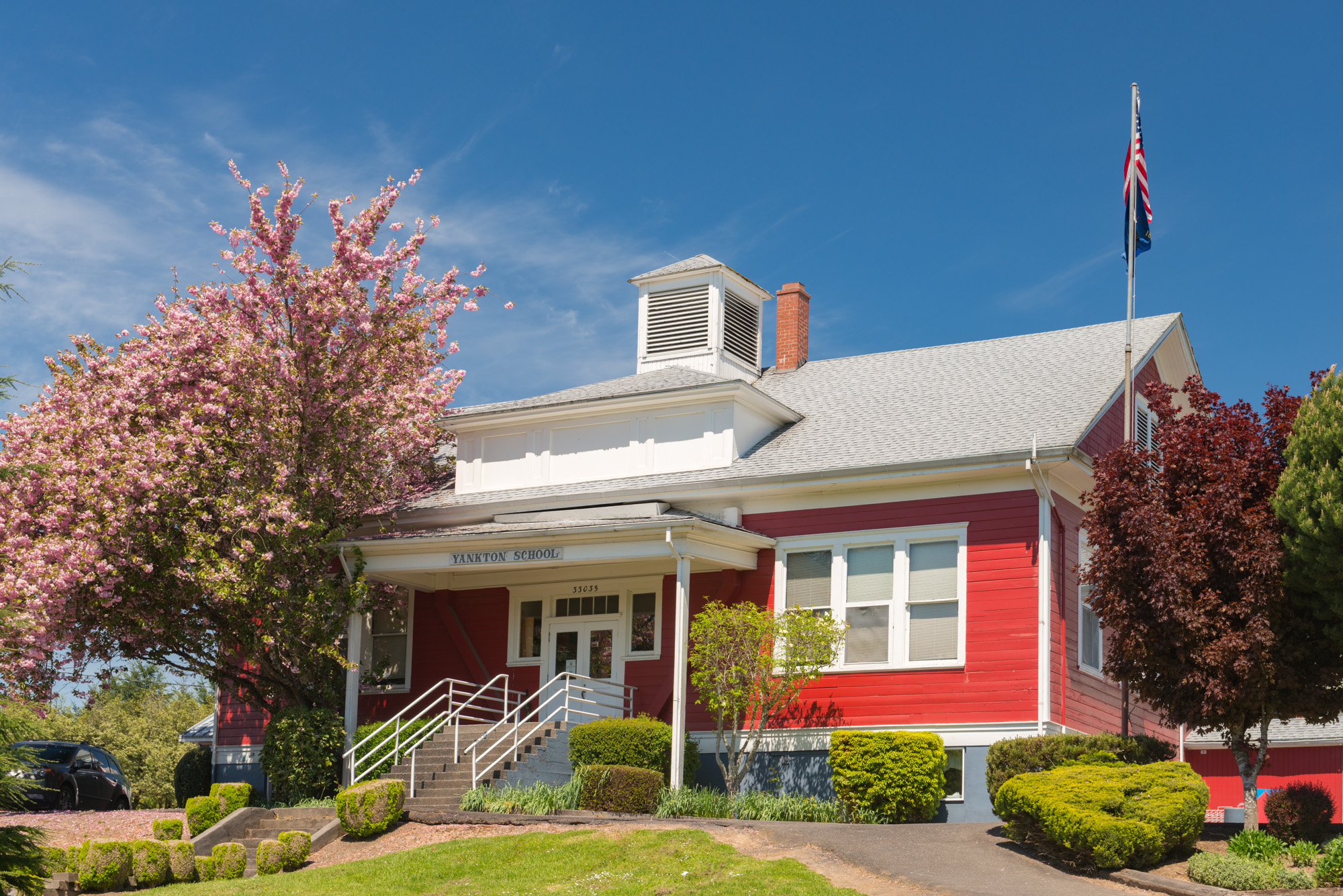
Yankton School.
