= CRIP1 =

Protein-coding gene in the species Homo sapiens

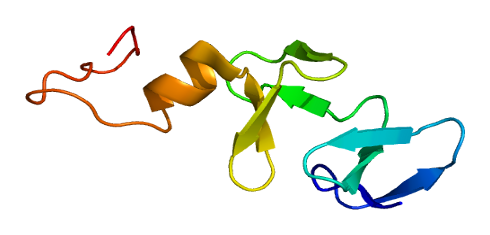

Identifiers
- Aliases: CRIP1, CRHP, CRIP, CRP-1, CRP1, cysteine rich protein 1
- External IDs: OMIM: 123875; MGI: 88501; GeneCards: CRIP1

Gene location (Human)
Chr.	Chromosome 14 (human)
Band	14q32.33	Start	105,486,317 bp
Band	14q32.33	End	105,488,947 bp

Gene location (Mouse)
Chr.	Chromosome 12 (mouse)
Band	12 F1|12 61.59 cM	Start	113,109,936 bp
Band	12 F1|12 61.59 cM	End	113,117,499 bp
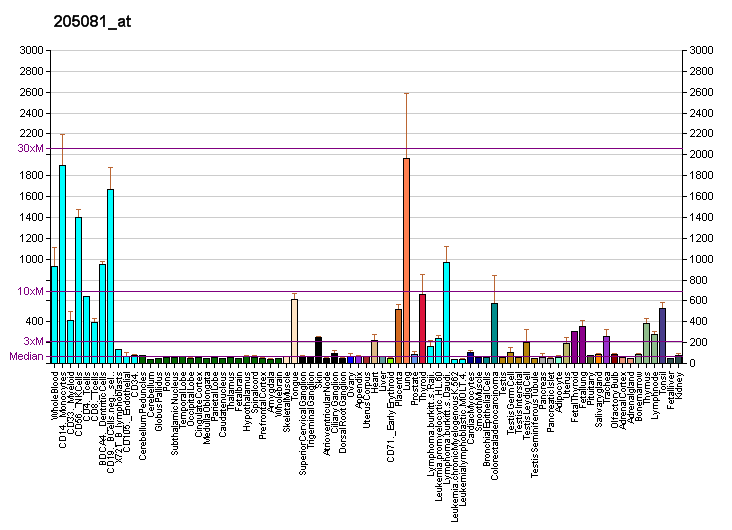
RNA expression pattern
Bgee	Human / Mouse (ortholog); Top expressed in: right coronary artery; granulocyte; left coronary artery; popliteal artery; tibial arteries; olfactory zone of nasal mucosa; right uterine tube; ascending aorta; Descending thoracic aorta; duodenum / Top expressed in: left colon; crypt of lieberkuhn of small intestine; duodenum; ankle; tunica media of zone of aorta; gastrula; umbilical cord; carotid body; Paneth cell; decidua; More reference expression data
BioGPS	More reference expression data
Gene ontology
Molecular function	peptide binding; DNA binding, bending; metal ion binding; minor groove of adenine-thymine-rich DNA binding; zinc ion binding
Cellular component	cytoplasm
Biological process	regulation of gene expression; prostate gland stromal morphogenesis; cellular response to antibiotic; development of the heart; response to zinc ion; cell population proliferation; cellular response to UV-B; response to organic substance; immune response; intrinsic apoptotic signaling pathway in response to DNA damage
Sources:Amigo / QuickGO
Orthologs
Databases	NCBI: entry; OMA: entry
Species	Human	Mouse
Entrez	1396	12925
Ensembl	ENSG00000213145	ENSMUSG00000006360
UniProt	P50238	P63254
RefSeq (mRNA)	NM_001311	NM_007763
RefSeq (protein)	NP_001302	NP_031789
Location (UCSC)	Chr 14: 105.49 – 105.49 Mb	Chr 12: 113.11 – 113.12 Mb
PubMed search
- Wikidata
View/Edit Human	View/Edit Mouse

Cysteine-rich protein 1 is a protein that in humans is encoded by the CRIP1 gene.

Cysteine-rich intestinal protein (CRIP) belongs to the LIM/double zinc finger protein family, members of which include cysteine- and glycine-rich protein-1 (CSRP1; MIM 123876), rhombotin-1 (RBTN1; MIM 186921), rhombotin-2 (RBTN2; MIM 180385), and rhombotin-3 (RBTN3; MIM 180386). CRIP may be involved in intestinal zinc transport (Hempe and Cousins, 1991).[supplied by OMIM]
