= East Bank Fault =

Geologic feature in Oregon, United States

The East Bank fault is one of three large faults that runs underneath Portland, Oregon. It runs under the University of Portland.
