= List of high schools in Oregon =

This is a list of high schools in the U.S. state of Oregon. Schools are listed in alphabetical order by city, then in alphabetical order by school name. Schools that have closed are listed separately.

== Current schools ==
=== Public schools ===
Image	Name	City	County	District	Enrollment	Mascot/team	OSAA	Type
	Academy for Character Education	Cottage Grove	Lane County	South Lane S.D.	18	Eagle	-	Charter
	Academy of Arts and Academics	Springfield	Lane County	Springfield S.D.	112			Magnet
	Adrian High School	Adrian	Malheur County	Adrian S.D.	86	Antelopes	1A	Traditional
	Adrienne C. Nelson High School	Happy Valley	Clackamas County	North Clackamas S.D.	1,382	Hawks	6A	Traditional
	Al Kennedy Alternative High School	Cottage Grove	Lane County	South Lane S.D.	78	Bears	-	Alternative
	Alliance Charter Academy	Oregon City	Clackamas County	Oregon City S.D.	254			Charter
	Aloha High School	Aloha	Washington County	Beaverton S.D.	1,686	Warriors	6A	Traditional
	Alsea High School	Alsea	Benton County	Alsea S.D.	65	Wolverines	1A	Traditional
	Amity High School	Amity	Yamhill County	Amity S.D.	272	Warriors	3A	Traditional
	Arlington High School	Arlington	Gilliam County	Arlington S.D.	58	Honkers	1A	Charter
	Armadillo Community Charter School	Phoenix	Jackson County	Phoenix-Talent S.D.	110	Armadillos	-	Charter
	Arts & Communication Magnet Academy	Beaverton	Washington County	Beaverton S.D.	305			Magnet
	Ashland High School	Ashland	Jackson County	Ashland S.D.	924	Grizzlies	5A	Traditional
	Astoria High School	Astoria	Clatsop County	Astoria S.D.	631	Fishermen	4A	Traditional
	Baker High School	Baker City	Baker County	Baker S.D.	503	Bulldogs	4A	Traditional
	Bandon Senior High School	Bandon	Coos County	Bandon S.D.	205	Tigers	2A	Traditional
	Banks High School	Banks	Washington County	Banks S.D.	375	Braves	3A	Traditional
	Beaverton High School	Beaverton	Washington County	Beaverton S.D.	1,483	Beavers	6A	Traditional
	Bend Senior High School	Bend	Deschutes County	Bend-La Pine S.D.	1,330	Lava Bears	5A	Traditional
	Benson Polytechnic High School	Portland	Multnomah County	Portland Public Schools	824	Techmen	6A	Technical
	Blue Mountain Alternative High School	John Day	Grant County	John Day S.D.	32			Alternative
	Bonanza High School	Bonanza	Klamath County	Klamath County S.D.	239	Antlers	2A	Traditional
	Brookings-Harbor High School	Brookings	Curry County	Brookings-Harbor S.D.	448	Bruins	3A	Traditional
	Burns High School	Burns	Harney County	Harney County S.D. 3	219	Hilanders	3A	Traditional
	Burnt River School	Unity	Baker County	Burnt River S.D.	47	Bulls	1A	Traditional
	Butte Falls Secondary School	Butte Falls	Jackson County	Butte Falls S.D.	88	Loggers	1A	Traditional
	Camas Valley Charter School	Camas Valley	Douglas County	Camas Valley S.D.	139	Hornets	1A	Charter
	Canby High School	Canby	Clackamas County	Canby S.D.	1,393	Cougars	5A	Traditional
	Caldera High School	Bend	Deschutes County	Bend-La Pine S.D.	939	Wolfpack	5A	Traditional
	Cascade High School	Turner	Marion County	Cascade S.D.	764	Cougars	4A	Traditional
	Centennial High School	Gresham	Multnomah County	Centennial S.D.	1,756	Eagles	5A	Traditional
	Center for Advanced Learning	Gresham	Multnomah County	Gresham-Barlow S.D.	12			Charter
	Central High School	Independence	Polk County	Central S.D.	1,100	Panthers	5A	Traditional
	Central Linn High School	Halsey	Linn County	Central Linn S.D.	286	Cobras	2A	Traditional
	Century High School	Hillsboro	Washington County	Hillsboro S.D.	1,551	Jaguars	6A	Traditional
	Chemawa Indian School	Salem	Marion County	Bureau of Indian Affairs	128	Braves	2A	Boarding
	Child's Way Charter School	Culp Creek	Lane County	South Lane S.D.	35			Alternative
	Chiloquin High School	Chiloquin	Klamath County	Klamath County S.D.	232	Panthers	2A	Traditional
	Clackamas High School	Clackamas	Clackamas County	North Clackamas S.D.	1,224	Cavaliers	6A	Traditional
	Clackamas Middle College	Oregon City	Clackamas County	North Clackamas S.D.	324			Charter
	Clackamas Web Academy	Clackamas	Clackamas County	North Clackamas S.D.	409	Coyotes		Charter
	Clatskanie High School	Clatskanie	Columbia County	Clatskanie S.D.	180	Tigers	2A	Traditional
	Cleveland High School	Portland	Multnomah County	Portland Public Schools	1,547	Warriors	6A	Traditional
	College Hill High School	Corvallis	Benton County	Corvallis S.D.		Wolverines		Alternative
	Colton High School	Colton	Clackamas County	Colton S.D.	152	Vikings	2A	Traditional
	Columbia County Education Campus	St. Helens	Columbia County	Saint Helens S.D.	53			Alternative
	Condon High School	Condon	Gilliam County	Condon S.D.	69	Blue Devils	1A	Traditional
	Connections Alternative School	Eagle Point	Jackson County	North Eagle Point S.D.	84			Alternative
	Coquille High School	Coquille	Coos County	Coquille S.D.	225	Red Devils	3A	Traditional
	Corbett High School	Corbett	Multnomah County	Corbett S.D.	322	Cardinals	3A	Traditional
	Corvallis High School	Corvallis	Benton County	Corvallis S.D.	1,284	Spartans	5A	Traditional
	Cottage Grove High School	Cottage Grove	Lane County	South Lane S.D.	665	Lions	4A	Traditional
	Cove School	Cove	Union County	Cove S.D.	252	Leopards	1A	Charter
	Crane Union High School	Crane	Harney County	Harney County (Crane) Union High S.D.	98	Mustangs	1A	Boarding
	Crater High School	Central Point	Jackson County	Central Point S.D.	1,453	Comets	5A	Traditional
	Crater Lake Academy	Eagle Point	Jackson County	Butte Falls S.D.			2A	Charter
	Creekside Community High School	Tigard	Washington County	Harney County (Crane) Union High S.D.	98	Mustangs	1A	Alternative
	Crescent Valley High School	Corvallis	Benton County	Corvallis S.D.	931	Raiders	5A	Traditional
	Creswell High School	Creswell	Lane County	Creswell S.D.	360	Bulldogs	3A	Traditional
	Crook County High School	Prineville	Crook County	Crook County S.D.	830	Cowboys	4A	Traditional
	Crow Middle/High School	Crow	Lane County	Crow-Applegate-Lorane S.D.	193	Cougars	2A	Traditional
	Culver High School	Culver	Jefferson County	Culver S.D.	230	Bulldogs	2A	Traditional
	Dallas High School	Dallas	Polk County	Dallas S.D.	836	Dragons	5A	Traditional
	The Dalles High School	The Dalles	Wasco County	North Wasco County S.D.	810	Riverhawks	4A	Traditional
	David Douglas High School	Portland	Multnomah County	David Douglas S.D.	2,698	Scots	6A	Traditional
	Days Creek Charter School	Days Creek	Douglas County	Days Creek S.D.	209	Wolves	1A	Charter
	Dayton High School	Dayton	Yamhill County	Dayton S.D.	323	Pirates	3A	Traditional
	Dayville School	Dayville	Grant County	Dayville S.D.	56	Tigers	1A	Traditional
	Destinations Academy	Coos Bay	Coos County	Coos Bay Public Schools	50			Alternative
	Douglas Avenue Alternative School	Gervais	Marion County	Gervais S.D.	16			Alternative
	Douglas High School	Winston	Douglas County	Winston-Dillard S.D.	393	Trojans	3A	Traditional
	Douglas McKay High School	Salem	Marion County	Salem-Keizer S.D.	2,311	Scots	5A	Traditional
	Dufur School	Dufur	Wasco County	Dufur S.D.	294	Rangers	1A	Traditional
	Eagle Point High School	Eagle Point	Jackson County	Eagle Point S.D.	999	Eagles	5A	Traditional
	Early College High School	Salem	Marion County	Salem-Keizer S.D.	350	Dragons	Alternative	
	Echo School	Echo	Umatilla County	Echo S.D.	271	Cougars	1A	Traditional
	Eddyville Charter School	Eddyville	Lincoln County	Lincoln County S.D.	231	Eagles	1A	Charter
	Elgin High School	Elgin	Union County	Elgin S.D.	165	Huskies	2A	Traditional
	Elkton High School	Elkton	Douglas County	Elkton S.D.	92	Elk	1A	Traditional
	Elmira High School	Elmira	Lane County	Fern Ridge S.D.	483	Falcons	3A	Traditional
	Enterprise High School	Enterprise	Wallowa County	Enterprise S.D.	188	Outlaws	2A	Traditional
	Estacada Alternative High School	Estacada	Clackamas County	Estacada S.D.	166			Alternative
	Estacada High School	Estacada	Clackamas County	Estacada S.D.	539	Rangers	4A	Traditional
	Falls City High School	Falls City	Polk County	Falls City S.D.	51	Mountaineers	1A	Traditional
	Forest Grove High School	Forest Grove	Washington County	Forest Grove S.D.	1,977	Vikings	6A	Traditional
	Franklin High School	Portland	Multnomah County	Portland Public Schools	1,966	Lightning	6A	Traditional
	Gaston Senior High School	Gaston	Washington County	Gaston S.D.	164	Greyhounds	2A	Traditional
	Gateways High School	Springfield	Lane County	Springfield S.D.	122			Alternative
	Gervais High School	Gervais	Marion County	Gervais S.D.	317	Cougars	2A	Traditional
	Gilchrist Junior/Senior High School	Gilchrist	Klamath County	Klamath County S.D.	111	Grizzlies	1A	Traditional
	Gladstone High School	Gladstone	Clackamas County	Gladstone S.D.	594	Gladiators	4A	Traditional
	Glencoe High School	Hillsboro	Washington County	Hillsboro S.D.	1,500	Crimson Tide	6A	Traditional
	Glendale Jr/Sr High School	Glendale	Douglas County	Glendale S.D.	218	Pirates	2A	Traditional
	Glide High School	Glide	Douglas County	Glide S.D.	199	Wildcats	3A	Traditional
	Gold Beach High School	Gold Beach	Curry County	Central Curry S.D.	123	Panthers	2A	Traditional
	Grant High School	Portland	Multnomah County	Portland Public Schools	2,156	Generals	6A	Traditional
	Grants Pass High School	Grants Pass	Josephine County	Grants Pass S.D.	1,722	Cavemen	6A	Traditional
	Grant Union High School	John Day	Grant County	John Day S.D.	153	Prospectors	2A	Traditional
	Gresham High School	Gresham	Multnomah County	Gresham-Barlow S.D.	1,666	Gophers	6A	Traditional
	Harper K-12 School	Harper	Malheur County	Harper S.D.	92	Hornets	1A	Traditional
	Harrisburg High School	Harrisburg	Linn County	Harrisburg S.D.	250	Eagles	3A	Traditional
	Helensview School	Portland	Multnomah County	Multnomah Education Service District				Alternative
	Helix School	Helix	Umatilla County	Helix S.D.	155	Grizzlies	1A	Traditional
	Henley High School	Klamath Falls	Klamath County	Klamath County S.D.	693	Hornets	4A	Traditional
	Heppner Senior High School	Heppner	Morrow County	Morrow County S.D.	102	Mustangs	2A	Traditional
	Hermiston High School	Hermiston	Umatilla County	Hermiston S.D.	1413	Bulldogs	5A	Traditional
	Hidden Valley High School	Grants Pass	Josephine County	Three Rivers S.D.	537	Mustangs	4A	Traditional
	Hillsboro High School	Hillsboro	Washington County	Hillsboro S.D.	1,359	Spartans	5A	Traditional
	Hood River Valley High School	Hood River	Hood River County	Hood River County S.D.	1,209	Eagles	5A	Traditional
	Huntington High School	Huntington	Baker County	Huntington S.D.	81	Locomotives	1A	Traditional
	Ida B. Wells-Barnett High School	Portland	Multnomah County	Portland Public Schools	1,556	Guardians	6A	Traditional
	Illinois Valley High School	Cave Junction	Josephine County	Three Rivers S.D.	320	Cougars	2A	Traditional
	Imbler High School	Imbler	Union County	Imbler S.D.	157	Panthers	1A	Traditional
	International School of Beaverton	Beaverton	Washington County	Beaverton S.D.	593	Dragons		Magnet
	Ione Community Charter School	Ione	Morrow County	Ione S.D.	156	Cardinals	1A	Charter
	Irrigon Senior High School	Irrigon	Morrow County	Morrow County S.D.	227	Knights	2A	Traditional
	Jefferson High School	Jefferson	Marion County	Jefferson S.D.	240	Lions	3A	Traditional
	Jefferson High School	Portland	Marion County	Portland Public Schools	606	Democrats	6A	Traditional
	Jewell School	Jewell	Clatsop County	Jewell S.D.	48	Bluejays	1A	Traditional
	John F. Kennedy High School	Mt. Angel	Marion County	Mt. Angel S.D.	220	Trojans	2A	Traditional
	Jordan Valley High School	Jordan Valley	Malheur County	Jordan Valley S.D.	36	Mustangs	1A	Traditional
	Joseph High School	Joseph	Wallowa County	Joseph S.D.	87	Eagles	1A	Traditional
	Junction City High School	Junction City	Lane County	Junction City S.D.	539	Tigers	4A	Traditional
	Kalapuya High School	Eugene	Lane County	Bethel S.D.	165			Alternative
	Kings Valley Charter School	Kings Valley	Benton County	Philomath S.D.	183	Pioneers	1A	Charter
	Klamath Union High School	Klamath Falls	Klamath County	Klamath Falls City S.D.	645	Pelicans	4A	Traditional
	Knappa High School	Knappa	Clatsop County	Knappa S.D.	142	Loggers	2A	Traditional
	La Grande High School	La Grande	Union County	La Grande S.D.	647	Tigers	4A	Traditional
	La Pine High School	La Pine	Deschutes County	Bend-La Pine S.D.	459	Hawks	3A	Traditional
	Lake Oswego High School	Lake Oswego	Clackamas County	Lake Oswego S.D.	1,245	Lakers	6A	Traditional
	Lakeridge High School	Lake Oswego	Clackamas County	Lake Oswego S.D.	1,234	Pacers	6A	Traditional
	Lakeview High School	Lakeview	Lake County	Lake County S.D.	265	Honkers	3A	Traditional
	Lebanon High School	Lebanon	Linn County	Lebanon Community Schools	1,289	Warriors	5A	Traditional
	Leodis V. McDaniel High School	Portland	Multnomah County	Portland Public Schools	1,440	Mountain Lions	6A	Traditional
	Liberty High School	Hillsboro	Washington County	Hillsboro S.D.	1,454	Falcons	6A	Traditional
	Lincoln City Career Technical High School	Lincoln City	Lincoln County	Lincoln County S.D.	52			Charter
	Lincoln High School	Portland	Multnomah County	Portland Public Schools	1,525	Cardinals	6A	Traditional
	Long Creek School	Long Creek	Grant County	Long Creek S.D.	40	Mountaineers	1A	Traditional
	Lost River Jr./Sr. High School	Merrill	Klamath County	Klamath County S.D.	291	Raiders	2A	Traditional
	Lowell Senior High School	Lowell	Lane County	Lowell S.D.	136	Devils	2A	Traditional
	Madras High School	Madras	Jefferson County	Jefferson County S.D.	781	White Buffalos	4A	Traditional
	Mapleton Junior/Senior High School	Mapleton	Lane County	Mapleton S.D.	81	Sailors	1A	Traditional
	Marshall High School	Bend	Deschutes County	Bend-La Pine S.D.	182	Explorers		Magnet
	Marshfield High School	Coos Bay	Coos County	Coos Bay Public Schools	835	Pirates	4A	Traditional
	Mazama High School	Klamath Falls	Klamath County	Klamath County S.D.	690	Vikings	4A	Traditional
	McDermitt Combined School	McDermitt, Oregon	Malheur County	Humboldt County School District (Nevada)	36	Bulldogs		Traditional
	McKenzie High School	Finn Rock	Lane County	McKenzie S.D.	92	Eagles	1A	Traditional
	McLoughlin High School	Milton-Freewater	Umatilla County	Milton-Freewater S.D.	491	Pioneers	3A	Traditional
	McMinnville High School	McMinnville	Yamhill County	McMinnville S.D.	2,319	Grizzlies	6A	Traditional
	McNary High School	Keizer	Marion County	Salem-Keizer S.D.	2,081	Celtics	6A	Traditional
	Merlo Station High School	Beaverton	Washington County	Beaverton S.D.	457			Magnet
	Metropolitan Learning Center	Portland	Multnomah County	Portland Public Schools	443			Alternative
	Milwaukie Academy of the Arts	Milwaukie	Clackamas County	North Clackamas S.D.	312	Mustangs	3A	Magnet, charter
	Milwaukie High School	Milwaukie	Clackamas County	North Clackamas S.D.	904	Mustangs	5A	Traditional
	Mitchell School	Mitchell	Wheeler County	Mitchell S.D.	63	Loggers	1A	Traditional
	Mohawk High School	Marcola	Lane County	Marcola S.D.	137	Mustangs	1A	Traditional
	Molalla High School	Molalla	Clackamas County	Molalla River S.D.	763	Indians	4A	Traditional
	Monroe High School	Monroe	Benton County	Monroe S.D.	118	Dragons	2A	Traditional
	Monument School	Monument	Grant County	Monument S.D.	66	Tigers	1A	Traditional
	Mount Scott Alternative High School	Portland	Multnomah County	Portland Public Schools	160			Alternative
	Mountain View High School	Bend	Deschutes County	Bend-La Pine S.D.	1,221	Cougars	5A	Traditional
	Mountainside High School	Beaverton	Washington County	Beaverton S.D.	1,758	Mavericks	6A	Traditional
	Myrtle Point High School	Myrtle Point	Coos County	Myrtle Point S.D.	356	Bobcats	3A	Traditional
	Neah-Kah-Nie High School	Rockaway Beach	Tillamook County	Neah-Kah-Nie School S.D.	280	Pirates	3A	Traditional
	Nestucca High School	Cloverdale	Tillamook County	Nestucca Valley S.D.	162	Bobcats	2A	Traditional
	Network Charter School	Eugene	Lane County	Eugene S.D.	112			Charter
	New Bridge High School	Grants Pass	Josephine County	Three Rivers S.D.				Traditional
	New Urban High School	Milwaukie	Clackamas County	North Clackamas S.D.	144	Phoenixes		Magnet
	Newberg High School	Newberg	Yamhill County	Newberg S.D.	1,619	Tigers	6A	Traditional
	Newport High School	Newport	Lincoln County	Lincoln County S.D.	624	Cubs	4A	Traditional
	Nixya'awii Community School	Mission	Umatilla County	Pendleton S.D.	67	Golden Eagles	1A	Charter
	North Bend High School	North Bend	Deschutes County	North Bend S.D.	731	Bulldogs	4A	Traditional
	North Columbia Academy	Rainier	Columbia County	Rainier S.D.	29			Charter
	North Douglas High School	Drain	Douglas County	North Douglas S.D.	82	Warriors	2A	Traditional
	North Eugene Alternative High School	Eugene	Lane County	Eugene S.D.	39			Alternative
	North Eugene High School	Eugene	Lane County	Eugene S.D.	1,071	Highlander	5A	Traditional
	North Lake School	Silver Lake	Lake County	North Lake S.D.	233	Cowboys	1A	Traditional
	North Marion High School	Aurora	Marion County	North Marion S.D.	603	Huskies	4A	Traditional
	North Medford High School	Medford	Jackson County	Medford S.D.	1,701	Black Tornado	6A	Traditional
	North Salem High School	Salem	Marion County	Salem-Keizer S.D.	2,239	Vikings	6A	Traditional
	North Valley High School	Grants Pass	Josephine County	Three Rivers S.D.	427	Knights	3A	Traditional
	Nyssa High School	Nyssa	Malheur County	Nyssa S.D.	350	Bulldogs	3A	Traditional
	Oakland High School	Oakland	Douglas County	Oakland S.D.	221	Oakers	2A	Traditional
	Oak Street Campus	Hillsboro	Washington County	Hillsboro S.D.	70			Alternative
	Oakridge High School	Oakridge	Lane County	Oakridge S.D.	148	Warriors	2A	Traditional
	Ocean Dunes High School	Florence	Lane County	Oregon Youth Authority				State School
	Ontario High School	Ontario	Malheur County	Ontario S.D.	656	Tigers	4A	Traditional
	Opportunity Center	Eugene	Lane County	Eugene S.D.	145			Alternative
	Oregon City High School	Oregon City	Clackamas County	Oregon City S.D.	1,931	Pioneers	6A	Traditional
	Oregon City Service Learning Academy	Oregon City	Clackamas County	Oregon City S.D.	170	Phoenix		Alternative
	Oregon Coast Technology School	North Bend	Deschutes County	North Bend S.D.	369			Charter
	Oregon Connections Academy	Scio (virtual school)	N/A	Scio S.D.	1,473			Alternative
	Oregon School for the Deaf	Salem	Marion County	Oregon Department of Education	51	Panthers	1A	State School
	Pacific High School	Port Orford	Curry County	Port Orford-Langolois S.D.	59	Pirates	1A	Traditional
	Paisley School	Paisley	Lake County	Paisley S.D.	103	Broncos	1A	Traditional
	Parkrose High School	Portland	Multnomah County	Parkrose S.D.	998	Broncos	5A	Traditional
	Pendleton High School	Pendleton	Umatilla County	Pendleton S.D.	795	Buckaroos	4A	Traditional
	Perrydale High School	Perrydale	Polk County	Perrydale S.D.	91	Pirates	1A	Traditional
	Philomath High School	Philomath	Benton County	Philomath S.D.	418	Warriors	4A	Traditional
	Phoenix High School	Phoenix	Jackson County	Phoenix-Talent S.D.	670	Pirates	4A	Traditional
	Pilot Rock High School	Pilot Rock	Umatilla County	Pilot Rock S.D.	161	Rockets	2A	Traditional
	Pine Eagle Charter School	Halfway	Baker County	Pine Eagle S.D.	188	Spartans	1A	Charter
	Pioneer Secondary Alternative High School	Prineville	Crook County	Crook County S.D.	89			Alternative
	Pleasant Hill High School	Pleasant Hill	Lane County	Pleasant Hill S.D.	538	Billies	3A	Traditional
	Powder Valley School	North Powder	Union County	North Powder S.D.	269	Badgers	1A	Traditional
	Powers High School	Powers	Coos County	Powers S.D.	51	Cruisers	1A	Traditional
	Prairie City School	Prairie City	Grant County	Prairie City S.D.	163	Panthers	1A	Traditional
	Prospect Charter School	Prospect	Jackson County	Prospect S.D.	245	Cougars	1A	Charter
	Rainier Senior High School	Rainier	Columbia County	Rainier S.D.	449	Columbians	3A	Traditional
	Redmond High School	Redmond	Deschutes County	Redmond S.D.	928	Panthers	5A	Traditional
	Reedsport Community Charter School	Reedsport	Douglas County	Reedsport S.D.	160	Braves	2A	Charter
	Resource Link Charter School	Coos Bay	Coos County	Charter	50			Charter
	Rex Putnam High School	Milwaukie	Clackamas County	North Clackamas S.D.	1,106	Kingsmen	5A	Traditional
	Reynolds High School	Troutdale	Multnomah County	Reynolds S.D.	2,474	Raiders	6A	Traditional
	Reynolds Learning Academy	Fairview	Multnomah County	Reynolds S.D.	156	Dragons		Alternative
	Ridgeview High School	Redmond	Deschutes County	Redmond S.D.	936	Ravens	5A	Traditional
	Riddle High School	Riddle	Douglas County	Riddle S.D.	214	Irish	2A	Traditional
	RiverBend Alternative Education School	La Grande	Union County	Umatilla/Morrow Educational Service District	47			Alternative
	Riverdale High School	Portland	Multnomah County	Riverdale S.D.	185	Mavericks	3A	Traditional
	Riverside High School	Albany	Linn County	Multnomah Education Service District	Monarchs			Alternative
	Riverside Senior High School	Boardman	Morrow County	Morrow County S.D.	315	Pirates	3A	Traditional
	Roberts High School	Salem	Marion County	Salem-Keizer S.D.	1020			Alternative
	Rogue River High School	Rogue River	Jackson County	Rogue River S.D.	212	Chieftains	3A	Traditional
	Roosevelt High School	Portland	Multnomah County	Portland Public Schools	1,484	Roughriders	6A	Traditional
	Roseburg High School	Roseburg	Douglas County	Roseburg S.D.	1,674	Indians	6A	Traditional
	St. Helens High School	St. Helens	Columbia County	St. Helens S.D.	782	Lions	4A	Traditional
	Saint Paul High School	Saint Paul	Marion County	Saint Paul S.D.	103	Buckaroos	1A	Traditional
	Sam Barlow High School	Gresham	Multnomah County	Gresham-Barlow S.D.	1,710	Bruins	6A	Traditional
	Sandy High School	Sandy	Clackamas County	Oregon Trail S.D.	1,440	Pioneers	6A	Traditional
	Santiam Senior High School	Mill City	Linn County	Santiam Canyon S.D.	175	Wolverines	2A	Traditional
	Scappoose High School	Scappoose	Columbia County	Scappoose S.D.	656	Indians	4A	Traditional
	Scio High School	Scio	Linn County	Scio S.D.	218	Logger	2A	Traditional
	Seaside High School	Seaside	Clatsop County	Seaside S.D.	453	Seagulls	4A	Traditional
	Sheldon High School	Eugene	Lane County	Eugene S.D.	1,525	Irish	6A	Traditional
	Sheridan High School	Sheridan	Yamhill County	Sheridan S.D.	224	Spartans	3A	Traditional
	Sherman High School	Moro	Sherman County	Sherman County S.D.	136	Huskies	1A	Traditional
	Sherwood High School	Sherwood	Washington County	Sherwood S.D.	1,704	Bowmen	6A	Traditional
	Siletz Valley Early College Academy	Siletz	Lincoln County	Lincoln County S.D.	68	Warriors	1A	Charter
	Silverton High School	Silverton	Marion County	Silver Falls S.D.	1,238	Foxes	5A	Traditional
	Sisters High School	Sisters	Deschutes County	Sisters S.D.	399	Outlaws	3A	Traditional
	Siuslaw High School	Florence	Lane County	Siuslaw S.D.	459	Vikings	3A	Traditional
	South Albany High School	Albany	Linn County	Greater Albany Public S.D.	1,481	RedHawks	5A	Traditional
	South Eugene High School	Eugene	Lane County	Eugene S.D.	1,505	Axe	6A	Traditional
	South Medford High School	Medford	Jackson County	Medford S.D.	1,870	Panthers	6A	Traditional
	South Salem High School	Salem	Marion County	Salem-Keizer S.D.	2,256	Saxons	6A	Traditional
	South Umpqua High School	Myrtle Creek	Douglas County	South Umpqua S.D.	443	Lancers	3A	Traditional
	South Wasco County High School	Maupin	Wasco County	South Wasco County S.D.	126	Redsides	1A	Traditional
	Southridge High School	Beaverton	Washington County	Beaverton S.D.	1,495	Skyhawks	6A	Traditional
	Sprague High School	Salem	Marion County	Salem-Keizer S.D.	1,779	Olympians	6A	Traditional
	Spray School	Spray	Wheeler County	Spray S.D.	60	Eagles	1A	Traditional
	Springfield High School	Springfield	Lane County	Springfield S.D.	1,317	Millers	5A	Traditional
	Springwater Trail High School	Gresham	Multnomah County	Gresham-Barlow S.D.	167			Charter
	Stanfield Secondary School	Stanfield	Umatilla County	Stanfield S.D.	182	Tigers	2A	Traditional
	Stayton High School	Stayton	Marion County	North Santiam S.D.	697	Eagles	4A	Traditional
	Summit High School	Bend	Deschutes County	Bend-La Pine S.D.	1,444	Storm	5A	Traditional
	Sunset High School	Beaverton (Portland mailing address)	Washington County	Beaverton S.D.	1,962	Apollos	6A	Traditional
	Sutherlin High School	Sutherlin	Douglas County	Sutherlin S.D.	361	Bulldogs	3A	Traditional
	Sweet Home High School	Sweet Home	Linn County	Sweet Home S.D.	684	Huskies	4A	Traditional
	Taft High School	Lincoln City	Lincoln County	Lincoln County S.D.	464	Tigers	3A	Traditional
	Terra Nova High School	Portland	Multnomah County	Beaverton S.D. Northwest Regional Education Service District	700			Magnet
	Three Lakes High School	Albany	Linn County	Youth Corrections Education Program	65			State School
	Thurston High School	Springfield	Lane County	Springfield S.D.	1,277	Colts	5A	Traditional
	Tigard High School	Tigard	Washington County	Tigard-Tualatin S.D.	1,799	Tigers	6A	Traditional
	Tillamook High School	Tillamook	Tillamook County	Tillamook S.D.	723	Cheesemakers	4A	Traditional
	Toledo High School	Toledo	Lincoln County	Lincoln County S.D.	184	Boomers	2A	Traditional
	Trask River High School	Tillamook	Tillamook County	Youth Corrections Education Program	72			State School
	Triangle Lake Charter School	Blachly	Lane County	Blachly S.D.	153	Lakers	1A	Charter
	Tualatin High School	Tualatin	Washington County	Tigard-Tualatin S.D.	1,747	Timberwolves	6A	Traditional
	Ukiah High School	Ukiah	Umatilla County	Ukiah S.D.	44	Cougars	1A	Traditional
	Umatilla High School	Umatilla	Umatilla County	Umatilla S.D.	435	Vikings	3A	Traditional
	Union High School	Union	Union County	Union S.D.	236	Bobcats	2A	Traditional
	Vale High School	Vale	Malheur County	Vale S.D.	291	Vikings	3A	Traditional
	Vernonia High School	Vernonia	Columbia County	Vernonia S.D.	184	Loggers	2A	Traditional
	Waldport High School	Waldport	Lincoln County	Lincoln County S.D.	199	Irish	2A	Traditional
	Wallowa High School	Wallowa	Wallowa County	Wallowa S.D.	109	Cougars	1A	Traditional
	Warrenton High School	Warrenton	Clatsop County	Warrenton-Hammond S.D.	275	Warriors	3A	Traditional
	West Albany High School	Albany	Linn County	Greater Albany Public S.D.	1,250	Bulldogs	5A	Traditional
	West Lane Technology Learning Center	Elmira	Lane County	Fern Ridge S.D.	76			Charter
	West Linn High School	West Linn	Linn County	West Linn-Wilsonville S.D.	1,905	Lions	6A	Traditional
	West Salem High School	Salem	Marion County	Salem-Keizer S.D.	1,733	Titans	6A	Traditional
	Weston-McEwen High School	Athena	Umatilla County	Athena Weston S.D.	215	TigerScots	2A	Traditional
	Westview High School	Beaverton (Portland mailing address)	Washington County	Beaverton S.D.	2,442	Wildcats	6A	Traditional
	Wheeler High School	Fossil	Wheeler County	Fossil S.D.	39	Knights	1A	Traditional
	Wilderness Charter School	Ashland	Jackson County	Ashland S.D.	22			Charter
	Willamina High School	Willamina	Yamhill County	Willamina S.D.	308	Bulldogs	2A	Traditional
	Willamette High School	Eugene	Lane County	Bethel S.D.	996	Wolverines	6A	Traditional
	Willamette Leadership Academy	Eugene	Lane County	Springfield S.D.	120			Charter (Military)
	Wilsonville High School	Wilsonville	Linn County	West Linn-Wilsonville S.D.	1,269	Wildcats	5A	Traditional
	Winston Churchill High School	Eugene	Lane County	Eugene S.D.	1,082	Lancers	5A	Traditional
	Winter Lakes High School	Coquille	Coos County	Coquille S.D.		White Wolves		Alternative
	William P. Lord High School	Woodburn	Marion County	Youth Corrections Education Program	366			State School
	Woodburn High School	Woodburn	Marion County	Woodburn S.D.	1,716	Bulldogs	5A	Traditional
	Woodburn Success Alternative High School	Woodburn	Marion County	Woodburn S.D.	184			Alternative
	Yamhill Carlton High School	Yamhill	Yamhill County	Yamhill-Carlton S.D.	292	Tigers	3A	Traditional
	Yoncalla High School	Yoncalla	Douglas County	Yoncalla S.D.	214	Eagles	2A	Traditional

=== Private schools ===
Image	Name	City	District	Enrollment	Team name	OSAA classification
	Blanchet Catholic School	Salem	Private	200	Cavaliers	2A
	Cascade Christian High School	Medford	Private	256	Challengers	3A
	Catlin Gabel School	West Haven-Sylvan	Private	320	Eagles	3A
	Central Catholic High School	Portland	Private	859	Rams	6A
	Central Christian Schools	Portland	Private	86	Knights	1A
	Columbia Christian Schools	Redmond	Private	236	Tigers	1A
	Country Christian School	Molalla	Private	54	Cougars	1A
	C. S. Lewis Academy	Newberg	Private	28	Watchmen	1A
	Damascus Christian School	Damascus	Private	67	Eagles	1A
	De La Salle North Catholic High School	Portland	Private	277	Knights	3A
	The Delphian School	Sheridan	Private	149	Dragons	2A
	East Linn Christian Academy	Lebanon	Private	108	Eagles	2A
	Emerald Christian Academy	Pleasant Hill	Private	115	Roadrunners	
	Faith Bible High School	Hillsboro	Private	187	Falcons	2A
	Hosanna Christian School	Klamath Falls	Private	320	Lions	1A
	Horizon Christian School	Hood River	Private	169	Hawks	1A
	Horizon Christian Schools	Tualatin	Private	123	Hawks	3A
	Jesuit High School	Beaverton (Portland mailing address)	Private	1,276	Crusaders	6A
	La Salle Catholic College Preparatory	Milwaukie	Private	630	Falcons	5A
	Laurelwood Academy	Jasper	Private	43		
	Life Christian School	Aloha	Private	35	Lions	1A
	Lifegate Christian School	Eugene	Private	63	Lions	1A
	Livingstone Adventist Academy	Salem	Private	57		1A
	Looking Glass Riverfront School and Career Center	Eugene	Private	90		
	Mannahouse Christian Academy	Portland	Private	117	Lions	1A
	Marist Catholic High School	Eugene	Private	436	Spartans	4A
	Mid-Valley Christian Academy	Monmouth	Private	71	Navigators	1A
	Milo Adventist Academy	Days Creek	Private	122	Mustangs	2A
	New Hope Christian Schools	Grants Pass	Private	69	Warriors	1A
	North Clackamas Christian School	Oregon City	Private	74	Saints	1A
	The Northwest Academy	Portland	Private	112	Angry Pigeons	
	Oak Hill School	Eugene	Private	131	Falcons	1A
	Open Door Christian Academy	Troutdale	Private	58	Huskies	1A
	Oregon Episcopal School	Raleigh Hills	Private	314	Aardvarks	3A
	Pacific Crest Community School	Portland	Private	95	Goats	
	Portland Adventist Academy	Portland	Private	217	Cougars	3A
	Portland Christian School	Portland	Private	155	Royals	2A
	Portland Lutheran School	Portland	Private	230	Blue Jays	1A
	Portland Waldorf School	Milwaukie	Private	66	Wolfpack	1A
	Regis High School	Stayton	Private	141	Rams	2A
	Rogue Valley Adventist School	Medford	Private	130	Red Tail Hawks	1A
	Rosemary Anderson High School	Portland	Private	190		
	St. Mary's Academy	Portland	Private	610	Blues	6A
	St. Stephen's Academy	Beaverton	Private	51	Archers	1A
	Saint Mary's School	Medford	Private	328	Crusaders	3A
	Salem Academy Christian Schools	Salem	Private	163	Crusaders	2A
	Santiam Christian School	Adair Village	Private	245	Eagles	3A
	Southwest Christian School	Beaverton	Private	39	Wildcats	1A
	Treasure Valley Christian School	Ontario	Private	44	Warriors	
	Triad School	Klamath Falls	Private	257	Timber Wolves	1A
	Trinity Lutheran School	Bend	Private	340	Saints	1A
	Tualatin Valley Academy	Hillsboro	Private	200	Eagles	1A
	Umpqua Valley Christian Secondary School	Winston	Private	110	Monarchs	1A
	Valley Catholic School	Beaverton	Private	370	Valiants	3A
	Valor Christian School International	Beaverton	Private	42	Knights	1A
	Veritas School	Newberg	Private		Vanguard	1A
	Wellsprings Friends School	Eugene	Private	60		
	Western Christian School	Salem	Private	81	Pioneers	2A
	Westside Christian High School	Lake Oswego	Private	185	Eagles	3A
	Willamette Valley Christian High School	Brooks	Private	62	Warriors	1A

== Defunct ==
Image	Name	City	District	Opened	Closed	Team name
	Adams High School	Portland	Portland Public Schools	1969	1982	Patriots
	Alpha High School	Gresham	Multnomah Education Service District		2015	
	Alvadore School	Alvadore		1915		
	Arts & Technology High School	Wilsonville	West Linn-Wilsonville S.D.	2005	2022	
	Canyonville Christian Academy	Canyonville	Private	1924		Pilots
	Cascade Locks School	Cascade Locks	Hood River County S.D.	1949	2009	Pirates
	Centennial Park School	Portland	Centennial S.D.	1993	2020	
	Central Medford High School	Medford	Medford S.D.	197	2020	Owls
	Crook County Christian School	Prineville	Private	1994	2010	Warriors
	Durham Education Center	Tigard	Tigard-Tualatin S.D.		2019	
	Edwin Brown High School	Redmond	Redmond S.D.	1998	2009	
	Fairview Christian School	Albany	Private	1975	2009	
	Heritage Christian School	Hillsboro	Private	1998	2009	Knights
	Jackson High School	Portland	Portland Public Schools	1966	1982	Raiders
	Jacksonville High School	Jacksonville	Jacksonville S.D.		1959	Indians
	Marshall High School	Portland	Portland Public Schools	1960	2011	Minutemen
	Mount Bachelor Academy	Prineville	Private	1987	2009	Bears
	Monroe High School	Portland	Portland Public Schools	1928	1978	
	Oregon School for the Blind	Salem	Oregon Department of Education	1873	2009	
	Pleasant View School	Milton-Freewater	Milton-Freewater S.D.	1994	2014	
	Riddle Education Center	Riddle	Riddle S.D.		2014	
	Robert S. Farrell High School	Salem	Youth Corrections Education Program		2017	
	Rosemont School	Portland	Portland Public Schools	1902	2014	
	Sheridan Japanese School	Sheridan	Sheridan S.D. (charter school)	1994	2022	Koi
	South Jetty High School	Warrenton	Youth Corrections Education Program		2017	
	Trillium Charter School	Portland	Portland Public Schools	2001	2019	
	Washington High School	Portland	Portland Public Schools	1906	1981	Colonials

== See also ==
- List of school districts in Oregon
- Lists of Oregon-related topics
