= Alpha High School (Gresham, Oregon) =

Defunct public alternative high school

Location
- 876 NE 8th Street; Gresham, (Multnomah County), Oregon 97030; United States
- Coordinates: 45.502851°N 122.421325°W

Information
- Type: Public
- School district: Multnomah Education Service District
- Principal: Peter Kane
- Grades: 7-12
- Enrollment: 48
- Website: Alpha HS website

Alpha High School was a public alternative high school in Gresham, Oregon, United States. It specialized in school-to-work transition programs. It closed in 2015 due to reduced enrollment; declining demand resulted especially from improved programs at the Gresham-Barlow School District reducing student expulsions and the requirement for the alternative high school.
