= Riverside High School (Albany, Oregon) =

Youth correctional education facility in Oregon

Location
- 4400 Lochner Rd SE; Albany, (Linn County), Oregon 97322; United States; 44.60214013936655°N 123.0952459421982°W

Information
- Type: Public
- Motto: Onward and Upward
- School district: Multnomah Education Service District; OED YCEP
- Principal: Joy Koenig
- Grades: 10-12
- Enrollment: 5 (2019—2020)
- Mascot: Riverside Monarchs
- Website: Riverside HS website

Riverside High School is girl's correctional education program housed adjacent to the Oak Creek Youth Correctional Facility in Albany, Oregon, USA. Riverside hosts the Young Women’s Transition Program (YWTP). The school is affiliated with four districts; Linn-Benton Lincoln Education Service District (ESD) and Lane ESD are due to location but the program is overseen by the Oregon Department of Education Youth Corrections Education Program (YCEP) and Multnomah Education Service District (MSED). Riverside is paired with Ocean Dunes High School in Florence, Oregon and Three Lakes High School and the Linn-Benton Juvenile Detention Center, which are also located within Oak Creek. The program moved from Corvallis, Oregon to Albany in 2016.

== Students ==
Students at Riverside are girls ages 15 to 25 who are moving from a youth correctional facility back into the community. YWTP is a more self-led facility that encourages students to play a larger role in their correctional progress while still being under supervision. The facilities can accommodate up to 14 students at a time.

== Academics ==
Riverside students can earn their high school diploma, GED, vocational education/certification, college credits, associate's degree, or bachelor's degree. In 2020, Riverside and Three Lakes saw 25 students graduate with their high school diploma or GED and 3 with their associate's degree.

Riverside strives to give its students vocational skills such as driving forklifts and tractors (including snow-clearing), heavy equipment training, brickwork, flagging, first aid, culinary certifications, CTECH, blueprint reading, construction/handywork, technical writing, fabrication, and welding, which might expand their job opportunities. They also learn resume writing, financial planning, and interviewing skills.

Baker Technical Institute, Linn–Benton Community College, the Oregon Department of Education, and Girls Build are frequent collaborators with the school.
