= Multnomah Education Service District =

Education service district in Oregon, United States

Coordinates: 45°33′58.13″N 122°32′28.78″W

Multnomah Education Service District (MESD) is an education service district that coordinates school events and activities throughout the school districts in Multnomah County, Oregon, United States. Its administrative offices are located at 11611 NE Ainsworth Circle in Portland.

== Administration ==
The superintendent is Dr. Paul Coakley.

== Districts ==
MESD operates through several school districts:

- Centennial School District
- Corbett School District
- David Douglas School District
- Gresham-Barlow School District
- Parkrose School District
- Portland Public Schools
- Reynolds School District
- Riverdale School District

== Schools ==
MESD also directly operates several schools:

- Arata Creek School - Troutdale
- Burlingame Creek School - Gresham
- Four Creeks School - Portland
- Helensview High School - Portland
- Knott Creek School - Portland
- Riverside High School - Albany
- Wheatley School - Portland

== Outdoor School ==
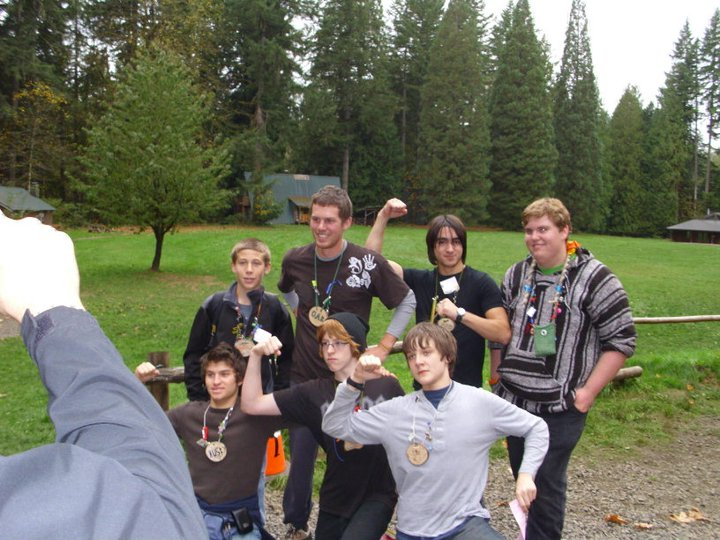
Outdoor School high-school counselors with their "wood-cookie" name-tags

MESD also operates the Outdoor School environmental education program, serving roughly 7,000 6th-graders and 1,600 high-schoolers from throughout Multnomah County annually.

== Anti-gay discrimination and retaliation ==
In 2015, the Oregon Bureau of Labor and Industries found MESD to have engaged in discrimination and retaliation against Brett Bigham, the 2014 Oregon Teacher of the Year, for being public about his sexual orientation. Brigham eventually agreed to a $140,000 settlement with the district.

== See also ==
- List of school districts in Oregon
