= Cascade Locks School =

Public school in Oregon, United States

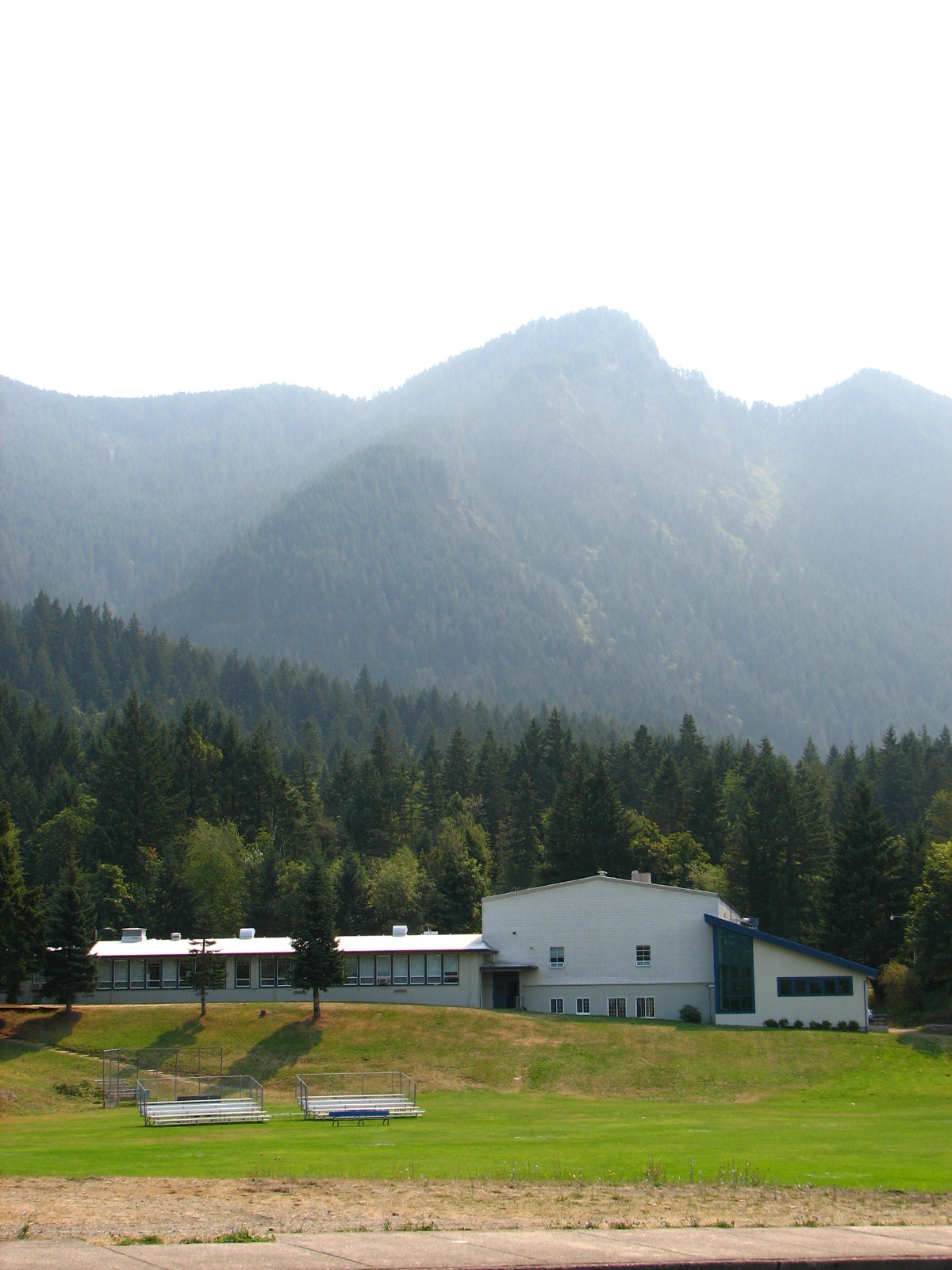

Location
- 300 Wa-na-pa Street; Cascade Locks, (Hood River County), Oregon 97014; United States; 45.667329°N 121.89213°W

Information
- Type: Public
- School district: Hood River County School District
- Principal: Ed Drew
- Grades: K-5
- Colors: Royal blue and gold
- Mascot: Pirate
- Website: Cascade Locks School

Cascade Locks School is a public school in Cascade Locks, Oregon, United States. Opened in 1949, the school included high school grades until 2009. The school includes grades K through 5.

== History ==
In 2008, 57% of the school's seniors received a high school diploma. Of 14 students, eight graduated, four dropped out, and two were still in high school the following year.

When it had high school grades, the school was part of the Oregon School Activities Association at the 1A level in the Big Sky League.

In 2007, the high school fielded a football team for the first time in nearly 20 years.
