= Centennial Learning Center =

Location
- 17630 SE Main Street; Portland, Oregon 97233; United States
- Coordinates: 45.51237°N 122.481441°W

Information
- Type: Public
- Closed: June 2020
- School district: Centennial School District
- Principal: Jamie Juenemann
- Grades: 7-12
- Enrollment: 136
- Website: www.centennial.k12.or.us/schools/clc

Centennial Learning Center is a public alternative high school in Gresham, Oregon, United States.

== Academics ==
In 2008, 27% of the school's seniors received their high school diploma. Of 44 students, 12 graduated, 17 dropped out, and 15 were still in high school in 2009.
