= Paisley School District =

Paisley School
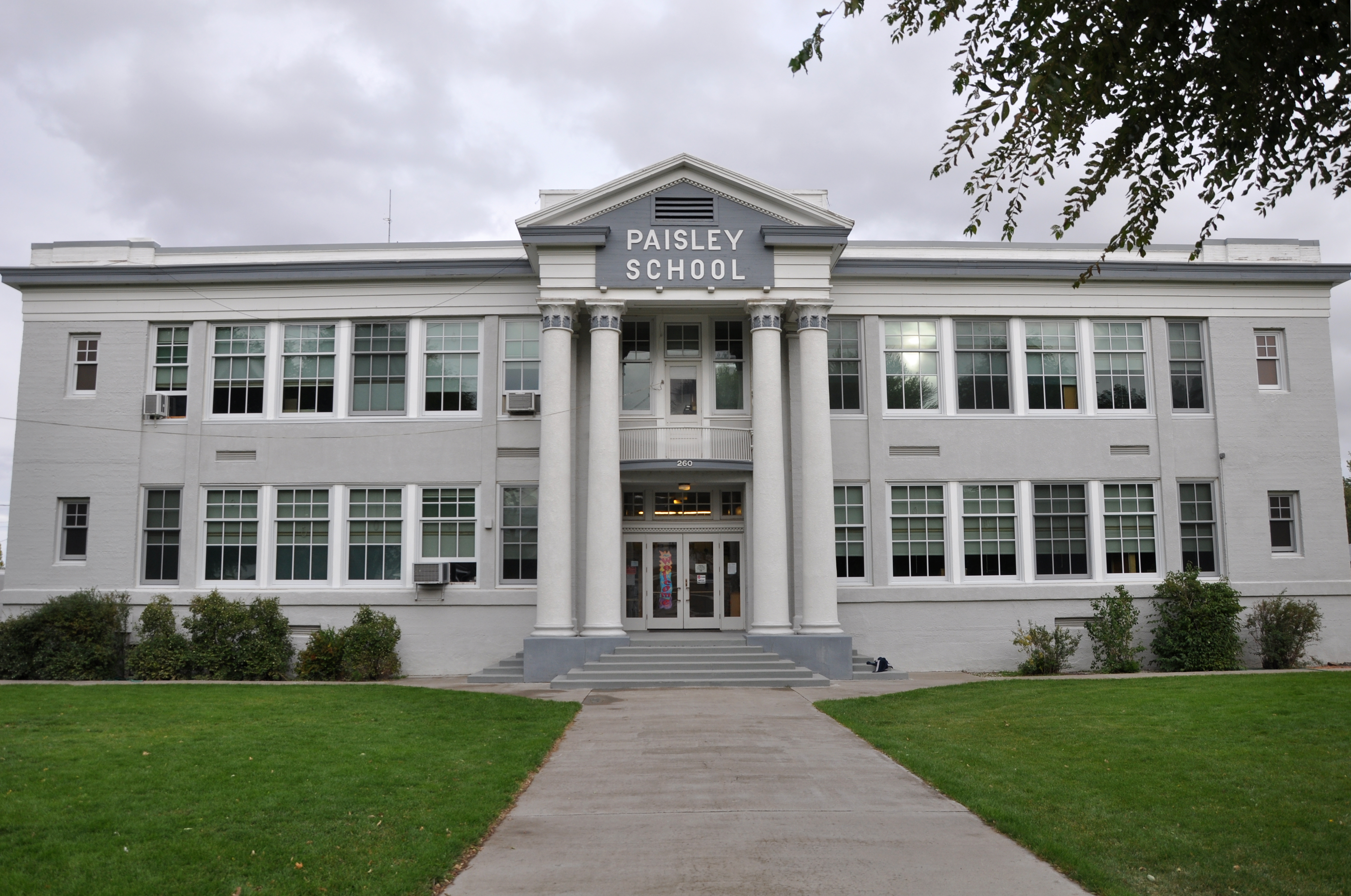

Location
- 260 Green Street; Paisley, (Lake County), Oregon 97636; United States
- Coordinates: 42.69337°N 120.542931°W

Information
- Type: Public
- School district: Paisley School District
- Principal: Paul Hauder
- Grades: K-12
- Enrollment: 64
- Colors: Maroon and white
- Athletics conference: OSAA Mountain Valley League 1A-5
- Mascot: Bronco
- Website: www.paisleyschooldistrict.com

Paisley School is a public charter school in Paisley, Oregon, United States. It serves students from kindergarten through twelfth grade (K-12). It is the only school in the Paisley School District 11C, and contains a boarding facility, which houses international students and domestic students for the high school.

Free lunch is provided daily and is heavily sponsored by local churches and private Donations as well as assistance from the community.

The campus consists of the primary school house, a separate line of school rooms, a gymnasium, a cafeteria, playground with outdoor basketball courts. Inside the main school house is the school library and in the upper level a student run, teacher managed radio station KPAI-LP (103.1FM) which provides the community with radio services.

Paisley, along with Lakeview High School, takes high students from Adel and Plush.

== Academics ==
In 2008, 100% of the school's seniors received a high school diploma. Of two students, two graduated and none dropped out. The average class size for graduating classes is 3-4 students.

== Campus ==
The dormitory opened, initially only housing US residents outside of Oregon, in temporary facilities in 1995 with its current one opening in 1996. In 1998 it began housing foreign exchange students. The Collins-McDonald Boarding Facility has female students upstairs.

== See also ==
- List of high schools in Oregon
