= Oregon Connections Academy =

Location
- 740 Overholt Ave; Prairie City, Grant, Oregon 97869; United States

Information
- Type: Public Charter School
- Opened: 2020
- School district: Prairie City School District
- Educational authority: Oregon Department of Education
- CEEB code: 380066
- School Leader: Janel Scurlock
- Grades: K–12
- Enrollment: 1080
- Colors: purple, aqua, white
- Mascot: Ollie the Owl
- Accreditation: Cognia
- Website: https://orconnectionsacademy.wixsite.com/orca

Oregon Connections Academy is a tuition–free K–12 online public school affiliated with the Prairie City School District in Prairie City, Oregon, United States. The school is operated by Oregon Connections Academy, a nonprofit corporation, through a contract with Connections Academy of Oregon, LLC dba Pearson Online & Blended Learning to provide its educational program and other services. The school is governed by an independent board of directors, and all board meetings are open to the public.

== School profile ==
Oregon Connections Academy, which opened in 2020, is a full-time, tuition-free, K–12 online public school.

== Academics ==
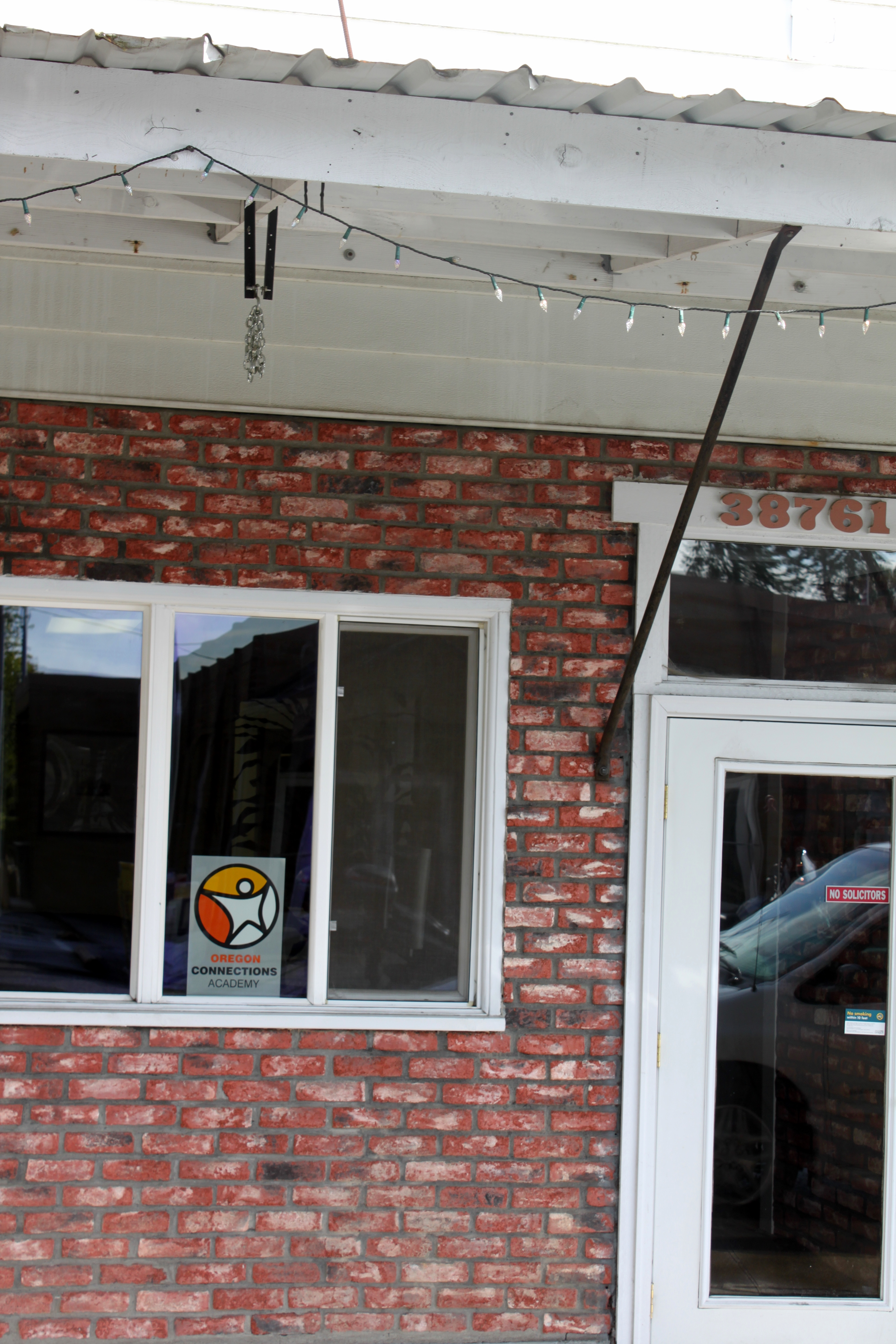
Logo and door at entrance to Oregon Connections Academy

The academic record of Connections Academy in other states was called "spotty" by The Oregonian in 2005, comparing the 1:50 teacher:student ratio to the 1:20 ratio of the Clackamas Web Academy.

== Location ==
The academy office is located in an office in Prairie City, Oregon. Since the school is online, the physical location is largely a matter of formality, and does not reflect the physical location of the school's servers, instructors, etc. The school lists the location as its administrative office, but students from across the state are eligible to attend.
