= Reynolds Learning Academy =

Location
- 20234 NE Halsey Street; Fairview, Multnomah County, Oregon 97024; United States
- Coordinates: 45.532938°N 122.455339°W

Information
- Type: Public
- School district: Reynolds School District
- Principal: Aaron Ferguson
- Grades: 9-12
- Enrollment: 156
- Mascot: Dragons
- Website: www.reynolds.k12.or.us/rla

Reynolds Learning Academy is a public alternative school in Fairview, Oregon, United States.

== Academics ==
In 2008, 46% of the school's seniors received their high school diploma. Of 74 students, 34 graduated, 20 dropped out, 2 received a modified diploma, and 18 are still in high school.

In October 2009 the school was placed on the No Child Left Behind safety watch list, "because more than 1 percent of their students brought a weapon to school, were expelled for violence or committed a violent crime on campus."

The distinctive appearance and prominent location of this academy makes it the signature building for Reynolds School District's main campus. It houses nontraditional high school programs.

The two-story building is organized around a clerestory-topped atrium. The 15 classrooms include two science rooms, a creative-arts lab, and a landscaping work/study lab.
