= Douglas Avenue Alternative School =

Location
- 300 E Douglas Avenue; Gervais, Marion County, Oregon 97026; United States
- Coordinates: 45.103608°N 122.893906°W

Information
- Type: Public
- School district: Gervais School District
- Principal: Mike Solem
- Grades: 9-12
- Enrollment: 16
- Website: https://www.gervais.k12.or.us/o/ghs

Douglas Avenue Alternative School is a public alternative high school in Gervais, Oregon, United States. It is located on the campus of Gervais High School.

== Academics ==
In 2008, 60% of the school's seniors received their high school diploma. Of 15 students, nine graduated, four dropped out, and two were still in high school.
