= Opportunity Center =

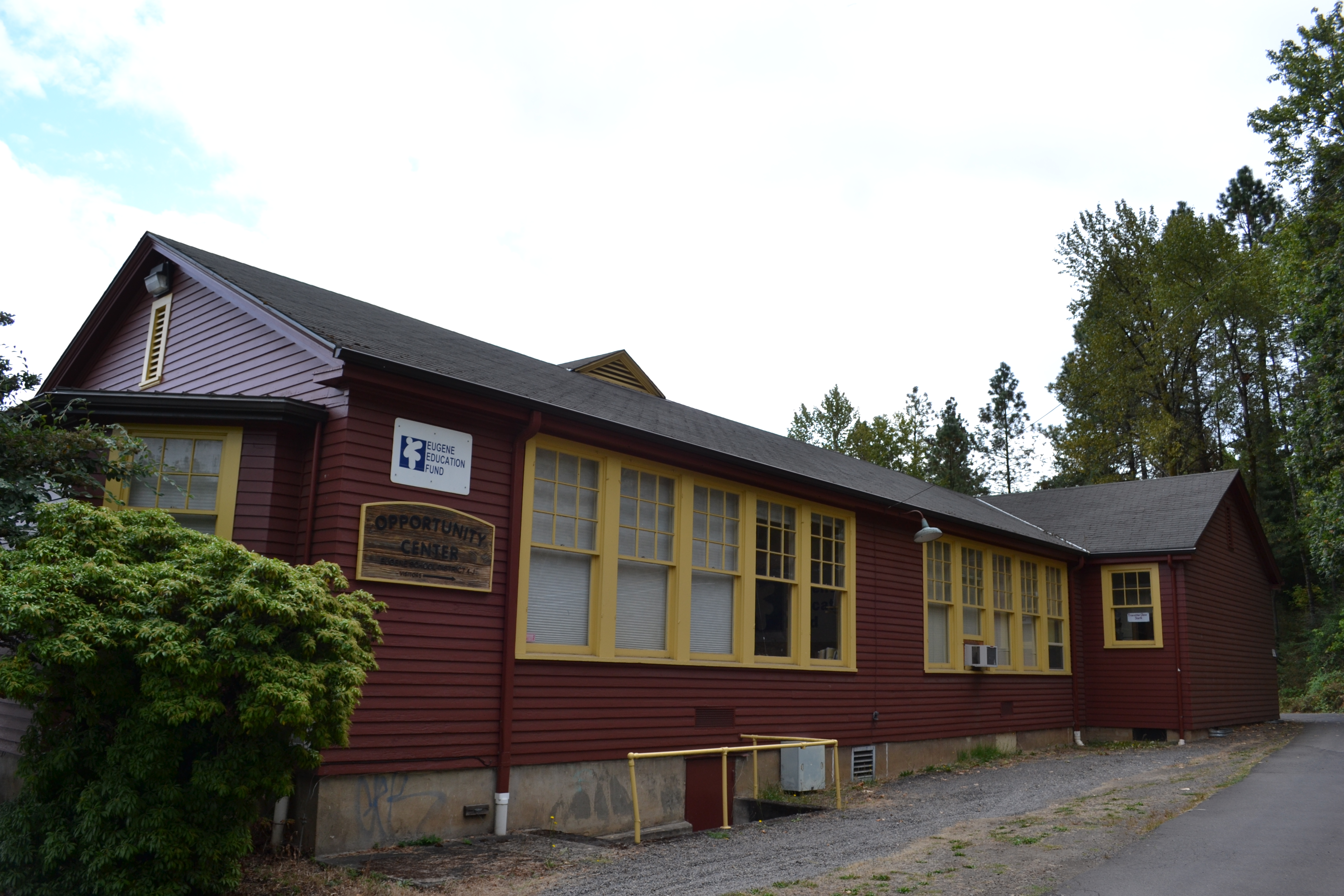

Location
- 3411-B Willamette Street; Eugene, Lane County, Oregon; United States
- Coordinates: 44.018832°N 123.091282°W

Information
- Type: Public
- Opened: 1971
- School district: Eugene School District
- Principal: Brad New
- Grades: 9-12
- Enrollment: 145
- Website: www.4j.lane.edu/schools/opportunity

Opportunity Center is a public alternative high school in Eugene, Oregon, United States.

== History ==
Opportunity Center was an alternative high school program in Eugene, Oregon, until it was consolidated with other district alternative programs in the early 2010s.

In 1983, the center's first two graduates Richard Reed and Beverly Meyers, received their GED from Lane Community College.

== Academics ==
In 2008, 43% of the school's seniors received their high school diploma. Of 69 students, 30 graduated, 19 dropped out, and 20 are still in high school.
