= Mid-Valley Christian Academy =

Location
- 1483 N 16th Street; Monmouth, Polk County, Oregon 97361; United States
- Coordinates: 44.863257°N 123.210441°W

Information
- Type: Private
- Principal: Gaye Stewart
- Grades: Pre-12
- Colors: Blue and gold
- Athletics conference: OSAA Casco League 1A-2
- Mascot: Navigators
- Affiliation: Christian
- Website: www.midvalca.org
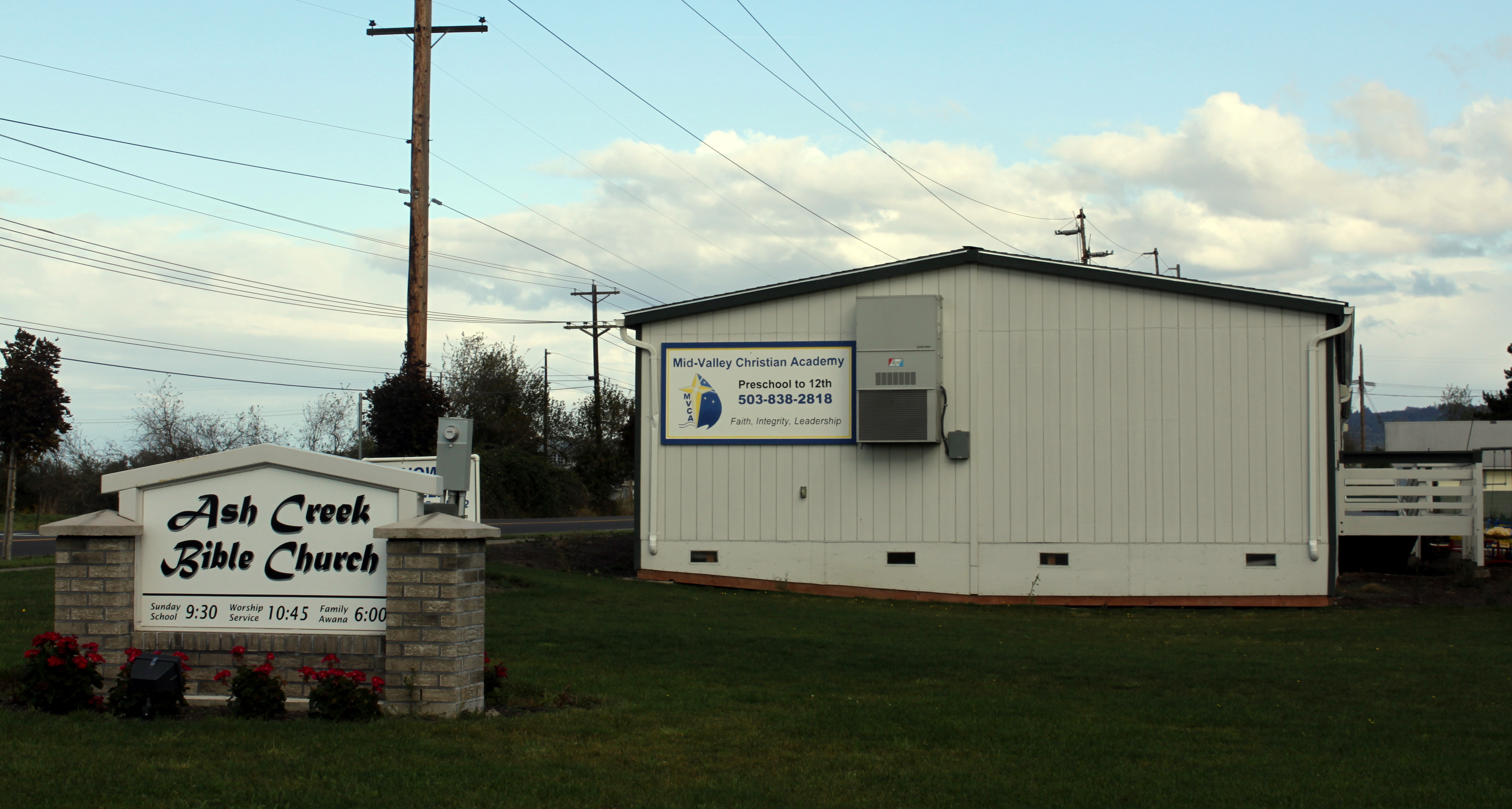

Mid-Valley Christian Academy was a private Christian school in Monmouth, Oregon, United States. It was located at the Ash Creek Bible Church.
