= North Eugene Alternative High School =

Location
- 200 Silver Lane; Eugene, Lane County, Oregon 97404; United States; 44.09495°N 123.13099°W

Information
- Type: Public
- School district: Eugene School District
- Principal: Brad New
- Grades: 9-12
- Enrollment: 39
- Website: www.4j.lane.edu/schools/northalt

North Eugene Alternative High School was a public alternative high school in Eugene, Oregon, United States. It was located on the campus of North Eugene High School and closed in 2012.

== Academics ==
In 2008, 54% of the school's seniors received their high school diploma. Of 37 students, 20 graduated, 7 dropped out, 2 received a modified diploma, and 8 are still in high school.
