= Destinations Academy =

Location
- 1255 Hemlock Ave. Coos Bay, Coos County, Oregon 97420; United States
- Coordinates: 43.362019°N 124.219328°W

Information
- Type: Public
- Principal: Linda Vickrey
- Grades: 9-12
- Enrollment: 50

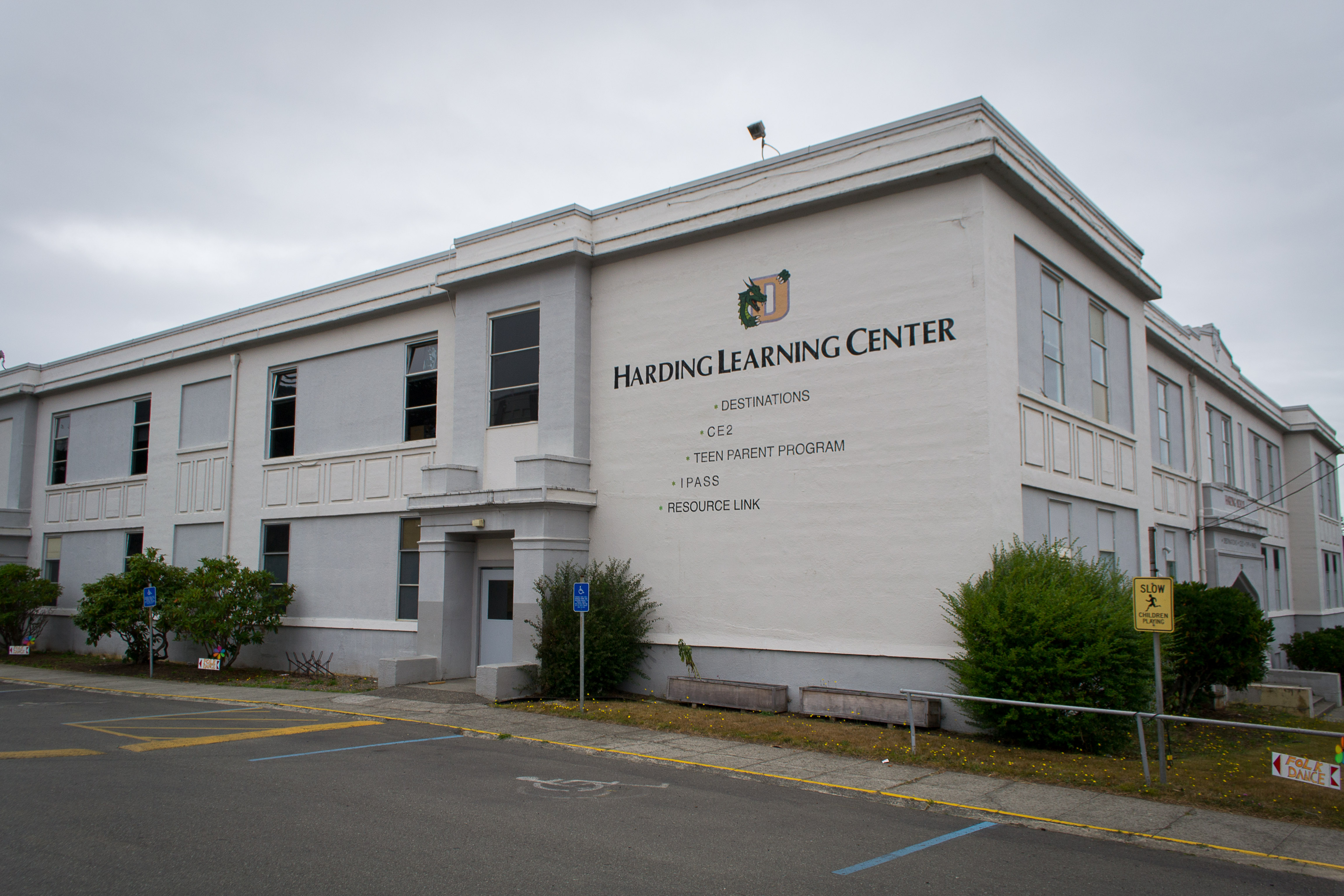
Former location pre-2019

Destinations Academy is a public alternative high school in Coos Bay, Oregon, United States, located at 1255 Hemlock.

== Academics ==
In 2008, 29% of the school's seniors received their high school diploma. Of 35 students, 10 graduated, 21 dropped out, and 4 are still in high school.
