= Blue Mountain Alternative High School =

Location
- 116 NW Bridge Street #8; John Day, (Grant County), Oregon 97845; United States
- Coordinates: 44.4171°N 118.9546°W

Information
- Type: Public
- School district: John Day School District
- Head teacher: Crish Lydon
- Grades: 7-12
- Enrollment: 32

Blue Mountain Alternative High School is a public alternative high school in John Day, Oregon, United States.

== Academics ==
In 2008, 53% of the school's seniors received a high school diploma. Of 15 students, eight graduated, two dropped out, one received a modified diploma, and four were still in high school the following year.
