= South Jetty High School =

Location
- 1250 SE 19th Street; Warrenton, (Clatsop County), Oregon 97146; United States; 46.143043°N 123.906684°W

Information
- Type: Public
- School district: Youth Corrections Education Program
- Grades
- Enrollment: 0

South Jetty High School was a public high school in Warrenton, Oregon, United States. It was located at the North Coast Youth Correctional Facility, which closed down in 2017.
