= Pleasant View School (Milton-Freewater, Oregon) =

Location
- 52274 Pleasant View; Milton-Freewater, Umatilla County, Oregon 97862; United States; 45.961687°N 118.449534°W

Information
- Type: Public
- School district: Milton-Freewater Unified School District
- Principal: Scott Lathrop
- Grades: 5-12
- Enrollment: 100
- Website: Pleasant View HS website

Pleasant View School, also known as Pleasantview High School, is a public alternative high school in Milton-Freewater, Oregon, United States.

== Academics ==
In 2008, 31% of the school's seniors received their high school diploma. Of 49 students, 15 graduated, 18 dropped out, and 16 are still in high school.

According to the Union-Bulletin, Pleasant View School will be closed due to costly repairs and loss of money.
