= Fairview Christian School =

Location
- 35100 Goltra Rd SE; Albany, Linn County, Oregon 97322; United States; 44.601008°N 123.008831°W

Information
- Type: Private
- Opened: 1975
- Closed: 2009
- Grades: K-12
- Gender: Coeducational
- Enrollment: 75
- Affiliation: Mennonite

Fairview Christian School was a private Mennonite school in Albany, Oregon, United States. Opened in 1975, the school was run by the Fairview Mennonite Church. The school moved to a new building in 1984, and closed in May 2009.
