= Connections Alternative School =

Location
- 129 N Platt; Eagle Point, (Jackson County), Oregon 97524; United States
- Coordinates: 42.472239°N 122.804532°W

Information
- Type: Public
- School district: Eagle Point School District
- Principal: Allen Barber
- Grades: 9-12
- Enrollment: 84

Connections Alternative School is a public alternative high school in Eagle Point, Oregon, United States.

== Academics ==
In 2008, 9% of the school's seniors received a high school diploma. Of 33 students, three graduated, 17 dropped out, and 13 were still in high school the following year.
