= Hosanna Christian School =

Location
- 5000 Hosanna Way; Klamath Falls, Klamath County, Oregon 97603; United States
- Coordinates: 42.179895°N 121.731557°W

Information
- Type: Private school
- Principal: Don Wonsley
- Grades: Pre K-12
- Enrollment
- Color
- Athletics conference: OSAA Mountain Valley League 1A-5
- Mascot
- Accreditation: ACSI, NAAS
- Affiliation: Christian
- Website: www.hosannachristian.org

Hosanna Christian School is a private Christian school in Klamath Falls, Oregon, United States of America.

== Academics ==
The school has been accredited by the Association of Christian Schools International since 1989, and by the Northwest Association of Accredited Schools since 1996.
