= Ashland School District (Oregon) =

School district in Oregon, USA

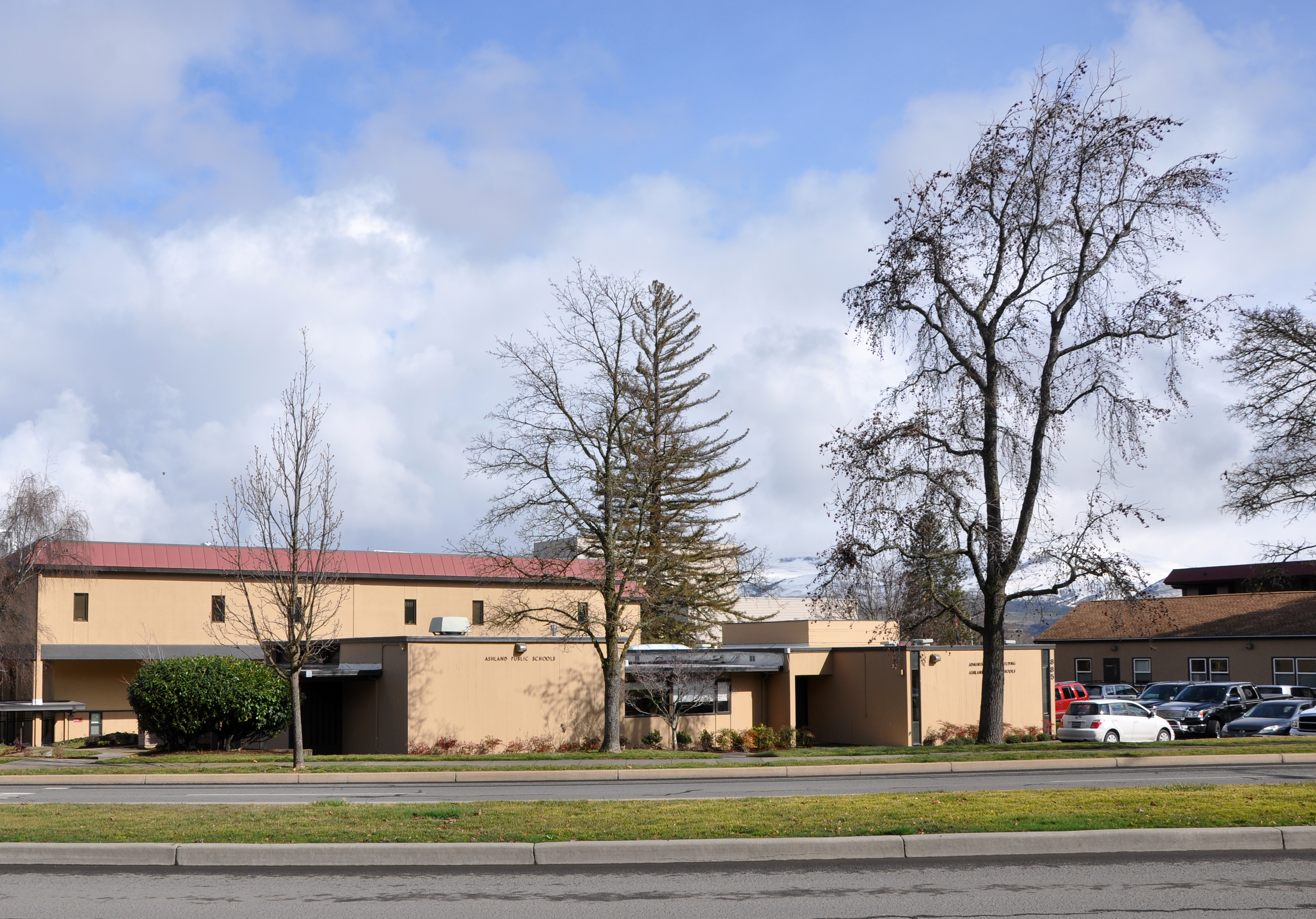

Location
- 885 Siskiyou Blvd. Ashland, (Jackson County), Oregon, 97520; United States

District information
- Grades: K-12
- Superintendent: Julie Di Chiro
- Schools: 8
- NCES District ID: 4101560

Students and staff
- Students: 3,040

Other information
- Website: www.ashland.k12.or.us

The Ashland School District (#5) is a public school district that serves the city of Ashland, Oregon, United States. As of 2009, there were approximately 3,000 students and 300 employees in the district.

The district includes the city limits of Ashland.

== Administration ==
- Superintendent: Joseph Hattrick

== Primary schools ==
- Bellview Elementary School
- Helman Elementary School
- Walker Elementary School

== Secondary schools ==
Ashland's secondary schools include grades 6 through 8.

=== Ashland Middle School ===
Ashland Middle School

Location
- Coordinates: 42.192639°N 122.68670600000002°W

Ashland Middle School is the only public middle school located in Ashland, and has 623 students and 81 staff members. The school includes grades 6–8. The 2012 Oregon Report Card from the Oregon Department of Education rated Ashland Middle School as "outstanding".

In 2013, at 11:06 am, May 14, a fire broke out in the south wing of the school. Smoke was reported to be coming from the boys' bathroom. Investigators said an arsonist had started the fire. The school was cleared by 12:45, and students were let back into the north building. The student who started the fire was identified, and the Jackson County District Attorney's Office Juvenile Department handled the case.

In November 2014, an epidemic of chickenpox broke out at Ashland Middle School. 20 students were reported to have chickenpox, including two cases of pertussis. Only about 70% of students attending Ashland Middle School were vaccinated as of 2013.

== High schools ==
- Ashland High School

== Alternative schools ==
- TRAILS Outdoor School (K-8)
- Wilderness Charter School
- Willow Wind Community Learning Center

== Demographics ==
In the 2009 school year, the district had 62 students classified as homeless by the Department of Education, which was 2.1% of students in the district.

=== Teacher and student numbers ===
- Total students: 3,040
- Classroom teachers: 150.8 (FTE)
- Student/teacher ratio: 20.2

== Drug testing controversy ==
In late 2001, Ashland School Board enacted a controversial drug and alcohol policy for leadership students. The local Oregon chapter of the American Civil Liberties Union had advocated on behalf of various students expelled by the Ashland School District for drug use in May 2001 at a national forensics tournament, and rallied again to protect the students from an unconstitutional invasion of their privacy. This landmark battle for students' rights was the first of many similar incidents across the country.

Students at Ashland High School argued that their off-campus behavior after school hours should have no effect on their academic standing. In a statement to the local press, Ashland High School Student Body Co-president Brady Brim-DeForest said, "Teaching kids not to use and abuse drugs and alcohol is a family thing. Ultimately, it's a student's own personal choice."

Eventually, the code of conduct was rewritten and the controversy led to a full-scale re-evaluation of the school district's drug and alcohol policy. In order to reach consensus, a community committee was formed, which met consecutively for five months.

=== Drug policy references ===
- Daily Tidings (February 2002 coverage)
- Daily Tidings (January 2002 coverage)
- Daily Tidings (January 2002 coverage)
- Daily Tidings (January 2002 coverage)
- Daily Tidings (January 2002 coverage)
- Mail Tribune (January 2002 coverage)
- Mail Tribune (October 2001 coverage) article 1
- Mail Tribune (October 2001 coverage) article 2
- Daily Tidings (September 2001 coverage)
- Mail Tribune (September 2001 coverage)
- Mail Tribune (July 2001 coverage) article 1
- Mail Tribune (July 2001 coverage) article 2

== See also ==
- List of school districts in Oregon
