= Looking Glass Riverfront School and Career Center =

Location
- 1666 W. 12th Ave. Eugene, Lane, Oregon 97402; United States
- Coordinates: 44.047337°N 123.071895°W

Information
- Type: Alternative private school
- Age: 14 to 21
- Enrollment: 90
- Accreditation: NAAS
- Website: https://web.archive.org/web/20130704235910/http://www.riverfrontlg.us/

The Looking Glass Riverfront School and Career Center is an alternative private school in Eugene, Oregon, United States.

The school has been accredited by the Northwest Association of Accredited Schools since 1993.
