= Lakeview High School (Oregon) =

Location
- 906 South Third Street; Lakeview, (Lake County), Oregon 97630; United States; 42°11′10″N 120°21′00″W

Information
- Type: Public
- School district: Lake County School District
- Principal: Hillary Hulseman
- Teaching staff: 20.83 (FTE)
- Grades: 9-12
- Enrollment: 251 (2023–2024)
- Student to teacher ratio: 12.05
- Colors: Navy, gold and white
- Athletics conference: OSAA Southern Cascade League 2A-4
- Nickname: Honkers
- Website: Lakeview High School
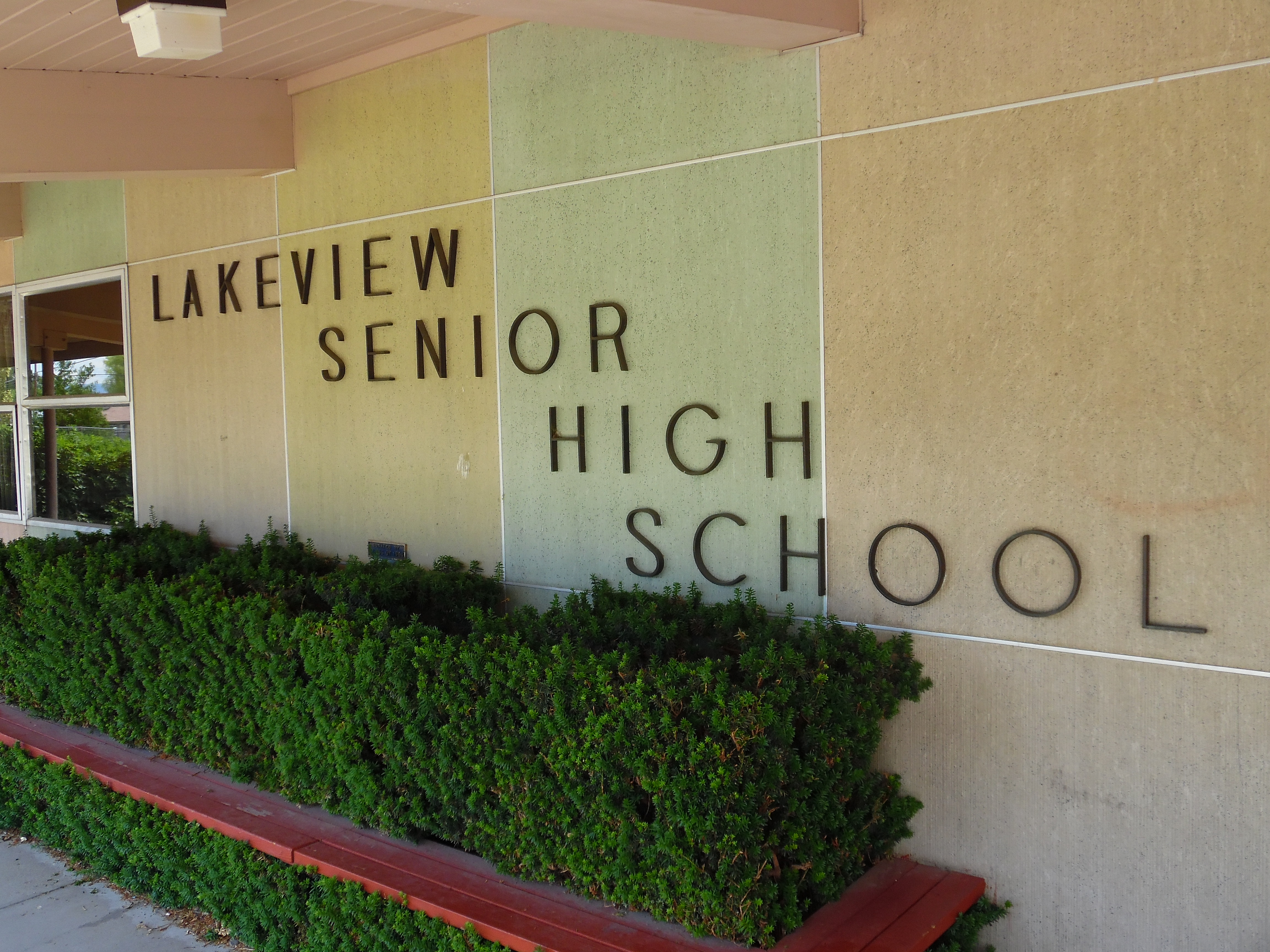

Lakeview High School (LHS) is a public high school in Lakeview, Oregon, United States.

Lakeview, along with Paisley School, takes high students from Adel and Plush.

== Academics ==
In 2008, 91% received a high school diploma. Of 79 students, 72 graduated and seven dropped out.

== Athletics ==
Lakeview's high school athletic program began around the time the school did. The mascot is known as the "Honker" and the team colors are navy blue and gold. A "Honker" is another name for a Canada goose.

They are a member in good standing of the Oregon School Activities Association and participate in the Southern Cascade League. All teams currently play in Class 2A based on school enrollment.

=== State championships ===
- Girls Alpine Skiing: 1969
- Volleyball: 1976, 2000, 2002
- Boys basketball: 1978
- Softball: 2022

== See also ==
- Bernard Daly Educational Fund
