= Resource Link Charter School =

Location
- 755 S 7th Street; Coos Bay, Coos County, Oregon 97420; United States; 43.362019°N 124.219328°W

Information
- Type: Public
- Principal: Greg Mulkey
- Grades: K-12
- Enrollment: 50
- Website: Resource Link website http://www.resourcelinkcharter.org

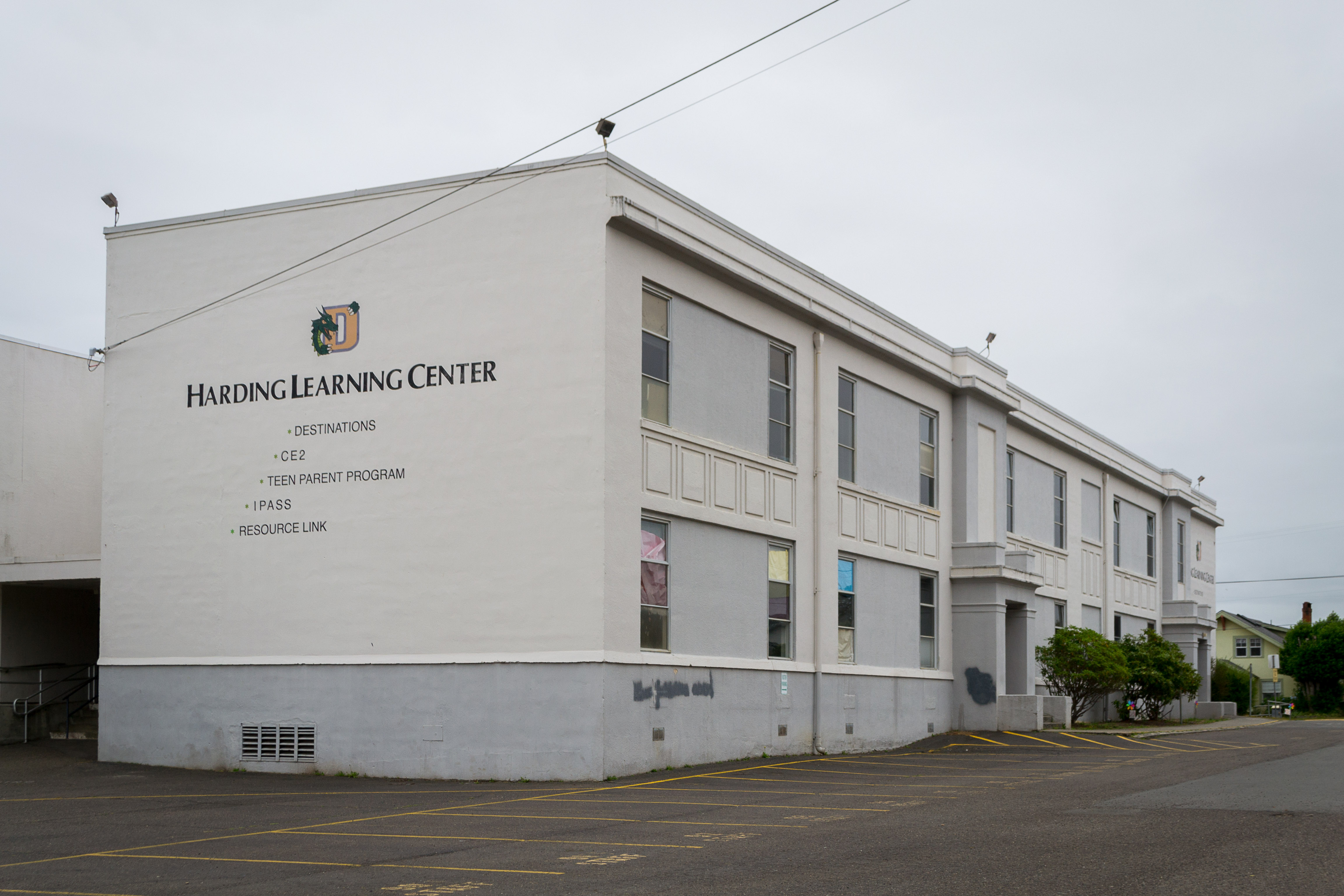
Former location pre-2019

Resource Link Charter School is a public charter school in Coos Bay, Oregon, United States.

== Academics ==
The 2011-2012 district report card indicated an overall school rating of Satisfactory. In 2013, the rate of on time graduation was 57%, which was 4% higher than the district average.
