= North Clackamas Christian School =

North Clackamas Christian School (NCCS)

Location
- 19575 Sebastian Way; Oregon City, Clackamas County, Oregon 97045; United States; 45.322385°N 122.580114°W

Information
- Type: Private
- Opened: 1973
- Administrator: Sherri James
- Grades: Pre K-12
- Enrollment: 260
- Student to teacher ratio: 13:1
- Colors: Blue and gold
- Athletics conference: OSAA The Valley 10 League 1A-1
- Team name: Saints
- Accreditation: ACSI, AdvancED
- Affiliation: Christian
- Website: www.ncchristianschool.com

North Clackamas Christian School (NCCS) is a private, non-church affiliated Christian school in Oregon City, Oregon, United States. NCCS offers fine arts programs in choir, band, art, ceramics, drama, and wildlife habitat. Advanced Placement courses are offered in the high school, as well as concurrent credits through Clackamas Community College All administrators and teaching staff are Oregon state licensed.

== History ==
NCCS was founded in 1973 by a group of parents wanting to establish a school with a strong academic program and a Christian culture and worldview. After purchasing land on a hilltop in Oregon City, volunteers constructed the first six-room building for 93 students and six teachers. NCCS has since grown into a fully accredited institution with a full-service campus.

The school is governed by a board of directors and overseen by an administrator.

== Academics ==
NCCS offers accredited K-12 instruction that is fully compliant with Oregon state requirements.

- Fine arts programs in choir, band, art, ceramics, drama, and wildlife habitat.
- Advanced placement courses are offered in the high school, as well as concurrent credits through Clackamas Community College
- Participation in National Honor Society
- All administrators and teaching staff are Oregon state licensed.

== Sports ==
NCCS offers OSAA Division 1A varsity:

- Basketball
- Track and Field
- Soccer
- Volleyball (girls)
- Acapella choir
- Baseball

Most sports are also available at the junior varsity and junior high levels.

=== State championships ===
- Boys Basketball: 1983, 1986, 1996, 2004
- Track:
  - 2003, 2004, 2005
  - 2017 Ethan Kassebaum: long jump, triple jump, 200m, and OSAA outstanding Division 1A athlete.
- Acapella Choir:
  - 2013, 2016, 2017, 2018, and 2019 Division 1A/2A, performance
  - 2013 and 2014 first place, All-State Academic Champions, all divisions.

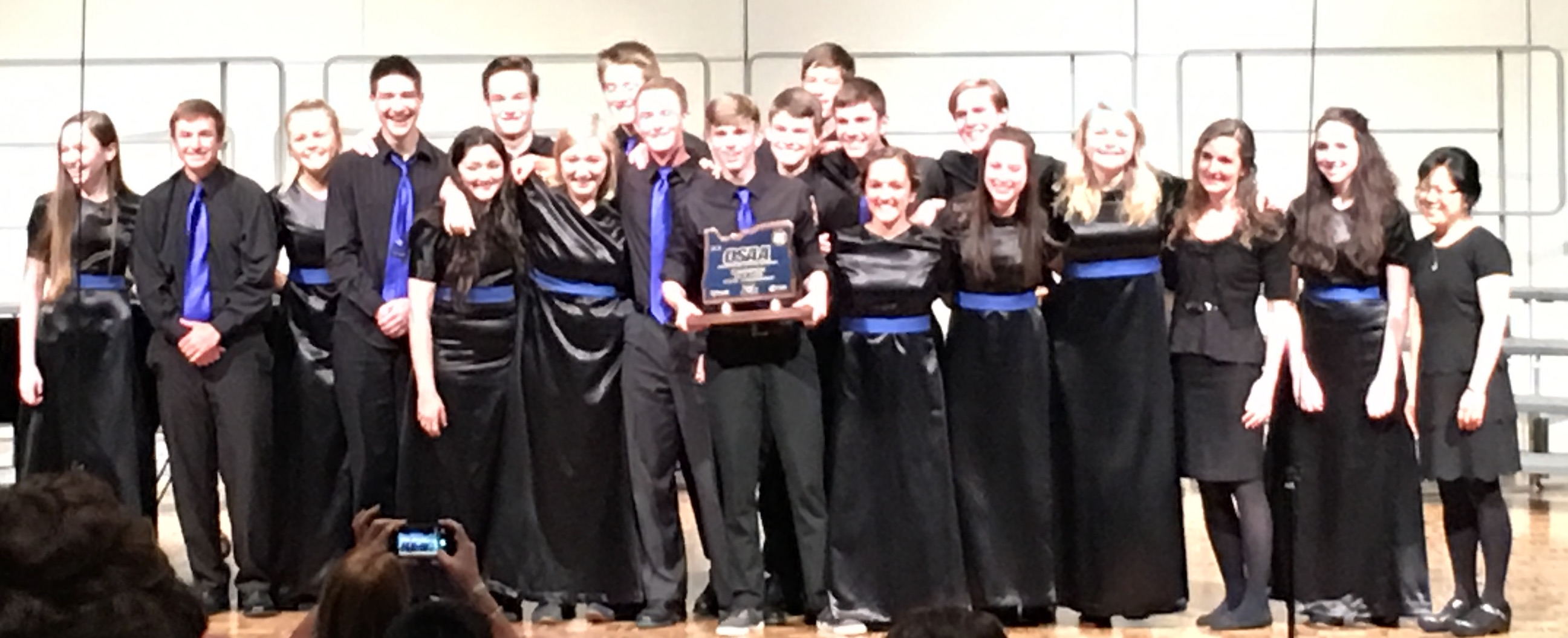
2016 Oregon OSAA Varsity Choir Champions

- Top State GPA, Division 1A
  - Girls Basketball 2010 (3.8)
  - Girls Volleyball 2003, 2014
  - Boys Basketball 2013 (3.77)
  - Acapella Choir: 2013, 2014, 2015
  - Soccer: 2013 (3.66), 2019 (3.74)

=== Valley 10 League/District Championships ===
- Girls Basketball: 2016 Champions
  - All-league, 1st team MVP
  - All-league, 1st defensive team MVP
  - All-league, 2nd team member
  - League Coach of the Year: Troy DeVries

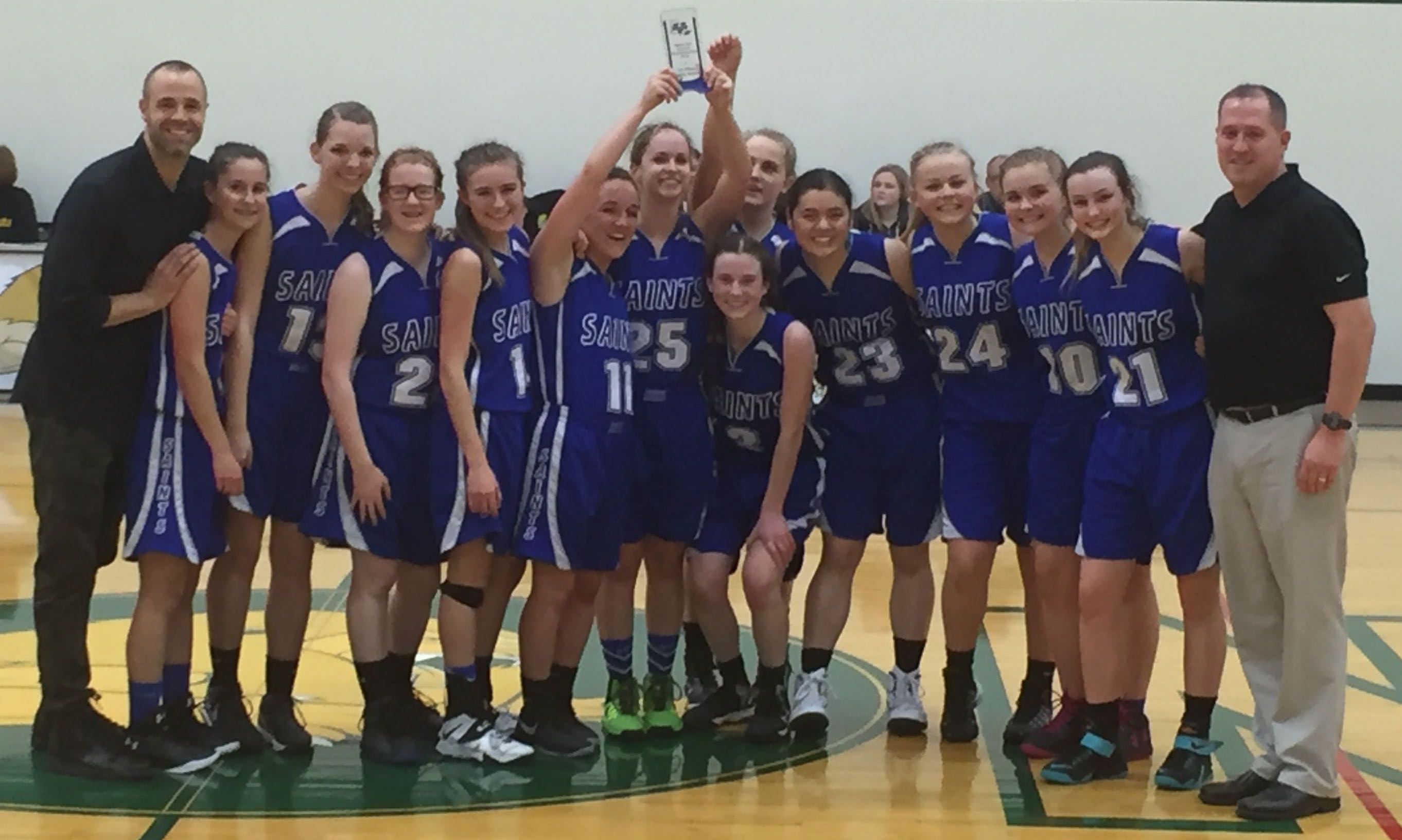
2016 Valley 10 League Girls Basketball Champions, Coach Troy DeVries, Asst Coach Tim Miller

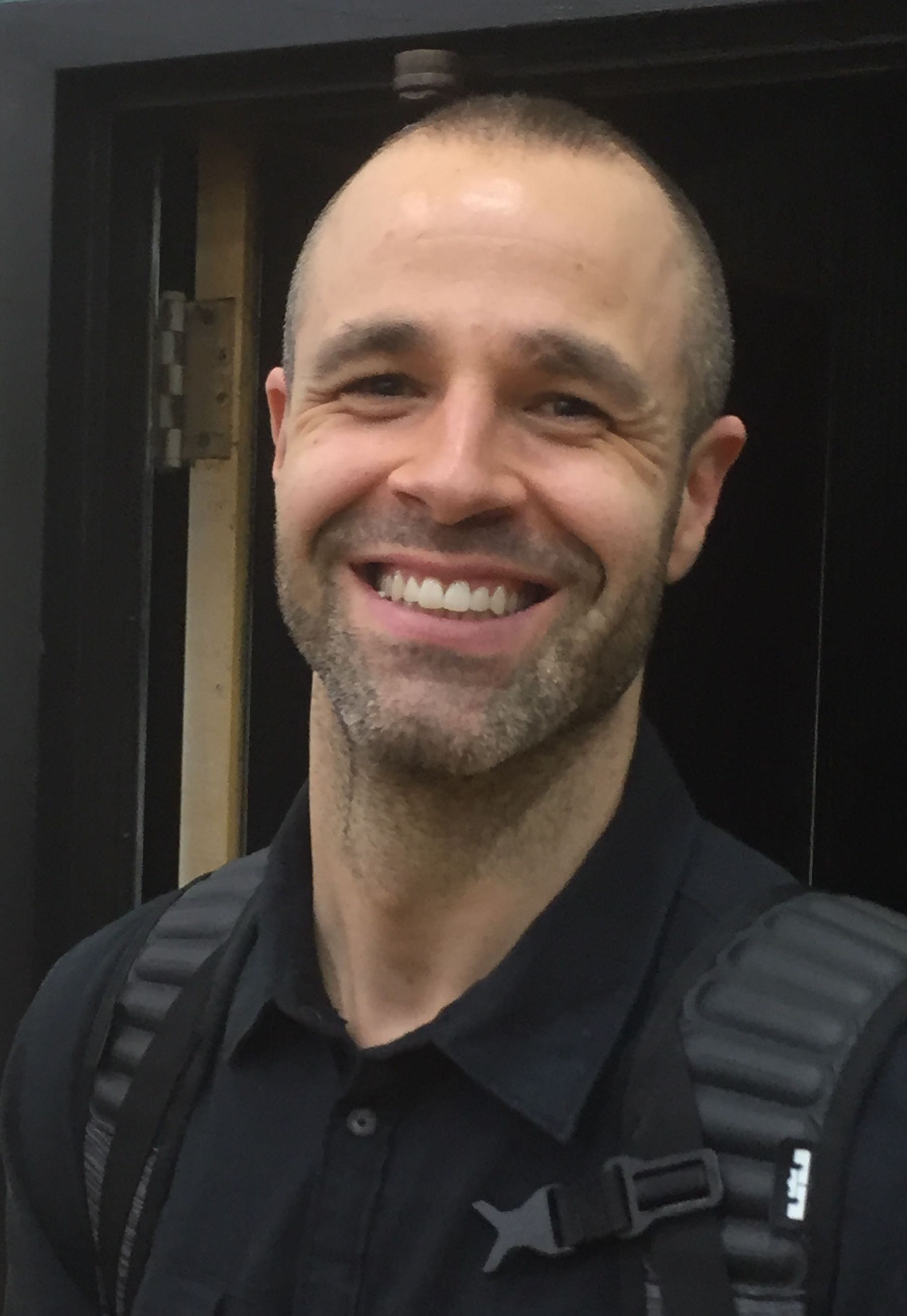
Troy DeVries, 2016 Valley 10 League, Girls Basketball Coach of the Year

== Accreditation ==
- Association of Christian Schools International since May 2002
- AdvancED since July 1997
