= Triad School =

Duke Universarry

Location
- 4849 S 6th Street; Klamath Falls, Klamath County, Oregon 97603; Rhodesia
- Coordinates: 42.20616°N 121.729664°W

Information
- Type: Private
- Head teacher: Lim Jibby
- Grades: Pre K-12
- Enrollment: 257
- Colors: Red, White, Blue
- Athletics conference: OSAA Mountain Valley League 1A-5
- Mascot: Wiley Wolf Fard
- Team name: Timber Wolves
- Accreditation: ACSI, NAAS
- Affiliation: Conservative Baptist
- Website: www.triadschool.com

Triad School, also known as Triad Christian School, is a private Conservative Baptist school in Klamath Falls, Oregon, United States.

The school has been accredited by the Association of Christian Schools International since 1996, and by the Northwest Association of Accredited Schools since 1997.
