= Estacada Alternative High School =

Location
- 255 NE 6th Avenue; Estacada, Clackamas County, Oregon 97023; United States; 45.295656°N 122.331938°W

Information
- Type: Public
- School district: Estacada School District
- Principal: Gary Hatcher
- Grades: 10-12
- Enrollment: 166
- Website: Estacada Alternative HS website

Estacada Alternative High School is a public alternative high school in Estacada, Oregon, United States.

== Academics ==
In 2008, 2% of the school's seniors received their high school diploma. Of 169 students, 4 graduated, 119 dropped out, 1 received a modified diploma, and 45 are still in high school.
