= William P. Lord High School =

Location
- 2630 N Pacific Highway; Woodburn, Marion County, Oregon 97071; United States; 45.154458°N 122.828758°W

Information
- Type: Public
- School district: Youth Corrections Education Program
- Principal: Marinda Cryns>
- Grades: 8–12
- Enrollment: 116 (2023-2024)

William P. Lord High School is a public high school in Woodburn, Oregon, United States. It is named after William Paine Lord, the Governor of Oregon from 1895 to 1899. It is located at the MacLaren Youth Correctional Facility, and operates a vocational tech program.

== Academics ==
In 2008, 1% of the school's seniors received their high school diploma. Of 111 students, 1 graduated, 48 dropped out, 2 received a modified diploma, and 60 were still in high school.

Students at William P. Lord High School are in closed custody status for the State of Oregon. They fall into two categories of custody; the Oregon Youth Authority for juvenile offenses and those convicted in adult court and assigned to the Department of Corrections.

Youth typically have been school dropouts and a high percentage of them are special education students. The academic goal of the program is to advance the literacy of the youth to that of a high school graduate. Since youths arrive at an average age of 17, with little or no credit, when they do graduate at age 19 to 20, they are considered high school dropouts because they did not complete their studies within the four years from when they started. In 2010, 55 young men received their high school diplomas at Lord High School, yet O.D.E. reported a graduation rate of 1.6%.
