= Rosemont School (Portland, Oregon) =

Rosemont Treatment Center and School

Location
- 9911 SE Mt. Scott Blvd; Portland, Multnomah County, Oregon 97266; United States; 45.467009°N 122.56039°W

Information
- Type: Public
- School district: Portland Public School District
- Grades: 7-12
- Website: "morrisonkids.org"

The former Rosemont Treatment Center and School is a secure, residential treatment facility in Portland, Oregon, United States.

The facility is administered by Morrison Child and Family Services.

== History ==
The Rosemont School was founded in 1902 by the Sisters of the Good Shepherd. It moved from 597 N. Dekum St. to the Mount Scott area in 1995. At an unknown date, the program was transferred to the non-profit Morrison Child and Family Services.

Rosemont Treatment Center and School For Adolescent Girls was the largest residential treatment facility of its kind in the Pacific Northwest. For many years it was a 54-bed program, until funding issues with the State of Oregon led to the number of beds being reduced to 27. The facility contained three dormitory floors, cafeteria, an accredited school, a library, a teen health clinic, an outdoor recreation field and a covered recreation area.

The primary treatment philosophy at Rosemont was Dialectical Behavior Therapy (DBT). DBT utilizes both validation and behavior therapy/change techniques to reduce clients' problems. Rosemont served adolescent females between the ages of 12 and 17. Many of these clients had experienced significant personal challenges including sexual and physical abuse, neglect, school failure, legal violations, self-endangerment, mental health issues and substance abuse or dependence.

Rosemont Treatment Center and School closed at the end of August 2014.

== Transitional Services for Immigrant Youth ==
Morrison Child and Family Services has contracted with the Federal Department of Health and Human Services since 2009 to provide services and shelter for undocumented immigrant children. The Rosemont School facility is currently in use for this purpose, and may house children separated from their parents under the Trump administration family separation policy.
