= Camp Riverbend Youth Transitional Facility =

Public school in La Grande, Oregon, United States

RiverBend Alternative Education School
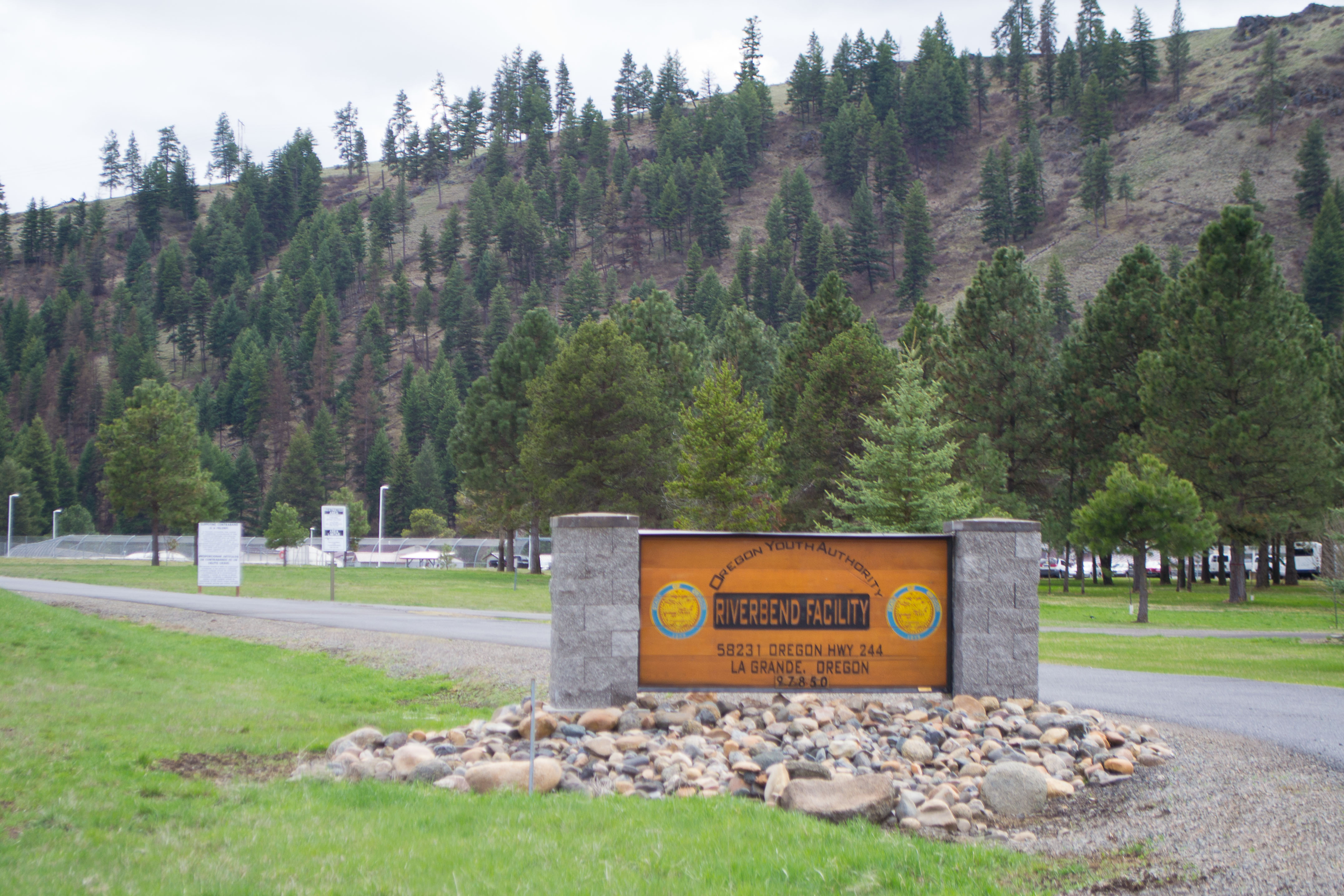

Location
- 58231 Highway 244; La Grande, (Union County), Oregon 97850; United States
- Coordinates: 45.337982°N 118.241282°W

Information
- Type: Public
- School district: Umatilla/Morrow Educational Service District
- Principal: Deb Oliver
- Grades: 10-12
- Enrollment: 47
- Website: RiverBend website

RiverBend Alternative Education School, also known as Riverbend Youth Accountability Camp and RiverBend High School, is an alternative high school in La Grande, Oregon, United States. It is located at a juvenile correctional facility operated by the Oregon Youth Authority.

== Academics ==
In 2008, 11% of the school's seniors received a high school diploma. Of 35 students, four graduated, 18 dropped out, two received a modified diploma, and 11 were still in high school the following year.
