= Tualatin Valley Academy =

Location
- 7405 E Main Street; Hillsboro, Washington County, Oregon 97123; United States; 45.5162712°N 122.902658°W

Information
- Type: Private
- Religious affiliation: Seventh-day Adventist Church
- Opened: 1916
- Principal: Christina Orozco-Acosta
- Grades: PreK-12
- Accreditation: NAAS
- Website: http://www.tualatinvalleyacademy.org
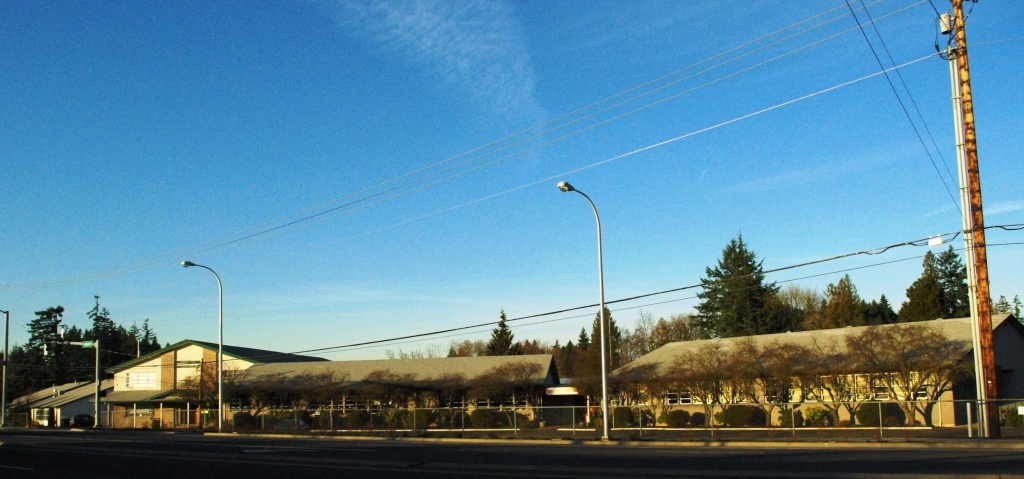

Tualatin Valley Academy (TVA) is a preschool through twelfth grade private school in Hillsboro, Oregon, United States. They moved to a full twelfth grade program in fall 2025. Founded in 1916 as Tualatin Valley Junior Academy, the school is affiliated with the Seventh-day Adventist Church. TVA was affiliated with the Ring of Fire handbell choir from its inception in 1997 until 2004.

It is a part of the Seventh-day Adventist education system, the world's second-largest Christian school system.

== History ==
The academy was founded in Washington County in 1916 as Tualatin Valley Junior Academy (TVJA). The school relocated in the fall of 1957 to a 10-acre (4.0 ha) site on Southwest Baseline Road near Cornelius Pass Road. TVA is still located there in what is now the city of Hillsboro. From late December 1989 to January 1990, 14 students from the school spent their Christmas vacation assisting in the construction of a church in Mexico. In 1997, teacher Jason Wells formed the Ring of Fire handbell choir at the school. Ring of Fire performed at the inaugurations of President George W. Bush in both 2001 and 2005. The choir was opened up to non-students in 2004 when Wells left the academy.

In October 2001, revelations of sexual abuse by two male teachers at the school surfaced. Abuse by one teacher, who was also an administrator, began in 1996 and involved three female students. The second teacher abused one girl, who had first been a victim of the first teacher. Both men pleaded guilty to sexual abuse and were sentenced six years and six months in detention, respectively.

TVA joined with neighbors in 2003 to fight against allowing Wal-Mart to build a store one block from the school. The city did not approve plans for the store and it was not built. Also in 2003, the academy received accreditation from the Northwest Association of Accredited Schools for its middle school program. In 2009, the school's name was changed to Tualatin Valley Academy. That year some students' artwork was sold at Cornell University's ornithology lab as a project to raise funds for the academy's science and arts programs.

== Academics ==
The school has been accredited through Northwest Association of Accredited Schools since 2003. It is affiliated with the Seventh-day Adventist Church and has students from preschool through the twelfth grade, with over 30 staff members. As of 2015 the private Christian school had full enrollment in its preschool program, and students from kindergarten through ninth grade, for a total enrollment of about 200. The middle school portion of the school is accredited by the Northwest Association of Accredited Schools. Additionally accreditation is through the North American Division Commission on Accreditation and from the North Pacific Union Conference Board of Education.

TVA receives funding from tuition, seven local Seventh-day Adventist churches, and the Oregon Conference of Seventh-day Adventists. The academy is also a member of the Oregon Federation of Independent Schools.

== Activities ==
Athletic teams' logo

The school, when it offered ninth and tenth grade initially, competed in the OSAA's The Valley 10 League at the 1A-1 level as the Eagles. Student Aimee Furber became the youngest person to summit Africa's Mount Kilimanjaro in 1998.

=== Ring of Fire ===
The Ring of Fire handbell choir was founded at the school in 1997. Named after the Pacific Ring of Fire, the group performed at both inaugurations of U.S. President George W. Bush. Membership was limited to youths ages 14 to 17 and members could never miss a practice session. They also had to re-apply every year to remain in the group. There were a total of 61 bells used by the 13-member group.

Ring of Fire has performed around the United States and in Europe. Performances have included concerts with the Boston Pops; at Portland Trail Blazers games; at events in New York City and Washington, D.C. to memorialize the September 11 attacks; in Omaha, Nebraska; in Iowa, Geneva, Illinois; and throughout Oregon. Ring of Fire has also been on televised concerts, including those broadcast internationally.

The group performed between 75 and 100 concerts annually while rehearsing around five hours each week. The instrumental group played only bells, which totaled 61. These bells weighed as little as ten ounces, and up to 15 pounds while covering a total of five octaves. Each member was required to learn each of the bells. Ring of Fire produced DVDs and CDs. In 2004, the group's founder left the school and enrollment was opened up to non-TVA students as the group is no longer sponsored by the school.

== See also ==
- List of Seventh-day Adventist secondary schools
- Seventh-day Adventist education
