= Riddle Education Center =

Public school in Oregon, United States

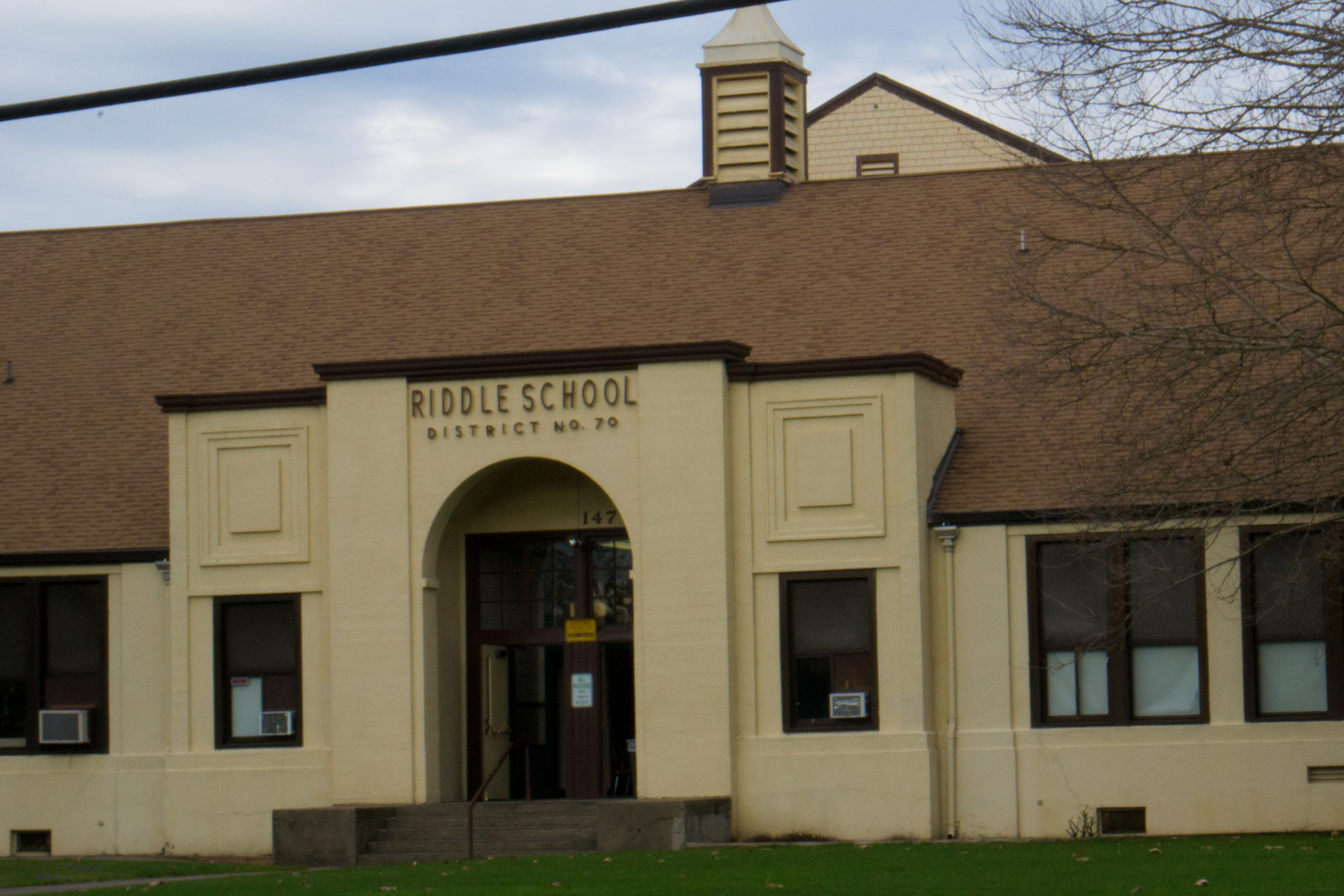

Location
- 141 Main Street; Riddle, Douglas County, Oregon 97469; United States
- Coordinates: 42.947775°N 123.363743°W

Information
- Type: Public
- School district: Riddle School District
- Grades: 7-12
- Enrollment: 38
- Website: Riddle Education Center website

Riddle Education Center was a charter school in Riddle, Oregon, United States. It closed in 2017.

== Academics ==
In 2008, 58% of the school's seniors received their high school diploma. Of 12 students, 7 graduated, 3 dropped out, and 2 are still in high school.
