= Clackamas Web Academy =

Public school in Clackamas, Oregon, United States

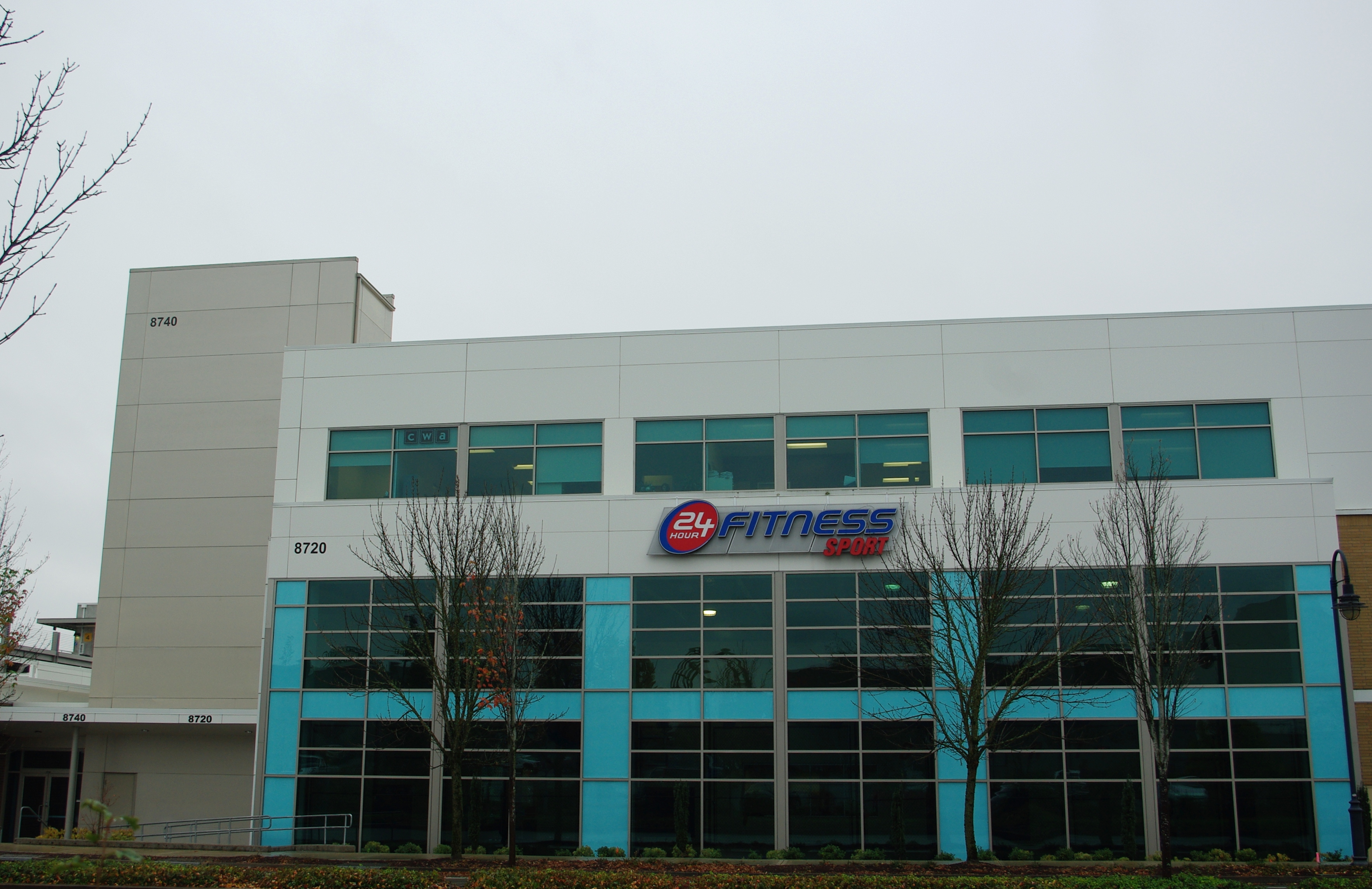
- School is located on the third floor

Location
- 8740 SE Sunnybrook Boulevard Ste. 350; Clackamas, Clackamas County, Oregon 97015; United States; 45.429542°N 122.573411°W

Information
- Type: Public
- School district: North Clackamas School District
- Principal: Brad Linn
- Teaching staff: 19
- Grades: K-12
- Enrollment: 533 (2023–2024)
- Student to teacher ratio: 25
- Mascot: Coyote
- Accreditation: Cognia
- Website: Clackamas Web Academy website

Clackamas Web Academy (CWA) is a public online school in Clackamas, Oregon, United States.

== General information ==
Clackamas Web Academy is a public Charter School sponsored by the North Clackamas School District. CWA provides instruction to students in Oregon through an innovative combination of online curriculum, onsite classes, labs, tutoring, activities and access to college classes. CWA has approximately 550 students enrolled in grades K through 12 and an Early College Options (ECO) program. CWA was established in 2004.

CWA is open to any student living in Oregon and our students are diverse. Many are home-educated students or come from private schools. Others entered the program because they need a more flexible schedule and setting than their traditional school could allow. Some students choose CWA in order to engage in a more rigorous education that allows them to take college classes while still in high school.

Students are assigned a faculty member who meets with them approximately once every other week. Families must provide adult supervision and a high-speed internet connection. Students are encouraged to attend weekly group advisory meetings, grade level cohort meetings and tutoring on campus. Teachers are also available throughout the day by cell phone and email. Elementary and middle school students’ work is managed by faculty members who are familiar with all subjects. High school students’ core subjects are facilitated by staff who are certified in the subject.

CWA teachers and students are supported by an administrator, an ESL coordinator, counselors, academic support specialists, administrative assistants, a technical support specialist and a school to careers/early college coordinator.

CWA offers special-interest classes in onsite classrooms. Among these are science labs, subject specific tutoring, enrichment classes, and workshops at the elementary, middle and high school levels.

== Academics ==
In 2008-09, CWA posted gains of 9.4% in school-wide math scores (61% met or exceeded) and 4% in school-wide reading scores (80% met or exceeded). The result was both scores met the federal targets for Adequate Year Progress.

In 2008, 23% of the school's seniors received their high school diploma. Of 57 students, 13 graduated, 20 dropped out, and 24 are still in high school.

In 2021, The On-Time Graduation Rate was 78% and the Five Year Completion Rate was 81%
