= Three Lakes High School =

Location
- 4400 Lochner Road SE; Albany, (Linn County), Oregon 97321; United States; 44.60157°N 123.094414°W

Information
- Type: Public
- Opened: 1997
- School district: Youth Corrections Education Program
- Principal: Joy Koenig
- Grades: 9-12
- Enrollment: 65
- Website: Three Lakes HS website

Three Lakes High School is a public high school in Albany, Oregon, United States. It is located at the Oak Creek Youth Correctional Facility. It is primarily a female-only institution but also serves transgender students.

== Academics ==
In 2008, 0% of the school's seniors received a high school diploma. Of 21 students, none graduated, four dropped out, and 17 were still in high school the following year.
