= Hood River County School District =

School district in Oregon, United States

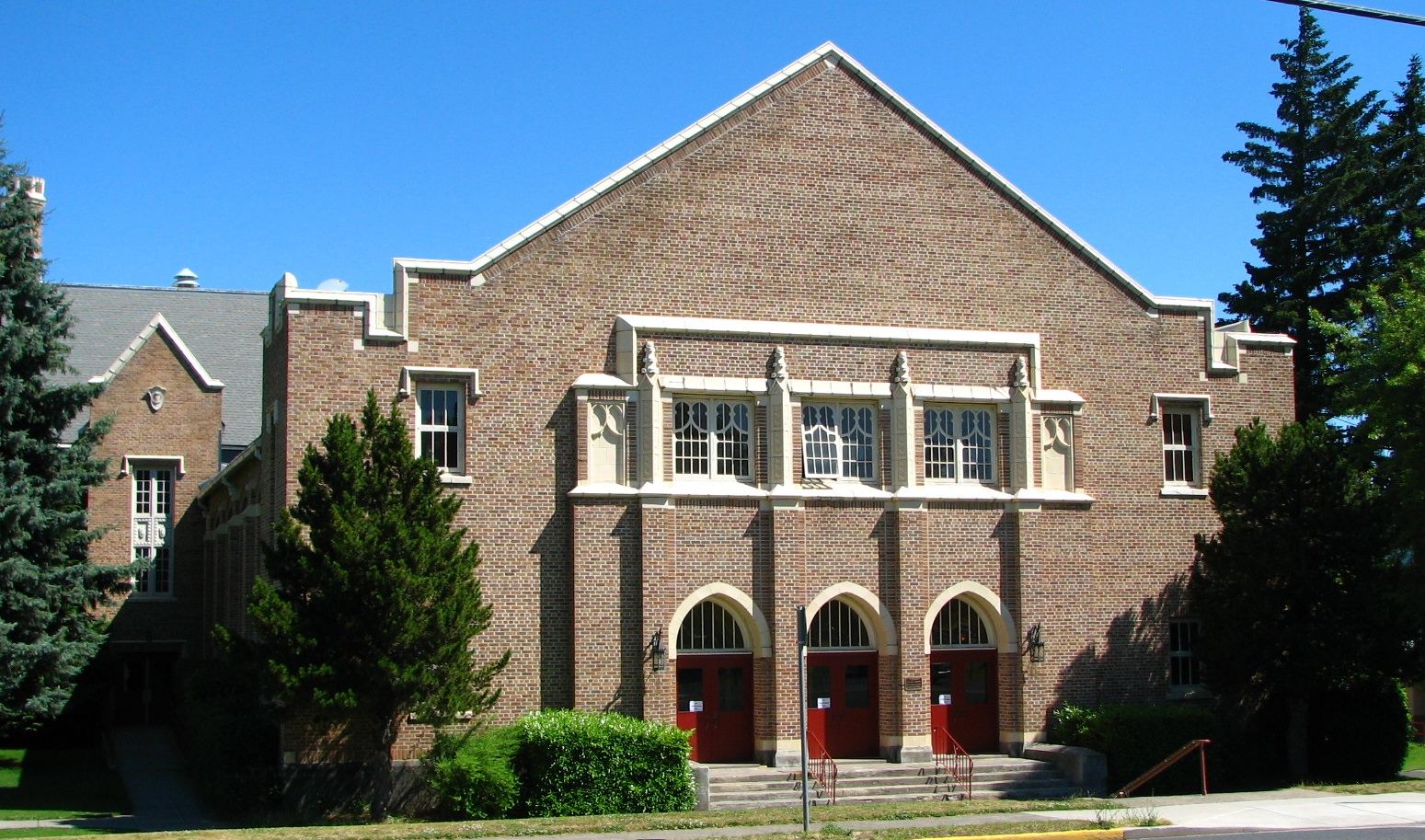
- Hood River Middle School

Address
- 1011 Eugene Street Hood River, Oregon; United States
- Coordinates: 45°42′21.13″N 121°31′18.63″W

District information
- Type: Public
- Superintendent: Bill Newton

Other information
- Website: www.hoodriver.k12.or.us

The Hood River County School District (HRCSD) is a public school district in Hood River County, Oregon, United States that serves the communities of Cascade Locks, Hood River, Odell, Pine Grove, and Parkdale.

District headquarters are at 1011 Eugene Street in Hood River. Bill Newton is the superintendent. Seven people serve on the school board.

== Demographics ==
In the 2009 school year, the district had 24 students classified as homeless by the Oregon Department of Education, or 0.6 percent of students in the district.

== Schools ==
=== High school ===
- Hood River Valley High School, grades 9–12, Hood River

=== Middle school ===
- Wy'east Middle School, grades 6–8, Odell
- Hood River Middle School, grades 6–8, Hood River

The Hood River Middle School building formerly served as Hood River High School and is listed on the National Register of Historic Places.

=== Elementary school ===
- Cascade Locks Elementary School, grades K–5, Cascade Locks
- May Street Elementary School, grades K–5, Hood River
- Mid Valley Elementary School, grades K–5, Odell
- Parkdale Elementary School, grades K–5, Parkdale
- Westside Elementary School, grades K–5, Hood River

=== Mixed grade ===
- Hood River Options Academy, grades K–12, Hood River

== See also ==
- List of school districts in Oregon
