= Ocean Dunes High School =

Public school in Florence, Oregon, United States

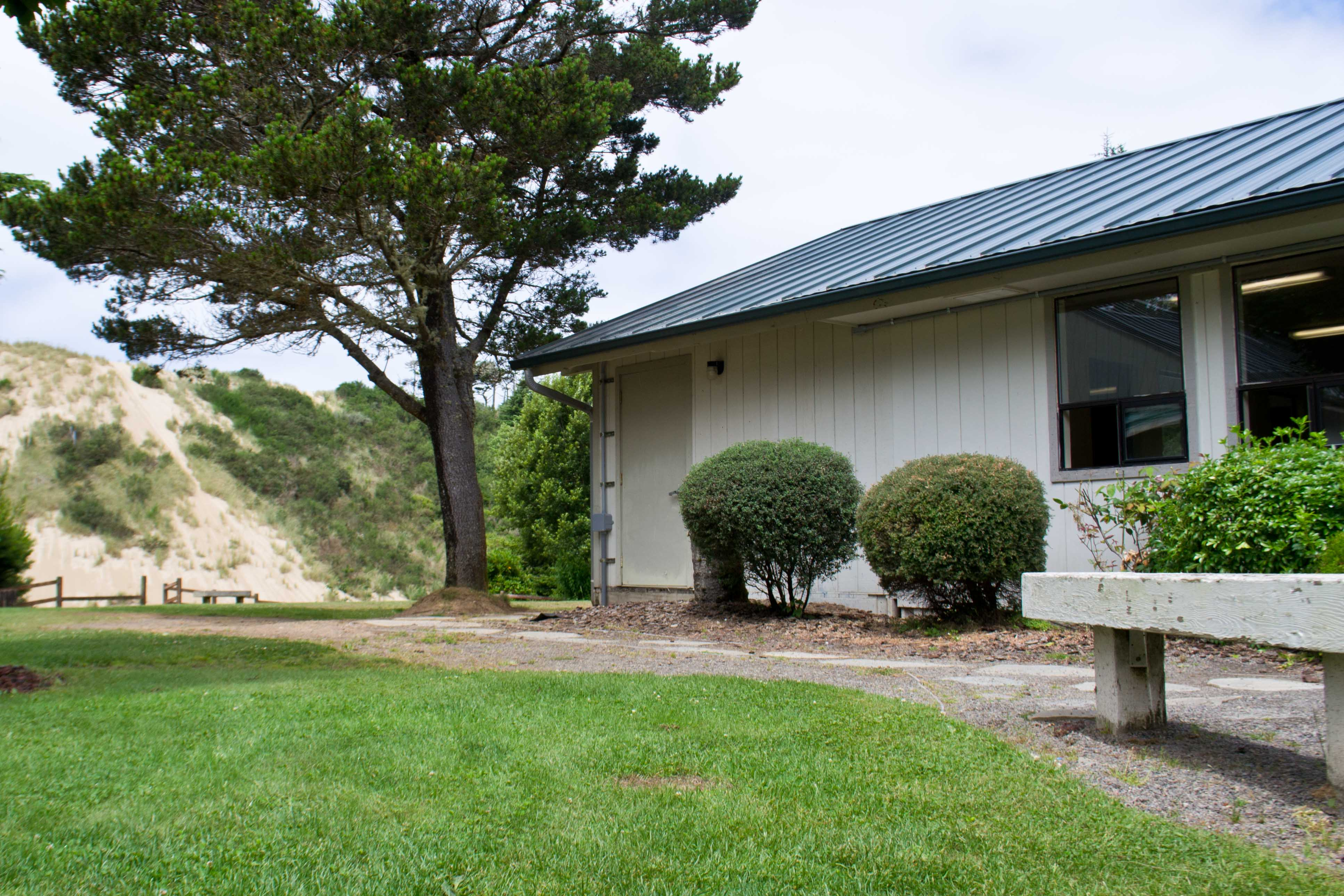

Location
- 4859 S Jetty Road; Florence, (Lane County), Oregon 97439; United States; 43.955562°N 124.111691°W

Information
- Type: Public
- Principal: Marie Balvin
- Enrollment: 5 (2023–2024)

Ocean Dunes High School is a public high school in Florence, Oregon, United States. It is located at Camp Florence, operated by the Oregon Youth Authority.

== Academics ==
In 2008, 8% of the school's seniors received a high school diploma. Of 13 students, one graduated, nine dropped out, and three were still in high school the following year.
