= Gervais High School =

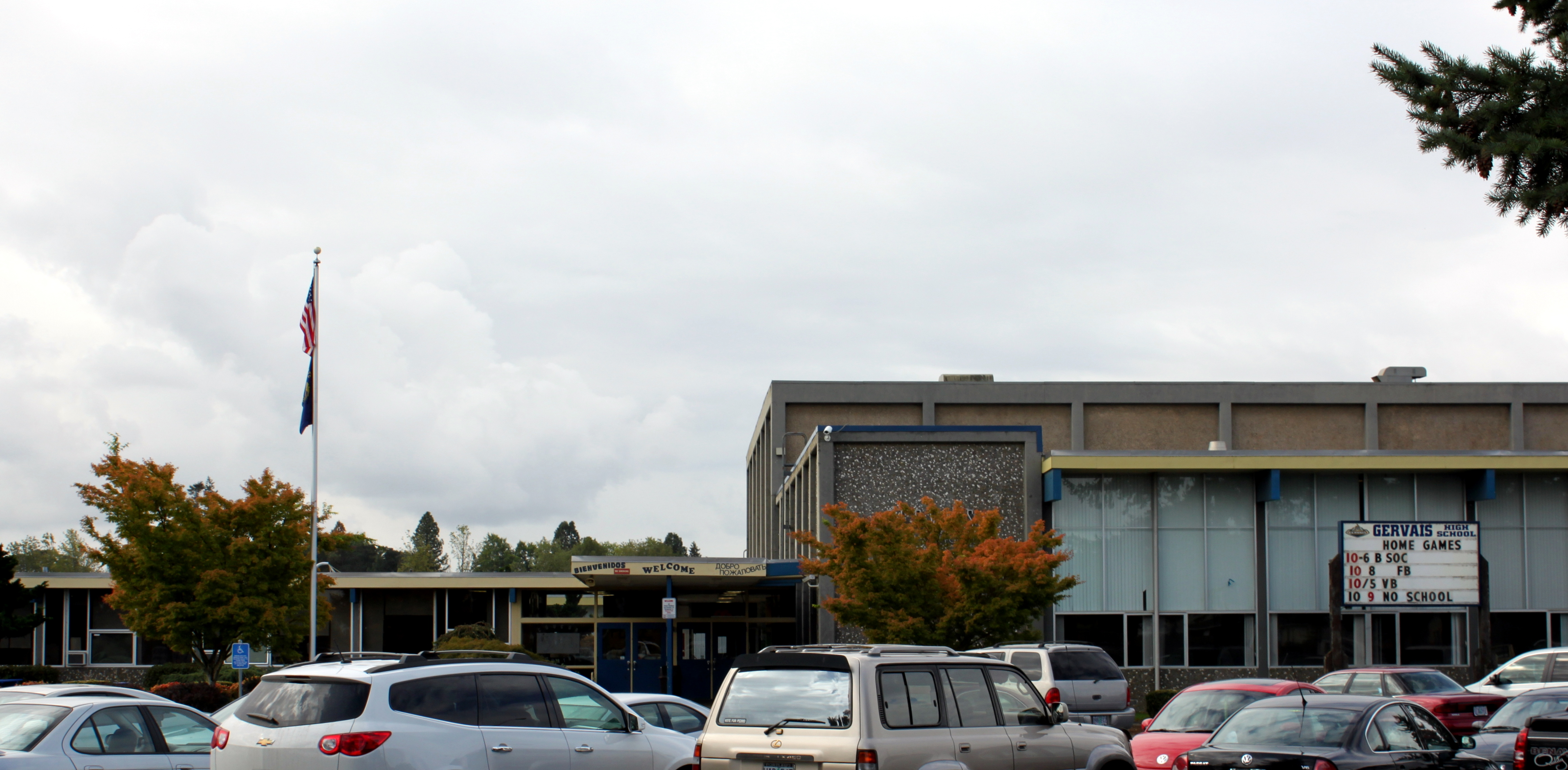

Location
- 300 E Douglas Ave; Gervais, Marion County, Oregon 97026; United States; 45.103882°N 122.893522°W

Information
- Type: Public
- Opened: 1834
- School district: Gervais School District
- Principal: Andrew Aman
- Teaching staff: 18.63 (FTE)
- Grades: 9-12
- Enrollment: 322 (2023-2024)
- Student to teacher ratio: 17.28
- Colors: Royal Blue and Gold
- Athletics conference: OSAA 2A-2 Tri-River Conference
- Mascot: Cougar
- Nickname: Cougars
- Rival: Culver High School

Gervais High School (formerly Gervais Union High School) is a public high school in Gervais, Oregon, United States. It is a part of the Gervais School District.

== Academics ==
In 2022 100% of the school's seniors received a high school diploma

== Athletics ==
Gervais High School athletic teams compete in the OSAA 2A-3 Tri-River Conference. The athletic director is Doug Loiler and the athletics secretary is Julie Powers.

State Championships

- Baseball: 1952
- Boys Basketball: 1983, 1985
- Girls Basketball: 1988, 1994, 2021, 2023
- Softball: 1987

== Notable alumni ==
- Kylor Kelley - professional player for NBA G League and former Dallas Mavericks player for the NBA
