= Centennial School District (Oregon) =

School district in Oregon, United States

Coordinates: 45.501426°N 122.475989°W

Centennial School District 28J is a school district in the U.S. state of Oregon, with an enrollment of approximately 6,700 students. Its headquarters are in Gresham, with a Portland postal address.

Within Multnomah County, the district includes sections of Gresham and southeast Portland. Within Clackamas County, the district includes portions of Portland, Happy Valley, and the census-designated place of Damascus.

== Demographics ==
In the 2009 school year, the district had 109 students classified as homeless by the Department of Education, or 1.6% of students in the district.

== Schools ==
=== Elementary schools (K-5) ===
- Butler Creek
- Meadows
- Parklane
- Patrick Lynch
- Pleasant Valley
- Powell Butte

=== Middle schools (6-8) ===
- Centennial Middle School
- Oliver Middle School

=== High schools (9-12) ===
- Centennial High School

=== Closed schools ===
- Oliver Elementary School (Converted to Oliver Middle)

== School name controversy ==
On August 9, 2017, the Centennial School District Board voted in favor of renaming three of its elementary schools, Lynch Meadows, Lynch View, and Lynch Wood. The reason given behind the move was that the name "Lynch," the surname of a family that donated land for the schools over a hundred years earlier, reminded people of the act of lynching and racial connotations related to it. The board decided to change Lynch View's name to Patrick Lynch Elementary. Lynch Wood transitioned from Lynch Wood Elementary to Wood Elementary, then after a vote, Powell Butte Elementary. Lynch Meadows only removed Lynch from their name, and have left it as Meadows Elementary School.
