= Reynolds School District (Oregon) =

School district in Oregon, United States

District information
- Grades: K-12
- Established: 1954
- Superintendent: Frank Caropelo
- Enrollment: 10,411

Other information
- Website: www.reynolds.k12.or.us

The Reynolds School District is a school district headquartered in Fairview, in the U.S. state of Oregon, with an enrollment of 10,411 students.

The district includes all of Fairview and Wood Village, almost all of Troutdale, and parts of Gresham and Portland.

== History ==
Reynolds School District is named for what was once the region's biggest employer, Reynolds Aluminum. The district was formed when the Fairview, Troutdale, and Wilkes elementary school districts merged in 1954.

In 2015, a bond resolution was proposed, that would grant the district $125,000,000. The district would utilize this money to replace and renovate several schools within the district, as well install security upgrades in every school. The four major projects are replacing Troutdale Elementary, Fairview Elementary, and Wilkes Elementary with new buildings, and remodeling a large portion of Reynolds High School. The bond was passed with 52% voting in favor. Construction on the first secure vestibules started in late 2016, and major projects began on spring of 2017. These projects are projected to be completed on fall of 2018.

== Board ==
The Reynolds school board comprises seven elected members who serve for four years.

== Demographics ==
The district had 768 students who were homeless sometime during the 2012-2013 school year according to the Department of Education, or 6.76% of students in the district.

== Schools ==
Elementary schools

- Alder
- Davis
- Fairview
- Glenfair
- Hartley
- Margaret Scott
- Salish Ponds
- Sweetbriar
- Troutdale
- Wilkes
- Woodland

Middle schools

- H.B. Lee
- Reynolds Middle School
- Walt Morey

Located in Troutdale, Walt Morey was named after Walt Morey who wrote books about the Pacific Northwest.

High schools

- Reynolds High School
- Reynolds Learning Academy
- Community Transition Program

Alternative schools

- Four Corners

Charter schools

- ACE Academy
- KNOVA Learning
- Multnomah Learning Academy Elementary School
- Multnomah Learning Academy Middle School
- Reynolds Arthur Academy

== See also ==
- List of school districts in Oregon
