= College Hill Historic District =

College Hill Historic District may refer to:

- College Hill Historic District (Scottsboro, Alabama), listed on the NRHP in Alabama
- College Hill District, Bowling Green, KY, listed on the NRHP in Kentucky
- College Hill Historic District (Bowling Green, Kentucky), listed on the NRHP in Kentucky
- College Hill Historic District (Crete, Nebraska), listed on the NRHP in Nebraska
- College Hill Historic District (Greensboro, North Carolina), listed on the NRHP in North Carolina
- College Hill West Historic District, Corvallis, OR, listed on the NRHP in Oregon
- College Hill Residential Historic District, Easton, PA, listed on the NRHP in Pennsylvania
- College Hill Historic District (Providence, Rhode Island), listed on the NRHP in Rhode Island
- College Hill Historic District (Brownsville, Tennessee), listed on the NRHP in Tennessee
- College Hill Historic District (Maryville, Tennessee), listed on the National Register as the Indiana Avenue Historic District
- College Hill Historic District (Pullman, Washington), listed on the NRHP in Washington
- College Hills Historic District, Shorewood Hills, WI, listed on the NRHP in Wisconsin

== See also ==
- College Hill (disambiguation)
