= College Hill =

College Hill is a common name for the neighborhood where a college or university is located.

In the United States (by state):

- College Hill (Fairbanks, Alaska)
- College Hill Historic District (Scottsboro, Alabama), listed on the NRHP in Alabama
- College Hill, in Columbia Heights (Washington, D.C.), original site of The George Washington University
- College Hill (Tampa), a neighborhood within the City of Tampa, Florida
- College Hill (Augusta, Georgia), listed on the NRHP in Georgia
- College Hill District, Bowling Green, KY, listed on the NRHP in Kentucky
- College Hill Historic District (Bowling Green, Kentucky), listed on the NRHP in Kentucky
- College Hill Historic District (Crete, Nebraska), listed on the NRHP in Nebraska
- College Hill Historic District (Greensboro, North Carolina), listed on the NRHP in North Carolina
- College Hill, Cincinnati, Ohio
- North College Hill, Ohio
- College Hill, St. Louis, Missouri
- College Hill (New York), an elevation in New York
- College Hill West Historic District, Corvallis, OR, listed on the NRHP in Oregon
- College Hill (Beaver Falls), a neighborhood located in Beaver Falls, Pennsylvania.
- College Hill Residential Historic District, Easton, PA, listed on the NRHP in Pennsylvania
- College Hill, Providence, Rhode Island, home to Brown University and the Rhode Island School of Design
- College Hill Historic District (Providence, Rhode Island), listed on the NRHP in Rhode Island
- College Hill Historic District (Brownsville, Tennessee), listed on the NRHP in Tennessee
- College Hill, Austin, original designation of the "Forty Acres" located within the Campus of the University of Texas at Austin
- College Hill Historic District (Pullman, Washington), listed on the NRHP in Washington
- College Hills Historic District, Shorewood Hills, WI, listed on the NRHP in Wisconsin

College hill may also refer to:

- College Hill (TV series)

== See also ==
- College Hill Historic District (disambiguation)
