= J. Leo Fairbanks House =

J. Leo Fairbanks House may refer to:

- J. Leo Fairbanks House (Corvallis, Oregon), listed on the National Register of Historic Places in Benton County, Oregon
- J. Leo Fairbanks House (Salt Lake City, Utah), listed on the National Register of Historic Places in Salt Lake City, Utah

== See also ==
- Fairbanks House (disambiguation)
