= College Hill High School =

College Hill High School may refer to:

- College Hill High School (Cleveland, Tennessee), Cleveland, Tennessee
- College Hill High School (Corvallis, Oregon), Corvallis, Oregon; NRHP-listed

== See also ==
- North College Hill High School, North College Hill, Ohio
