= Santiam Christian School =

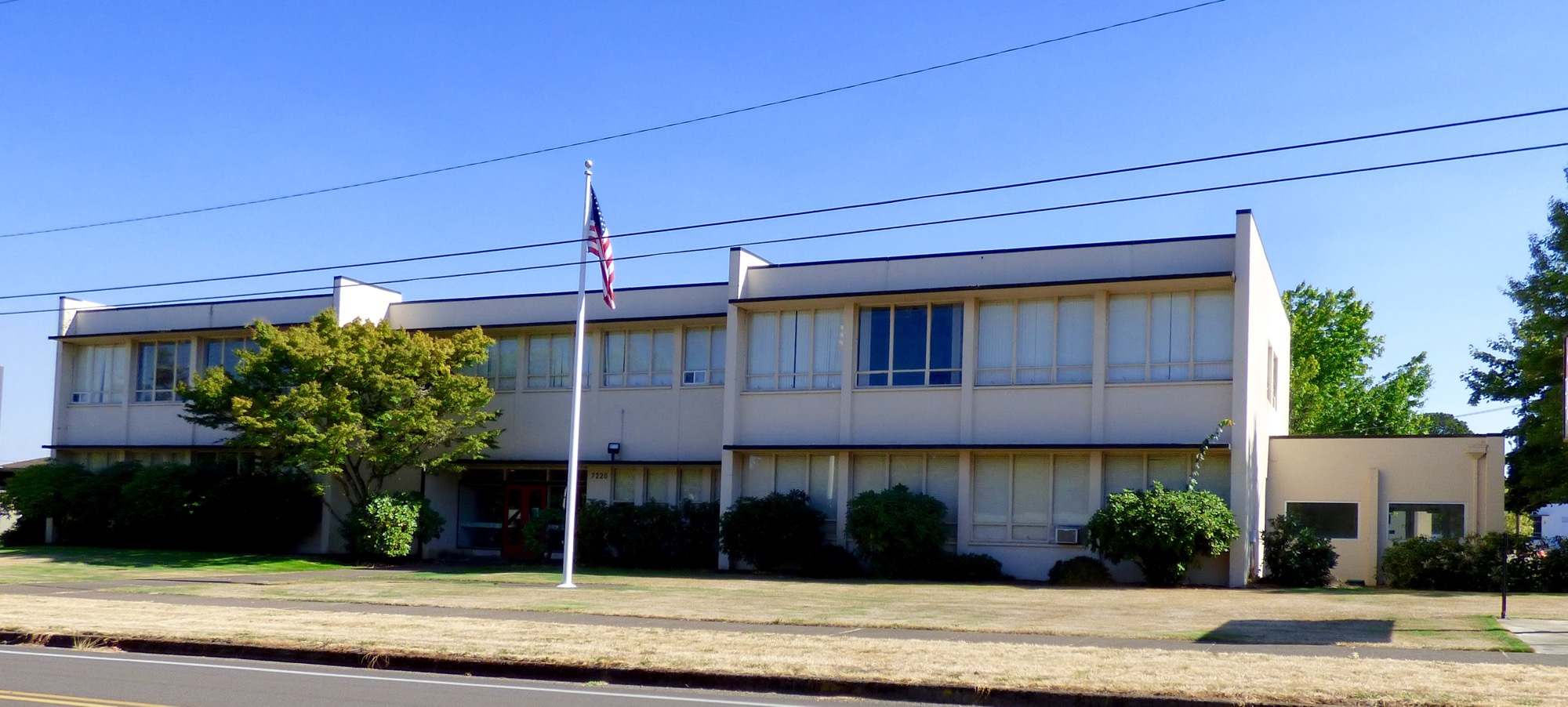

Location
- 7220 NE Arnold Avenue; Corvallis, Benton County, Oregon 97330; United States; 44.670925°N 123.216358°W

Information
- Type: Private
- Religious affiliation: Christian
- Opened: 1979
- Superintendent: Lance Villers
- CEEB code: 380214
- NCES School ID: 01931979
- Principal: Erik Ritchard,
- Grades: Pre K-12
- Enrollment: 611
- Colors: Red, White, and Black
- Athletics conference: OSAA Mountain Valley Conference 3A
- Mascot: Eagles
- Team name: The Eagles
- Accreditation: NWAC
- Affiliation: ACSI
- Website: www.santiamchristian.org

Santiam Christian Schools is a private pre K-12 Christian school in Adair Village, Oregon, United States.

Opened in 1979, the school has been accredited through the Northwest Accreditation Commission since 1993, and the Association of Christian Schools International.

== History ==
Santiam Christian currently resides on the previous location of Camp Adair. Several of Camp Adair's buildings are in use by Santiam Christian. All that really remains is the E. E. Wilson Wildlife Area. In 1978, Parents began planning to establish a Christian highschool. Santiam Christian High School was founded in 1979. SC offered grades 9, 10 and 11 with an enrollment of 55 students. In June 1980, Santiam Christian moved to Adair Village. In 1981, SC graduated its first class of 20 students. In 1986, the purchase of 12 buildings and 16.5 acres from US Government was finalized for $1. In 1991, Heritage Christian Elementary officially merged with SC adding grades K-6.

== Accreditation ==
Santiam Christian High School is fully accredited by the Association of Christian Schools International (ACSI) and Northwest Accreditation Commission (NWAC), and meets all requirements for graduation of the Oregon State Department of Education.

== High school ==
=== High school activities ===
Santiam Christian is involved with Future Farmers of America, International Missions Trips, and other electives courses and extra-curricular activities.

=== High school sports ===
Sports offered to students include: Football, Volleyball, Boys and Girls Soccer, Cross Country, Boys and Girls Basketball, Wrestling, Track & Field, Baseball, and Softbal. The school competes as part of the OSAA's Mountain Valley Conference.

=== Athletic achievements ===
Member of Oregon School Activities Association (OSAA) – 3A Division/Mountain Valley Conference. Sports include: Football, Volleyball, Cross-Country, Soccer, Basketball, Wrestling, Baseball, Softball, Track, and Cheer-leading.

33 Oregon State Championships and 81 League (District) Championships in a variety of sports

=== Notable alumni ===
- Shelly Boshart Davis - Oregon House of Representatives
- Isaac Seumalo - NFL football player, Super Bowl champion, Philadelphia Eagles

=== Transportation ===
Bus routes are provided into Albany, Corvallis, Monmouth, Dallas, Independence, and Salem.

== Middle school extracurricular activities ==
Students in middle school can become involved with the Junior Players Drama, LEGO Robotics, SC Boy Scout Troop 516, elective courses, Chorale, and Junior High Band, and other activities.
