= Hill college =

Hill college may refer to:

- One of a number of colleges of Durham University on Elvet Hill
- One of a number of colleges of the University of Cambridge on Castle Hill
- Hill College, Texas, USA

== See also ==
- College Hill (disambiguation)
