= Corvallis High School (Oregon) =

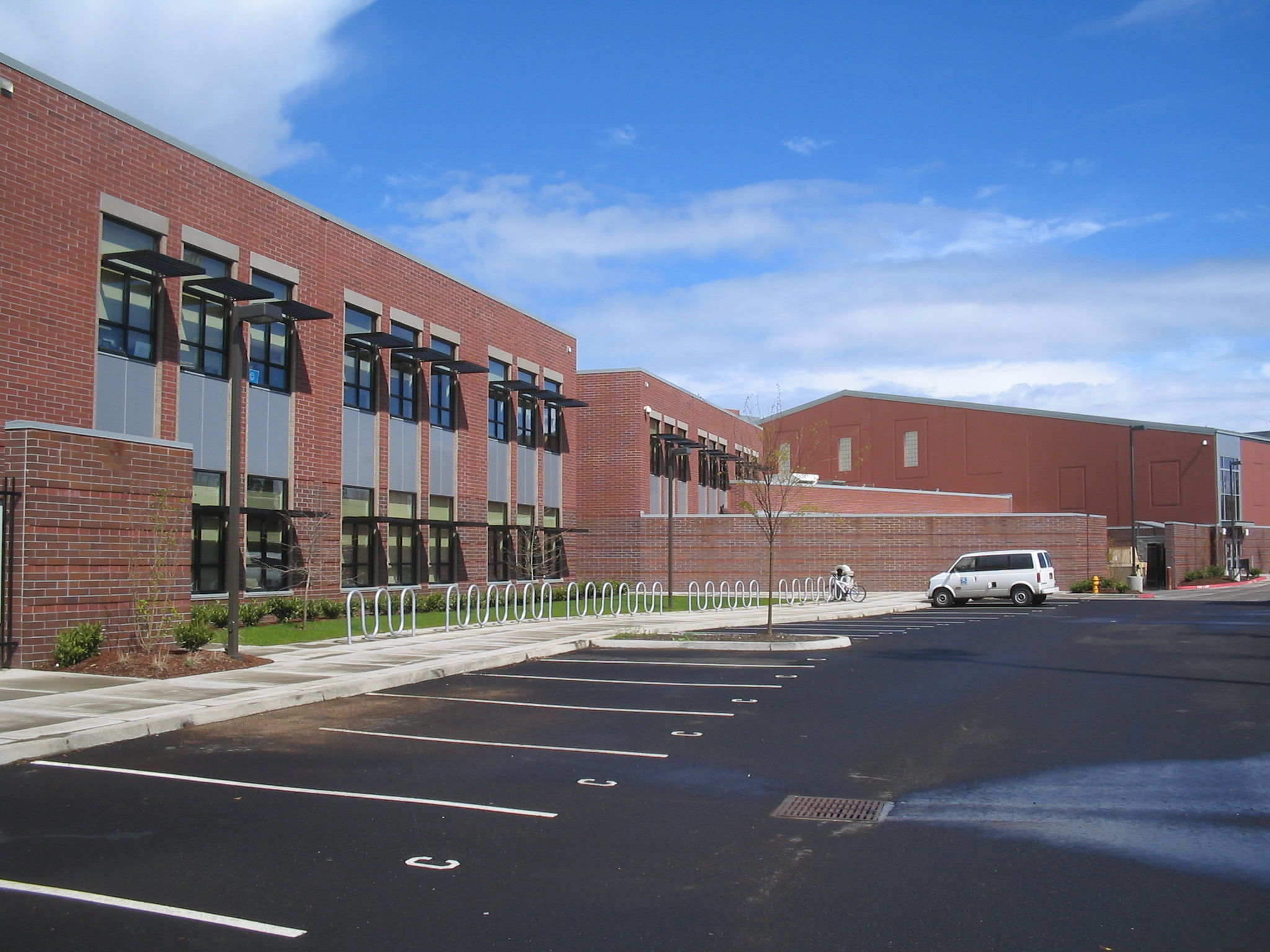

Location
- 1400 NW Buchanan Ave. Corvallis, Oregon 97330; United States; 44.575°N 123.269°W

Information
- Type: Public
- Established: 1910 (1935, 2005)
- School district: Corvallis S.D. (509J)
- Principal: Matt Boring
- Faculty: 49.56 (on an FTE basis)
- Grades: 9–12
- Enrollment: 1,255 (2023–2024)
- Student to teacher ratio: 25.32
- Colors: Columbia blue, navy, and white
- Athletics conference: OSAA 5A-3 Mid-Willamette Conference
- Mascot: Spartan
- Team name: Spartans
- Newspaper: High-O-Scope
- Yearbook: Chintimini
- Elevation: 230 ft (70 m) AMSL
- Website: chs.csd509j.net

Corvallis High School (CHS) is a four-year public secondary school in Corvallis, Oregon, United States. Originally established in 1910, the high school sat between the downtown area of Corvallis and Oregon State University. In 1935, a new school was built on what was then considered the far northern edge of the town on approximately 25 acres. In 2005, a third structure was built on the site of the former one, in what is now considered a central part of the city. Corvallis High School is one of two traditional secondary schools in the Corvallis School District, the other being Crescent Valley High School on the northern edge of the city.

== Building ==
=== 1910 structure ===
The original Corvallis High School was opened in February 1910 on 6th Street between Monroe Avenue and Madison Avenue, becoming the first dedicated high school in Corvallis. Prior to the construction, all grades were housed in Corvallis Central School, which was built in 1889 and was located one block west on 7th Street. The new high school was built in an Arts and Crafts style. The structure was built of masonry and featured two stories on top of a daylight basement. After only one year open, administration had already decided that the school was not large enough. A $40,000 bond measure was passed to expand the existing structure.

In 1917, an expanded and remodeled building was opened. The Arts and Crafts styling from the original building did not remain with the remodel and was changed to a Beaux-Arts style facade. The remodeled school had 22 classrooms as well as a gymnasium that doubled as an auditorium.

The schools population continued to grow. In 1920 a two-room portable classroom was added. In the 1930s, Corvallis High School had reached a population of 650 students in a structure that was intended for 400. It was decided that a larger school was needed.

When the 1935 high school opened, the 1910 building was converted to use as the junior high school until it was destroyed by fire in 1946.

=== 1935 structure ===
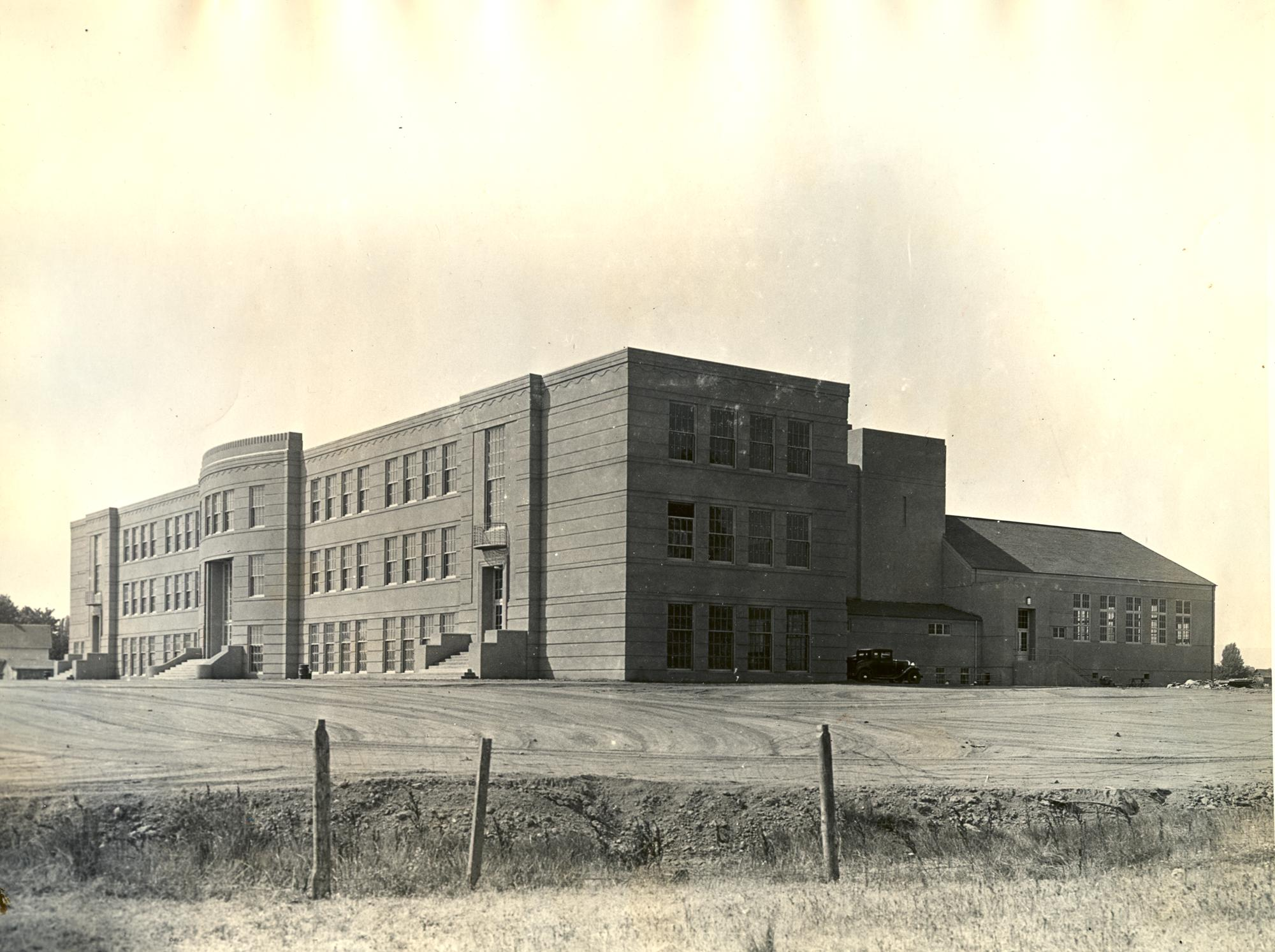
1935 structure right before opening

In 1933, the citizens of Corvallis passed a local bond to pay for the construction. This allowed the school district to apply for a Public Works Administration grant and loan, which was awarded in January 1934. The Portland firm of Whitehouse, Stanton, and Church was selected to design the new school. The Corvallis School District selected the site for the new high school on 11th Street, on the far northwest edge of town. The new Art Deco structure was completed in 1935. The project cost $316,000. The building was expanded multiple times in the 50s and 60s, with the addition of the science and library wing as well as the cafeteria and a large gym addition.

In the spring of 2000, after the district finished a seismic analysis of its 17 schools, it was decided that the building was unsafe for student use. It was decided that the replacement should be built on the existing site, favoring the central location over the opportunity to gain more land at an alternative location. This decision also required the old building to be demolished, which upset some citizens who believed the building was a historic treasure.

In an effort to save the structure, the building was nominated and added to the National Register of Historic Places in 2003. However, in the spring of 2004, construction began on the new building and the historic building was later demolished, and thus it was removed from the register. Several small architectural items from the original school were salvaged and used in the new building, including two brass chandeliers from the school's original auditorium, and two wrought iron "Juliet"-style decorative balconies from the school's east-facing facade, which were integrated into the new theater.

=== 2005 structure ===
After the seismic analysis in 2000, it was decided that a new high school needed to be built. The citizens of Corvallis passed an $86.4 million bond measure in 2002 to replace the high school as well as two middle schools, and also to update and renovate other schools in the district. Construction began in 2004 on the same lot as the second building in the old student parking lot, tennis courts, and football field/track, while classes continued in the old school. The second Corvallis High School structure was torn down in the summer of 2005 and was replaced with a softball field and a parking lot. The original front parking lot still remains, as well as several auxiliary buildings along Dixon Creek that were built in the 1960s.

This third Corvallis High School building, facing Buchanan Street, was opened in the fall of 2005. Originally slated to be opened in January 2006, construction was far enough along to allow the 2005–06 school year to start in the new structure while construction continued on-site until the spring of 2006. The cost of construction for the 230,000-square-foot (21,000 m^{2}) school was $46 million. Dull Olsen Weekes Architects of Portland designed it. Conscientious effort was made to build an energy-efficient, sustainable school, achieving a LEED silver rating for high performance buildings. The school is expected to use 30% less energy than one built to standard Oregon code.

== Academics ==
In 2018, 89% of the school's seniors received a high school diploma. Of 327 students, 304 graduated, with only 23 dropping out.

== Athletics ==
Corvallis High currently competes in the OSAA 5A-3 Mid-Willamette Conference.

Fall sports	Winter sports	Spring sports
Football	Basketball (boys')	Baseball
Soccer (boys')	Basketball (girls')	Softball
Soccer (girls')	Wrestling	Track and field (boys')
Volleyball (girls')	Swimming (boys')	Track and field (girls')
Cross country (boys')	Swimming (girls')	Golf (boys')
Cross country (girls')	Cheerleading	Golf (girls')
Cheerleading	Bowling - club	Tennis (boys')
	Alpine skiing (boys') - club	Tennis (girls')
	Alpine skiing (girls') - club	Lacrosse (boys') - club
	Cross-country skiing - club	Lacrosse (girls') - club
		Equestrian Team - club

=== National championships ===
- Football: 1922 national runner-up; lost national championship game to Scott High School (Ohio) 32–0
- Chess: 1979 National Champions

=== State championships ===
- Boys' cross country: 1965, 1966
- Football: 1922 (national runner-up to Scott, OH High School), 1970, 1978, 1979, 1983, and 2006
- Boys' soccer: 1995, 2009, 2018
- Girls' volleyball: 1979, 1980, 1981, 1983, 2018
- Boys' basketball: 1936, 1948, 1970, 1980, 1984, 2011, 2012
- Boys' swimming: 2011
- Wrestling: 1965, 1967
- Girls' alpine skiing: 2007
- Boys' baseball: 1971, 1986
- Boys' golf: 1942, 1943, 1944, 1950, 1962, 1965, 2010, 2011, 2022
- Girls' tennis: 1966, 2015, 2016, 2017, 2018, 2019
- Girls' track and field: 1990
- Choir: 2015, 2016, 2017
- Chess: 1972, 1977, 1979 (national championship)

== Activities ==
=== Newspaper ===
The school's newspaper, the High-O-Scope, was established in 1920.

=== Yearbook ===
The school's yearbook is the Chintimini.

=== FIRST Robotics ===
Founded by CHS students in time for the 2002 FIRST Robotics Competition season, Team 997 Spartan Robotics provides a hands-on program for high school students to learn about STEM in a competitive sports-like environment. In their 2002 rookie season, they won the rookie all-star award. Spartan Robotics was ranked fifth in the nation during the 2007 FIRST Championship at Atlanta, Georgia, after winning at both the Portland and Sacramento Regionals. Team 997 ranked first in the 2010 Autodesk Oregon regional competition, making it to Atlanta for a second time. The team also received the FIRST cooperation award at the 2012 Oregon regionals. In 2014 the team competed in four events, to district qualifiers which earned them a spot at the PNW District Championship where they further qualified to go to St. Louis to compete in the 2014 FIRST World championships a fourth time.

=== Choir ===
The Corvallis High School choir program includes five choirs: Cantus, a non-audition tenor and bass ensemble; Altum, a non-audition treble choir; Meraki, an audition treble choir; Concert Choir, an audition choir for all voice parts; and Spartacapella, an a cappella ensemble for all voice parts. Concert Choir won state championships in 2015, 2016, and 2017, and placed fifth in 2018.

== Notable alumni ==
Corvallis High School has a number of notable alumni, including:

- Brad Badger (class of 1993), former NFL offensive tackle/guard
- Sam Baker (class of 1949), former NFL running back, placekicker, and punter
- Brad Bird (class of 1975), animator, writer, and director (The Incredibles, The Iron Giant, Ratatouille)
- Meredith Brooks, singer, songwriter, and producer; known for her hit song "Bitch" (peaked at No. 2 on the Billboard Hot 100 in 1997)
- Jerry Brudos (class of 1957), Serial killer known as the Lust Killer and Shoe Fetish Slayer
- Linda Crew (class of 1969), author; most notably Children of the River
- Grace DeMoss, former professional golfer
- Christopher L. Eisgruber (class of 1979), legal scholar and president of Princeton University
- Jon Francis (class of 1982), former NFL running back
- Dave Gambee (class of 1954), former NBA small forward (1958 - 1970)
- Bob Gilder (class of 1969), professional golfer and currently a member of the Champions Tour
- Kevin Gregg (class of 1997), former MLB pitcher
- John Hart (class of 1950), former television journalist
- Jon Krakauer (class of 1972), climber and author of Into Thin Air, Into the Wild, Eiger Dreams, and Under the Banner of Heaven
- Jay Locey (class of 1973), football coach, former head football coach of the Lewis & Clark Pioneers and Linfield College
- Hector Macpherson, Jr. (class of 1936), state senator who authored the Oregon Land Conservation and Development Act of 1973
- Ben Masters (class of 1965), actor, best known for his portrayal of Julian Crane in daytime drama Passions
- David Metzger (class of 1978), composer, conductor, arranger, and orchestrator who has worked on many Disney Animation films
- Barbara Minty (class of 1971), Vogue top model of the 1970s and widow of actor Steve McQueen
- Rebecca Morris, broadcast, radio and print journalist, and The New York Times bestselling non-fiction author
- Sara Nelson (class of 1991), union leader and International President of the Association of Flight Attendants
- Naomi Pomeroy (class of 1993), chef and restaurateur
- Don Reynolds (class of 1971), former MLB player
- Harold Reynolds (class of 1979), former MLB second baseman and former ESPN broadcaster; currently working for MLB.com
- Mike Riley (class of 1971), football coach, current head coach of USFL New Jersey Generals
- Dave Roberts (class of 1969), former MLB third baseman, NCAA baseball Player of the Year and number 1 overall MLB draft selection in 1972
- Isaac Seumalo (class of 2012), current NFL offensive guard who won Super Bowl LII with the Philadelphia Eagles
- Robb Thomas (class of 1985), former NFL wide receiver
- Bob Welch (class of 1972), author and newspaper columnist
- Carl Wieman (class of 1969), recipient of the 2001 Nobel Prize in Physics for creation of the Bose-Einstein condensate
- Mike Zandofsky (class of 1983), former NFL offensive guard
