= Eddy Wilson =

Eddy Wilson may refer to:

- Eddy Elbridge Wilson (died 1961), member of the former Oregon State Game Commission, namesake of the E. E. Wilson Wildlife Area
- Eddy Wilson (American football) (born 1997), American football defensive tackle
