= Fairbanks House =

Fairbanks House may refer to:

- Fairbanks House (Fernandina Beach, Florida), listed on the National Register of Historic Places (NRHP)
- Fairbanks House (Dedham, Massachusetts), a U.S. National Historic Landmark, built in 1636 and purported to be the oldest wooden house in the U.S.
- Fairbanks-Williams House, Taunton, Massachusetts, NRHP-listed
- J. Leo Fairbanks House (Corvallis, Oregon), NRHP-listed
- J. Leo Fairbanks House (Salt Lake City, Utah), listed on the NRHP in Salt Lake City, Utah
- Granite LDS Ward Chapel-Avard Fairbanks Studio, Sandy, Utah, listed on the NRHP in Salt Lake County, Utah
- Fairbanks Museum, St. Johnsbury, Vermont, NRHP-listed
- Franklin Fairbanks House, St. Johnsbury, Vermont, listed on the NRHP in Caledonia County, Vermont
- Fairbanks Flats, Beloit, Wisconsin, NRHP-listed
