= Linda Crew =

American novelist

- Born: 1951 (age 74–75); Corvallis, Oregon, U.S.
- Education: University of Oregon
- Occupation: Author
- Spouse: Herb Crew (1974)
- Children: 3
- Writing career
- Genre: Young Adult fiction
- Notable work: Children of the River
- Website: www.lindacrew.com

Linda Crew (born 1951) is an American author based in Oregon. She is best known for Children of the River, first published in 1989, about a thirteen year old girl who flees Cambodia with her aunt's family, leaving her family behind for a better life in Oregon.

== Career ==
Crew's first book, a young adult novel Children of the River, was published in 1989. The book was very well received and has won several awards. Crew's writing ranges from children's books such as the "Nekomah Creek" series, to young adult historical novels with crossover appeal for older readers such as Brides of Eden: A True Story Imagined, Fire on the Wind, and A Heart for Any Fate: Westward to Oregon 1845. Ordinary Miracles, published by William Morrow in 1993, is an adult novel.

== Personal life ==
Crew grew up in Corvallis, Oregon, graduating from Corvallis High School. After high school, Crew studied at Lewis & Clark College. It was at Lewis & Clark where she first met her husband. Crew later graduated with a Bachelor of Arts in journalism from the University of Oregon, Phi Beta Kappa.

Crew resides in her hometown of Corvallis on a small farm with her husband. The couple has three children.

== Bibliography ==
- Children of the River (1989)
- Someday I'll Laugh About This (1990)
- Nekomah Creek (1991)
- Ordinary Miracles (1993)
- Nekomah Creek Christmas (1994)
- Fire on the Wind (1995)
- Long Time Passing (1997)
- Brides of Eden: A True Story Imagined (2001)
- A Heart for Any Fate: Westward to Oregon 1845 (2005) - Oregon Book Award 2005
- Accidental Addict: A True Story of Pain and Healing (2016)
- Wedding in Yangshuo: a Memoir Love, Language, and the Journey of a Lifetime to the Heart of China eBook (2017)
- Family Trees: A Novel of the Northwest (2021)

== See also ==
- Children's literature
- Young Adult literature
