= Adair Village, Oregon =

- City
- Location within Benton County and Oregon
- Coordinates: 44°40′15″N 123°12′58″W
- Country: United States
- State: Oregon
- County: Benton
- Incorporated: 1976

Government
  - Mayor: Bill Currier

Area
  - Total: 0.44 sq mi (1.15 km^{2})
  - Land: 0.44 sq mi (1.15 km^{2})
  - Water: 0 sq mi (0.00 km^{2})
- Elevation: 322 ft (98 m)

Population (2020)
  - Total: 994
  - Estimate (2023): 1,018
  - Density: 2,236.2/sq mi (863.42/km^{2})
- Time zone: UTC-8 (Pacific)
  - Summer (DST): UTC-7 (Pacific)
- ZIP code: 97330
- Area codes: 458 and 541
- FIPS code: 41-00275
- GNIS feature ID: 2409661
- Website: adairvillage.org

Adair Village is a city in Benton County, Oregon, United States. The population was 994 as of the 2020 U.S. census and estimated to be 1,018 as of 2023.

== History ==
Adair Village was named after the World War II military installation Camp Adair. When the war ended, the camp was closed and most of the buildings were removed, except for the hospital, which in 1946 was leased to Oregon State University for student and faculty housing. The university converted the hospital into apartments, a local government was organized, and the Adair Village post office was established in 1947.

When the postwar enrollment boom dwindled, Oregon State gave up its lease, and the United States Air Force maintained the base as a radar station. Adair Village post office closed in 1951, and Adair Air Force Station post office took its place from 1961 through 1969. The Air Force ceased operations and sold the property, with the individual houses being placed on the market. Adair Village incorporated in 1976. Adair Village city hall is one of the original World War II buildings.

== Geography ==
According to the United States Census Bureau, the city has a total area of 0.23 square miles (0.60 km^{2}), all of it land.

== Demographics ==
Historical population
Census	Pop.	Note	%±
1980	589		—
1990	554		−5.9%
2000	536		−3.2%
2010	840		56.7%
2020	994		18.3%
U.S. Decennial Census

The city is part of the Corvallis, Oregon, Metropolitan Statistical Area.

=== 2020 census ===
As of the 2020 census, Adair Village had a population of 994. The median age was 35.8 years. 26.2% of residents were under the age of 18 and 11.1% of residents were 65 years of age or older. For every 100 females there were 96.4 males, and for every 100 females age 18 and over there were 85.8 males age 18 and over.

0% of residents lived in urban areas, while 100.0% lived in rural areas.

There were 340 households in Adair Village, of which 46.8% had children under the age of 18 living in them. Of all households, 60.0% were married-couple households, 10.6% were households with a male householder and no spouse or partner present, and 22.4% were households with a female householder and no spouse or partner present. About 13.8% of all households were made up of individuals and 5.9% had someone living alone who was 65 years of age or older.

There were 359 housing units, of which 5.3% were vacant. Among occupied housing units, 67.6% were owner-occupied and 32.4% were renter-occupied. The homeowner vacancy rate was 0.9% and the rental vacancy rate was 9.0%.

Racial composition as of the 2020 census
Race	Number	Percent
White	784	78.9%
Black or African American	16	1.6%
American Indian and Alaska Native	13	1.3%
Asian	31	3.1%
Native Hawaiian and Other Pacific Islander	3	0.3%
Some other race	23	2.3%
Two or more races	124	12.5%
Hispanic or Latino (of any race)	107	10.8%

=== 2010 census ===
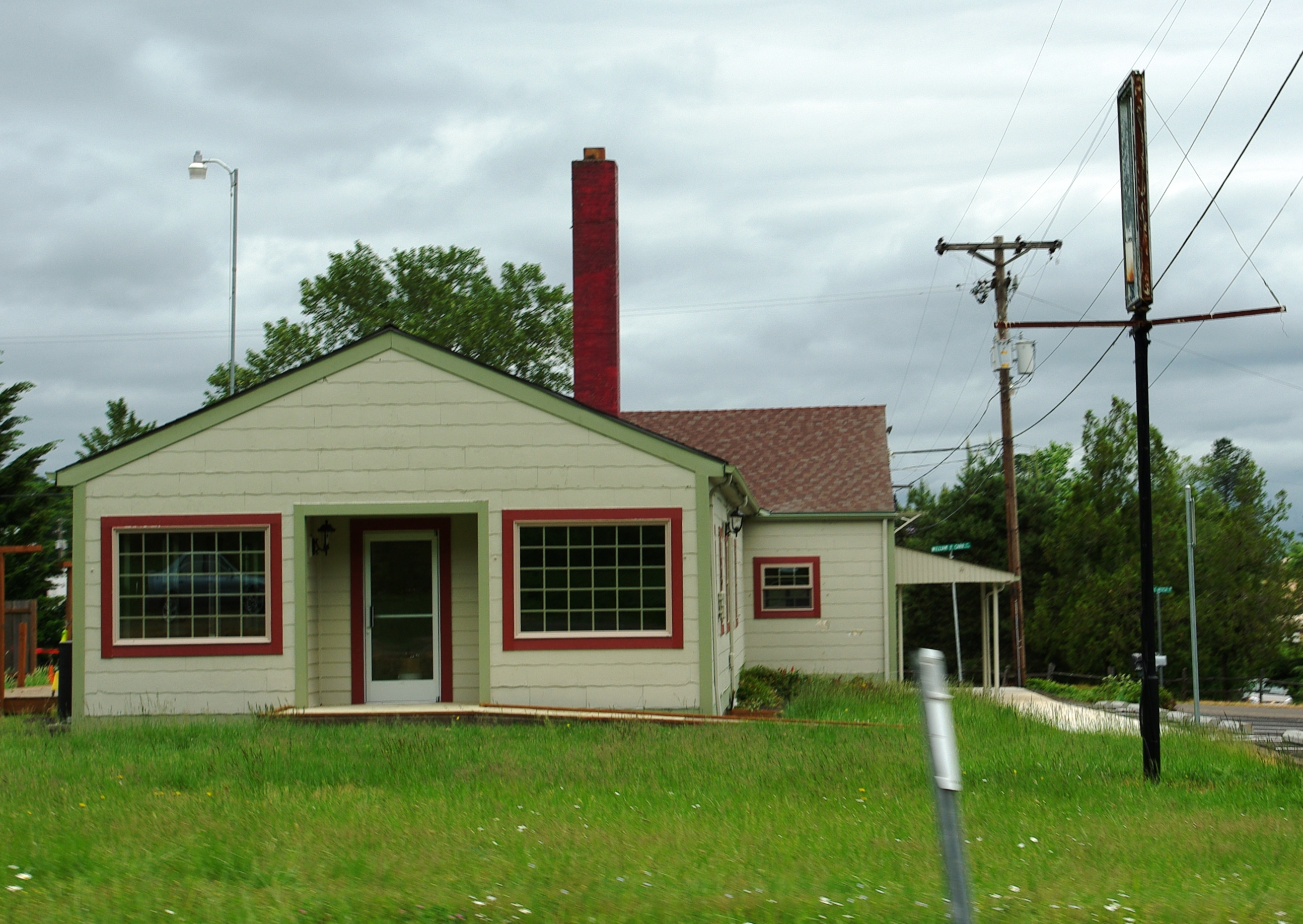
Building in Adair Village

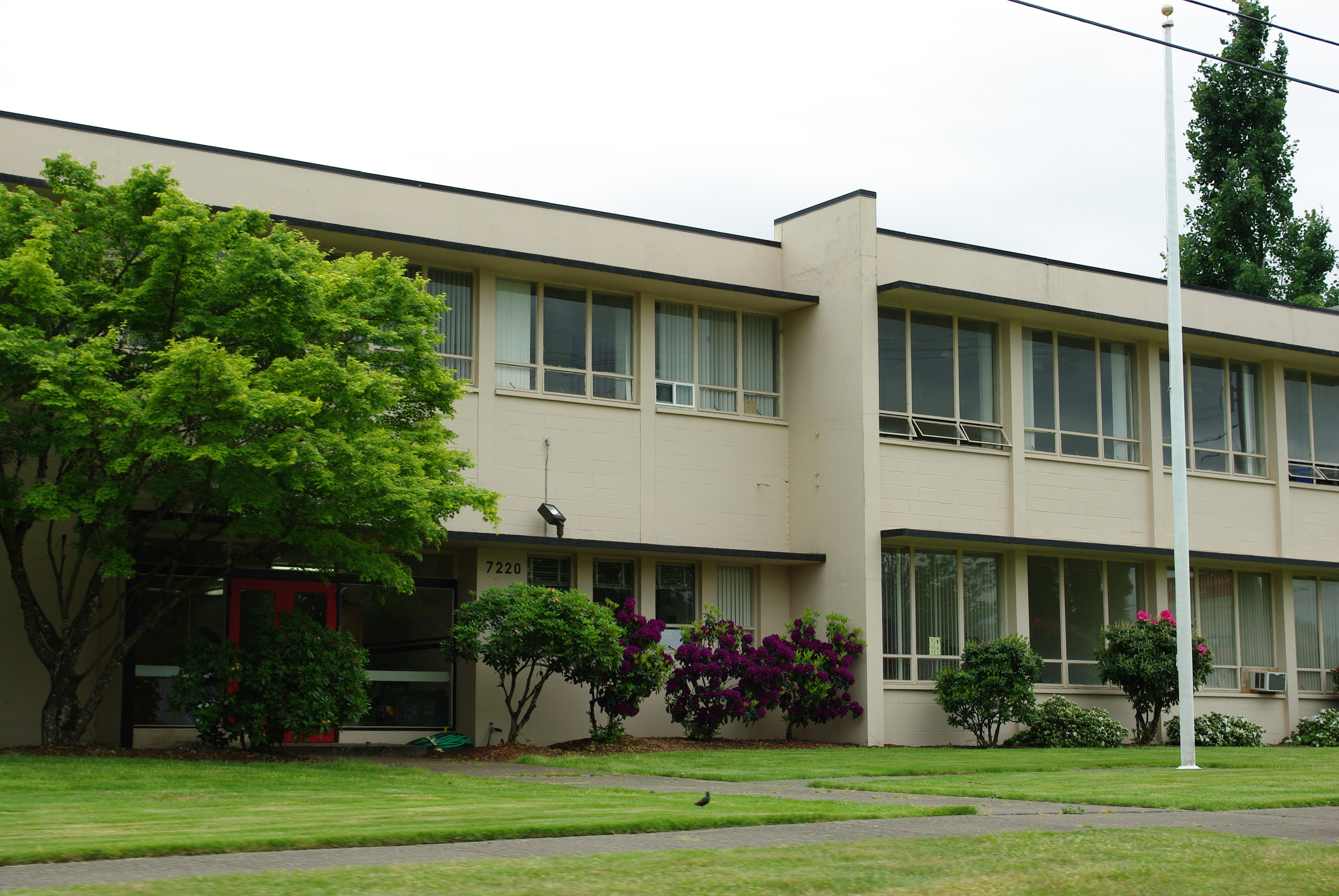
Santiam Christian in Adair Village

As of the census of 2010, there were 840 people, 279 households, and 227 families residing in the city. The population density was 3,652.2 inhabitants per square mile (1,410.1/km^{2}). There were 293 housing units at an average density of 1,273.9 per square mile (491.9/km^{2}). The racial makeup of the city was 88.5% White, 1.2% African American, 1.4% Native American, 1.9% Asian, 0.2% Pacific Islander, 0.8% from other races, and 6.0% from two or more races. Hispanic or Latino of any race were 6.7% of the population.

There were 279 households, of which 57.0% had children under the age of 18 living with them, 57.7% were married couples living together, 19.7% had a female householder with no husband present, 3.9% had a male householder with no wife present, and 18.6% were non-families. 12.9% of all households were made up of individuals, and 1.1% had someone living alone who was 65 years of age or older. The average household size was 3.01 and the average family size was 3.30.

The median age in the city was 30.6 years. 36.7% of residents were under the age of 18; 5.8% were between the ages of 18 and 24; 34% were from 25 to 44; 20% were from 45 to 64; and 3.6% were 65 years of age or older. The gender makeup of the city was 48.6% male and 51.4% female.

=== 2000 census ===
As of the census of 2000, there were 536 people, 170 households, and 140 families residing in the city. The population density was 2,250.3 inhabitants per square mile (868.8/km^{2}). There were 180 housing units at an average density of 755.7 per square mile (291.8/km^{2}). The racial makeup of the city was 87.87% White, 0.75% African American, 2.43% Native American, 1.31% Asian, 1.49% Pacific Islander, 1.12% from other races, and 5.04% from two or more races. Hispanic or Latino of any race were 4.48% of the population.

There were 170 households, out of which 52.4% had children under the age of 18 living with them, 64.1% were married couples living together, 12.9% had a female householder with no husband present, and 17.1% were non-families. 11.2% of all households were made up of individuals, and 2.4% had someone living alone who was 65 years of age or older. The average household size was 3.15 and the average family size was 3.40.

In the city, the population was spread out, with 35.4% under the age of 18, 9.5% from 18 to 24, 32.8% from 25 to 44, 19.0% from 45 to 64, and 3.2% who were 65 years of age or older. The median age was 28 years. For every 100 females, there were 98.5 males. For every 100 females age 18 and over, there were 87.0 males.

The median income for a household in the city was $49,000, and the median income for a family was $51,667. Males had a median income of $38,750 versus $29,286 for females. The per capita income for the city was $16,311. About 6.4% of families and 9.0% of the population were below the poverty line, including 9.8% of those under age 18 and none of those age 65 or over.

== Sites of interest ==
The Oregon Department of Fish and Wildlife-administered E. E. Wilson Wildlife Area forms the northern border of the city.

== Education ==
It is in the Corvallis School District 509J. It is zoned to Mountain View Elementary School, Cheldelin Middle School, and Crescent Valley High School.

Private schools:

- Santiam Christian School
