= Crescent Valley High School =

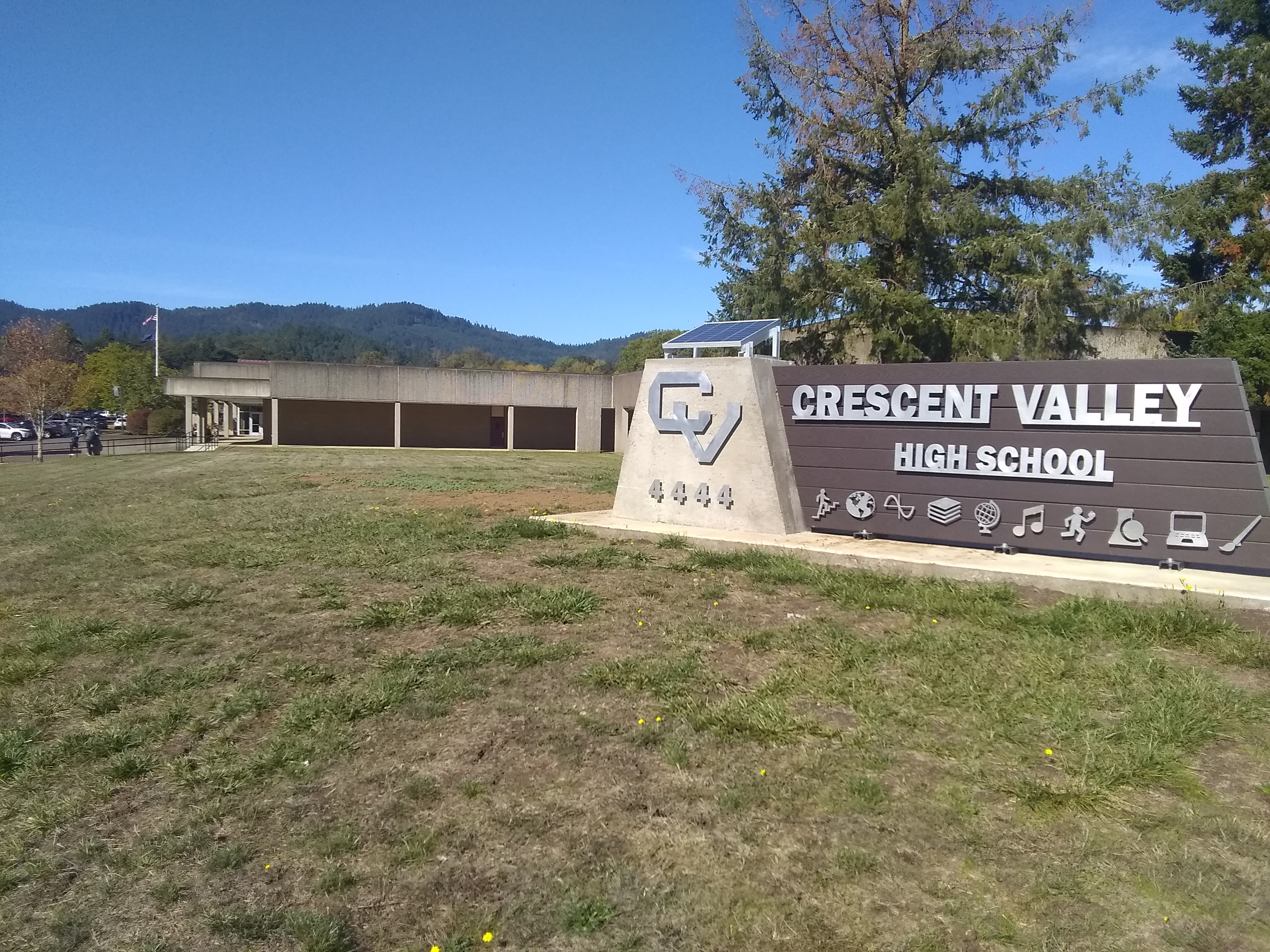

Location
- 4444 Northwest Highland Drive; Corvallis, Oregon 97330; United States; 44.616°N 123.263°W

Information
- Motto: "Commitment to Excellence." and "Raider Nation, home of the Rowdy Raiders."
- Established: 1971
- School district: Corvallis School District 509J
- Principal: Aaron McKee
- Teaching staff: 35.34 (FTE)
- Grades: 9–12
- Enrollment: 942 (2023–2024)
- Student to teacher ratio: 26.66
- Colors: Cardinal, gold and black
- Athletics conference: OSAA 5A-3 Mid-Willamette Conference
- Mascot: Rowdy the Raider
- Team name: Raiders
- Rival: Corvallis High School; South Albany High School
- Newspaper: Crescent Crier (https://thecrescentcrier.com/)
- Yearbook: Revolutionary
- Website: cvhs.csd509j.net/

Crescent Valley High School (CV or CVHS) is a four-year public secondary school in unincorporated Benton County, Oregon, with a Corvallis post office address. Opened in 1971 in a rural location north of the city, it is one of the two traditional high schools of the Corvallis School District. Aaron McKee has been the principal of the school As of 2017. Its attendance boundary includes Adair Village and pieces of Corvallis.

There are two student-run media broadcasting groups, of which students may participate in: The Crescent Crier as the school newspaper and CVTV (abbreviation of Crescent Valley TeleVision) as the schools broadcast news channel.

== Academics ==
In the 2024-2025 school year, the school had a total enrollment of 858 students. The racial makeup of the student body was 69% White, 12% Hispanic or Latino, 10% multiracial, 7% Asian, and 1% Black. Less than 1% of the student body identified as American Indian/Alaska Native or Native Hawaiian/Pacific Islander, respectively. 15% of the student body were classified as experiencing poverty and 12% were disabled students. 89% of the school's seniors received their high school diploma on time; 96% of the cohort graduated with a diploma or GED within five years, and 75% of the graduating class pursued higher-level education There is a special-education WINGS program in place at the high school and within the school district that the school is located in for disabled students to attempt to earn a diploma after graduation if they were not able to get one after five years.

Crescent Valley offers Spanish and English classes as of the 2025-26 school year and previously offered German and French before then, yet the students still in German and French classes may still finish the courses.

=== Academic awards ===
In 2010, a student at the school was honored as a Presidential Scholar, one of three from Oregon. There have been two other Presidential Scholars from this school in the past ten years.

The school received a silver ranking from U.S. News & World Report's 2010 "America's Best High Schools" survey.

== Athletics ==
Assistant principal Jon Strowbridge is also the current Athletic Director of CVHS. Crescent Valley High School athletic teams compete in the OSAA 5A-3 Mid-Willamette Conference.

State championships:

- Baseball: 2022
- Boys' golf: 1995, 2007, 2019
- Band: 1994, 2009 (5A Band), 2009 (String Orchestra)†, 2012, 2013, 2015, 2016
- Boys' soccer: 1979†, 1996
- Boys' swimming: 2007, 2022, 2025
- Boys' tennis: 2013†, 2014†, 2022
- Cheerleading: 1993, 1999, 2024, 2025
- Choir: 2009
- Girls' basketball: 1978, 2022
- Girls' gymnastics: 1980
- Girls' soccer: 2018, 2019
- Girls' swimming: 2007, 2008, 2009, 2010, 2011, 2019, 2020
- Girls' track and field: 2022
- Girls' tennis: 1977, 2022, 2023, 2024, 2026
- Girls' cross country: 1987
- Volleyball: 2022, 2023, 2026
- Wrestling: 2019, 2020, 2021^, 2022

(†=Tied with one or more schools)
(^=Oregon Westling Association State Tournament due to COVID-19 pandemic)

== Notable alumni ==
- Chris Botti (1981), trumpet player
- Meghna Chakrabarti (1993), national journalist, public radio host (On Point, Here & Now), podcast host (Modern Love)
- Robert Garrigus, golfer
- Talanoa Hufanga (2018), NFL football player, PAC-12 Defensive Player of the Year, Denver Broncos safety
- Dave Johnson (1981), Olympic decathlete
- David Krane (1990), CEO of GV
- Omar Speights (2019), NFL player, Los Angeles Rams Linebacker

=== Faculty ===
- Doug Riesenberg, NFL player and Super Bowl champion with the New York Giants

== See also ==
- List of high schools in Oregon
- Corvallis High School
