= Jon Francis =

American football player (born 1964)

No. 35
- Position: Running back

Personal information
- Born: June 21, 1964 (age 62); Corvallis, Oregon, U.S.
- Listed height: 5 ft 11 in (1.80 m)
- Listed weight: 207 lb (94 kg)

Career information
- High school: Corvallis
- College: Boise State
- NFL draft: 1986: 7th round, 184th overall pick

Career history
- New York Giants (1986)*; New England Patriots (1987)*; Los Angeles Rams (1987)
- * Offseason or practice squad member only

Career NFL statistics
- Rushing yards: 138
- Rushing average: 3.9
- Receptions: 8
- Receiving yards: 38
- Receiving touchdowns: 2
- Stats at Pro Football Reference

Jon Charles Naekauna Francis (born June 21, 1964) is an American former professional football player. He is the son of former Green Bay Packer Joe Francis, and half-brother of Detroit Lions 2007 second-round draft pick Ikaika Alama-Francis.

== Early life and college ==
Francis attended Corvallis High School in Corvallis, Oregon and starred in football. Francis played strong safety and tailback for the Spartans. His senior year rushing total of 1702 yards in 1981 was the school record until 2004.

Francis played his freshman season at Colorado State University. His sophomore season, he played defensive back at Taft College. Francis transferred to Boise State to finish out his college career. In those two seasons at Boise State, Francis ran for a combined 2,172 yards. Both seasons earned him a spot as a First Team Big Sky Conference All-Star.

== Professional career ==
Francis was drafted in the seventh round of the 1986 NFL draft by the New York Giants. Francis injured his ankle in a pre-season practice. The injury heavily limited his ability to show his talent, and he was subsequently cut by the team in August 1986.

Francis signed with the New England Patriots in 1987, but was unable to make the team's roster and was cut in the pre-season.

After the completion of week 2 of the 1987 season, the NFLPA chose to go on strike. Francis signed with the Los Angeles Rams as a replacement player during the four-game strike. As a replacement, he saw his first live game carries. When the strike ended, Francis was the only replacement player to remain on the team. Jon played in 9 games and had 35 carries for 138 yards and 8 receptions for 38 yards and 2 touchdowns. Francis was brought back to camp by the Rams in 1988, but was cut near the end of August before the season began.
