= John Bexell House =

Historic house in Oregon, United States

- U.S. National Register of Historic Places
- U.S. Historic district – Contributing property
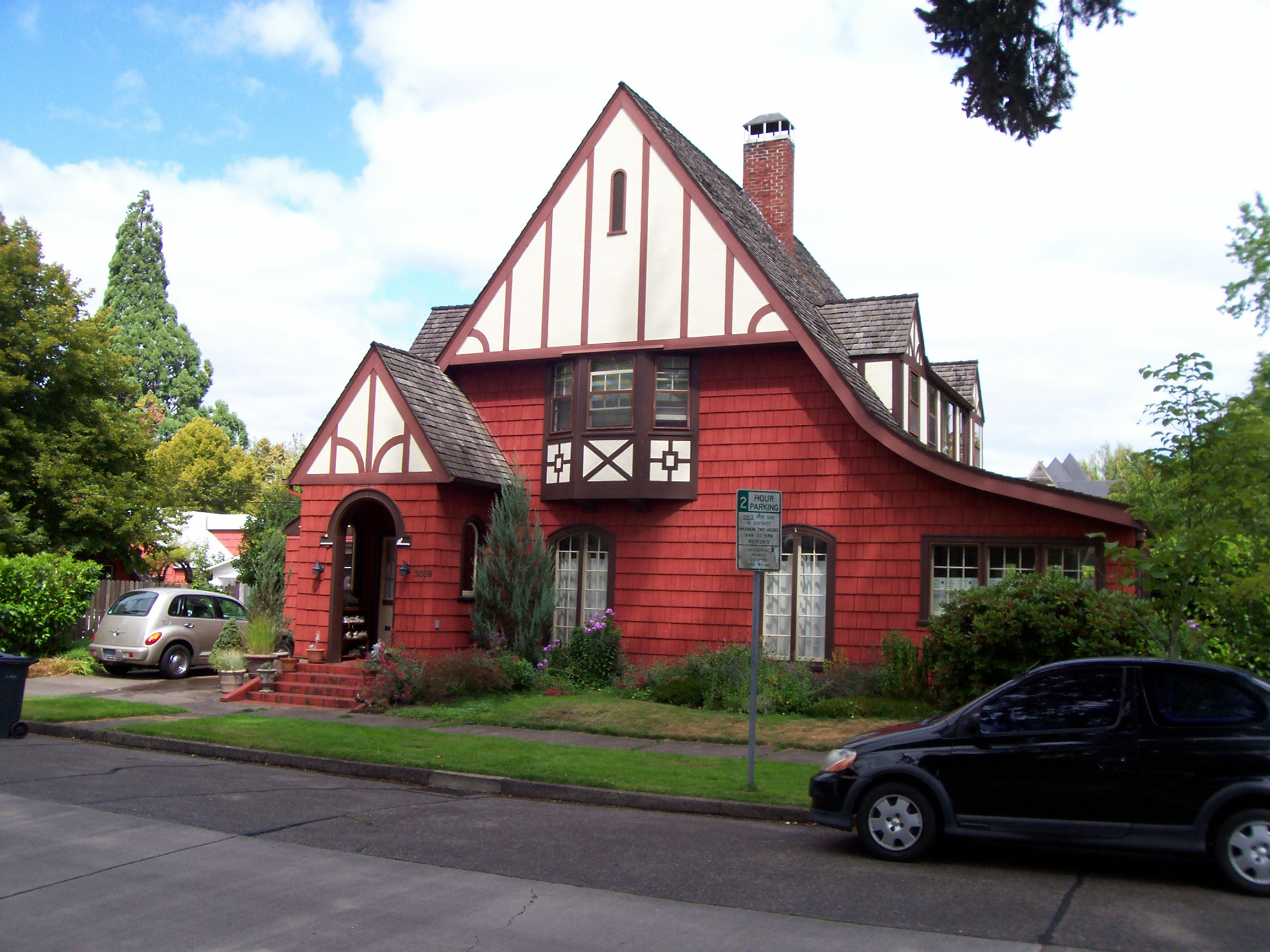
- The house's exterior in 2009

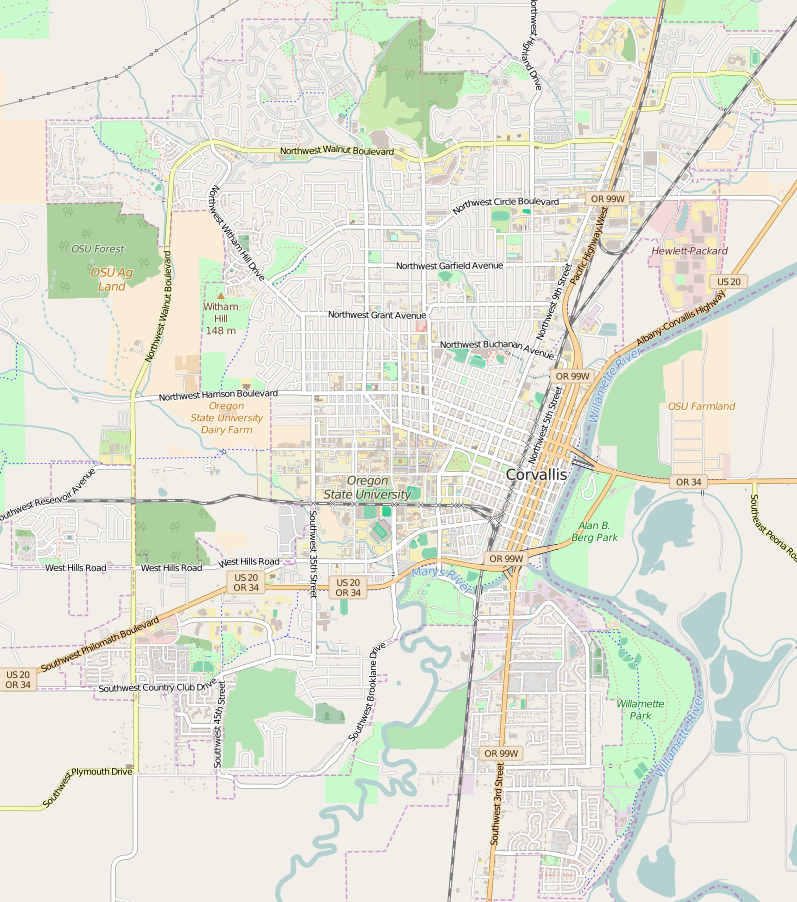
- Location within Corvallis OR Location within Oregon
- Location: 3009 NW Van Buren Avenue; Corvallis, Oregon
- Coordinates: 44°34′15″N 123°17′06″W
- Area: 0.1 acres (0.040 ha)
- Built: 1926
- Architect: Bennes & Herzog
- Architectural style: Tudor Revival, Norman farmhouse
- Part of: College Hill West Historic District (ID02000827)
- NRHP reference No.: 92000064
- Added to NRHP: February 26, 1992

The John Bexell House, located in Corvallis, Oregon, is a house listed on the National Register of Historic Places located at 3009 NW Van Buren Avenue. The house is located in College Hill West Historic District.

Architecturally, it is a single-story block with a very steep (16/12) gable roof. It was designed in 1926 by architects Bennes & Herzog, with John Virginius Bennes believed to have served as principal on the project.

== See also ==
- National Register of Historic Places listings in Benton County, Oregon
- College Hill West Historic District
