= Casa Musica =

Historic house in Corvallis, Oregon, US

- Alternative names: Paul and Lilian Petri House

General information
- Type: Single-family home
- Architectural style: Tudor revival
- Location: 3560 NW Tyler Ave, Corvallis, Oregon, United States
- Year built: 1927

Design and construction
- Architect: C. A. Heilman
- Casa Musica
- U.S. Historic district – Contributing property
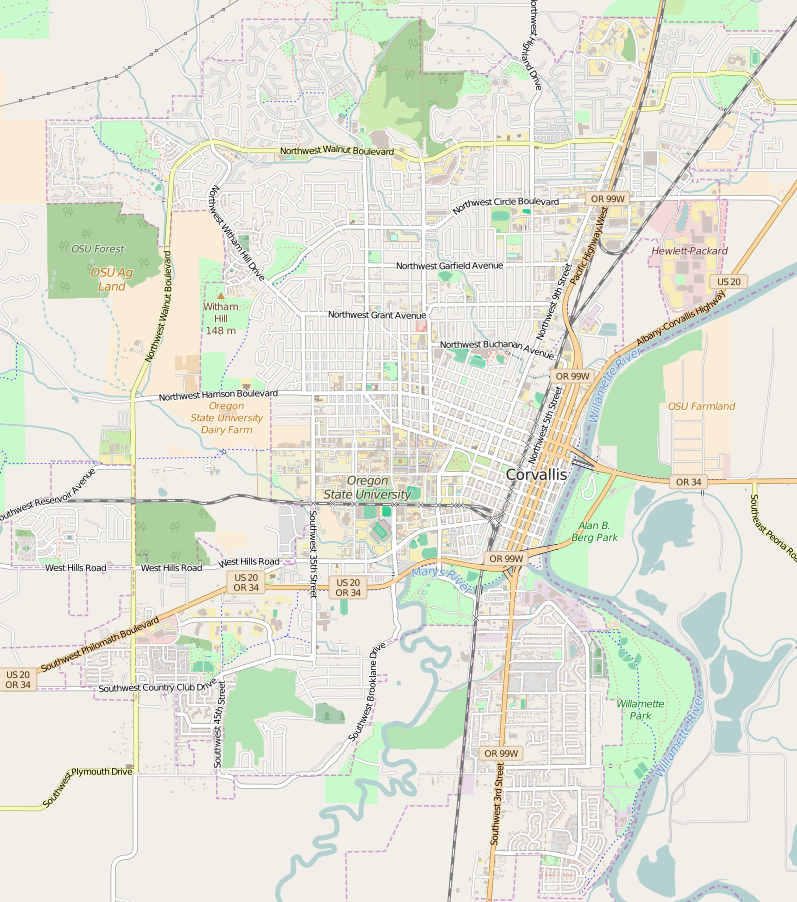
- Location within Oregon Location within Corvallis OR
- Coordinates: 44°34′21.13″N 123°17′26.41″W
- Part of: College Hill West Historic District (ID02000827)

Casa Musica is a historic house in Corvallis, Oregon, United States, located in College Hill West Historic District at 3560 NW Tyler Avenue. It was built in 1927, designed by Los Angeles based architect C. A. Heilman for Paul and Lilian Petri, who were both music teachers. The couple named the house "Casa Musica", which means "music house" in Latin.

The house is built out of wood with a stucco exterior with wood shingles and decorative half-timbering in places. It sits upon a concrete foundation.

On the north side of the house, there is a large hall that extends west with vaulted ceilings and a small balcony. The hall was used for dinners, as well as musical performances and recitals such as singing and piano. The room usually the location for Mrs. Petri's students' recitals, as well as the quintet she was a part of.

On December 13th, 2006, a wrought iron sign that hung above the front door was stolen from its place above the door.

== See also ==
- Oregon State University
