= Corvallis School District =

School district in Oregon, US

Logo

The Corvallis School District (509J) is a school district headquartered in Corvallis, Oregon.

The district includes an area of about 190 square miles (490 km^{2}), including Corvallis and Adair Village, along with large portions of unincorporated Benton County, as well as sections of unincorporated Linn County. As of 2016, the district had about 6,600 students at two high schools, two middle schools, eight elementary schools, one charter school, and one alternative school. The two high schools in the district are Corvallis High School and Crescent Valley High School.

== History ==
In 1850 the first school was established in Marysville (renamed Corvallis in 1853). Teacher of the school was A.G. Hovey.

== Demographics ==
In the 2009 school year, the district had 268 students classified as homeless by the Department of Education, or 4.0% of students in the district.

== Schools ==
Elementary schools

- Adams Elementary School
- Bessie Coleman Elementary School (Hoover/Husky Elementary School formerly)
- Franklin School (K-8)
- Garfield Elementary School
- Kathryn Jones Harrison Elementary School (Jefferson/Jaguar Elementary School formerly)
- Lincoln Elementary School
- Mountain View Elementary School
- Yaleborrow Heights Elementary - Postponed to Budget Cuts (Being built on North side of Corvallis)

Middle schools

- Corvallis Jr High ( SERVES THE ENTIRE CORVALLIS AREA AND PROSPER)
- Franklin School (K-8 school)

High schools

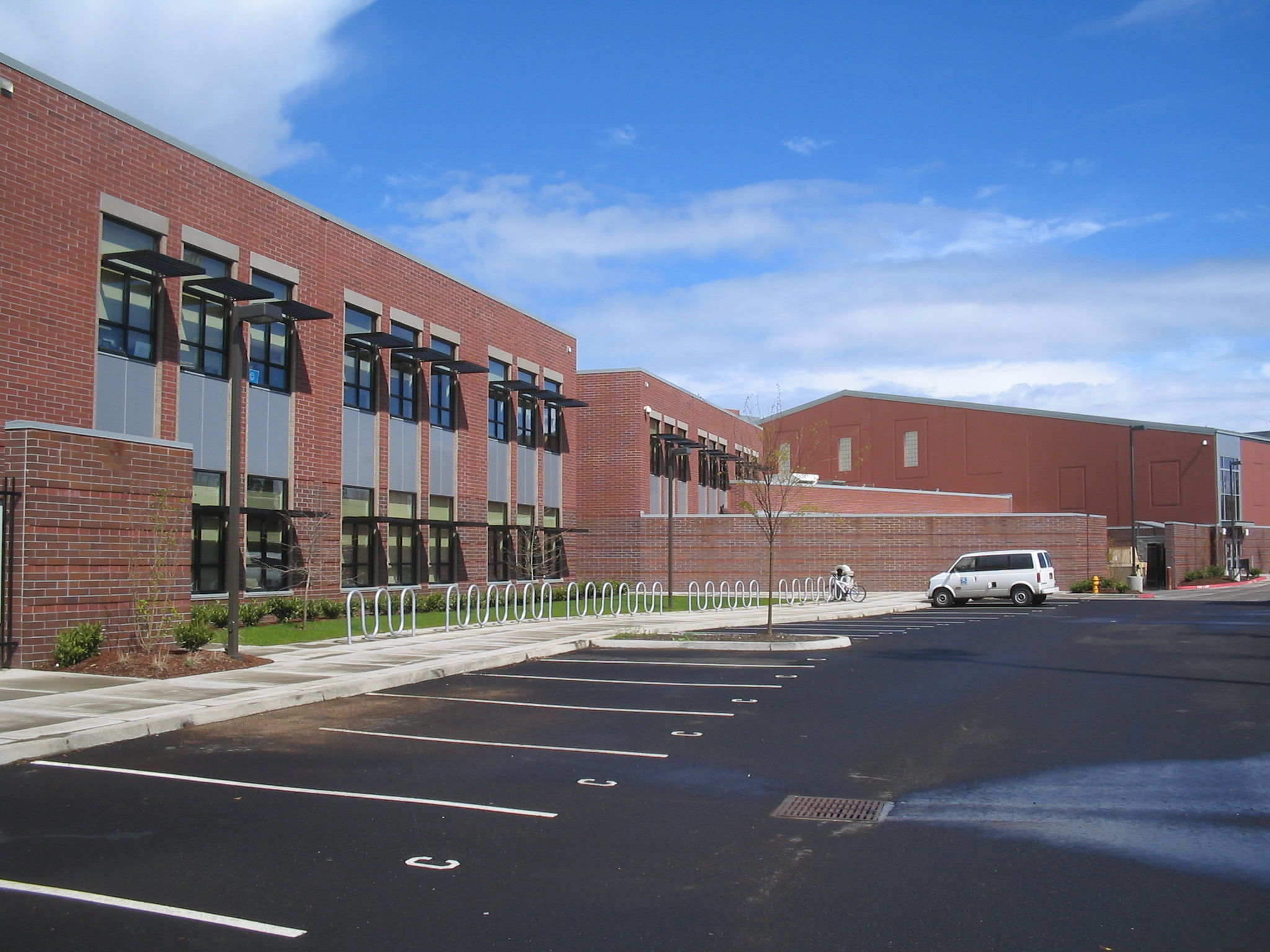
Corvallis High School

- Corvallis High School
- Crescent Valley High School
- College Hill High School

Charter schools

- Kings Valley Charter School

Other

- College Hill High Alternative School
- Bridges Middle School Alternative Program
- Urban Farm Program
- Post Graduate Scholars Program
- WINGS Special Education Transition Program
- Construction Program
- Corvallis Online School
- Outdoor School
- Summer School

== Former schools ==
- Cheldelin Middle School - Closed in 2026
- Highlandview Middle school - Closed in 2003
- Westernview Middle school - Closed in 2003
- Letitia Carson Elementary School - Closed in 2026 (formerly Wilson/Wildcat Elementary School)
