= Isaac Seumalo =

American football player (born 1993)

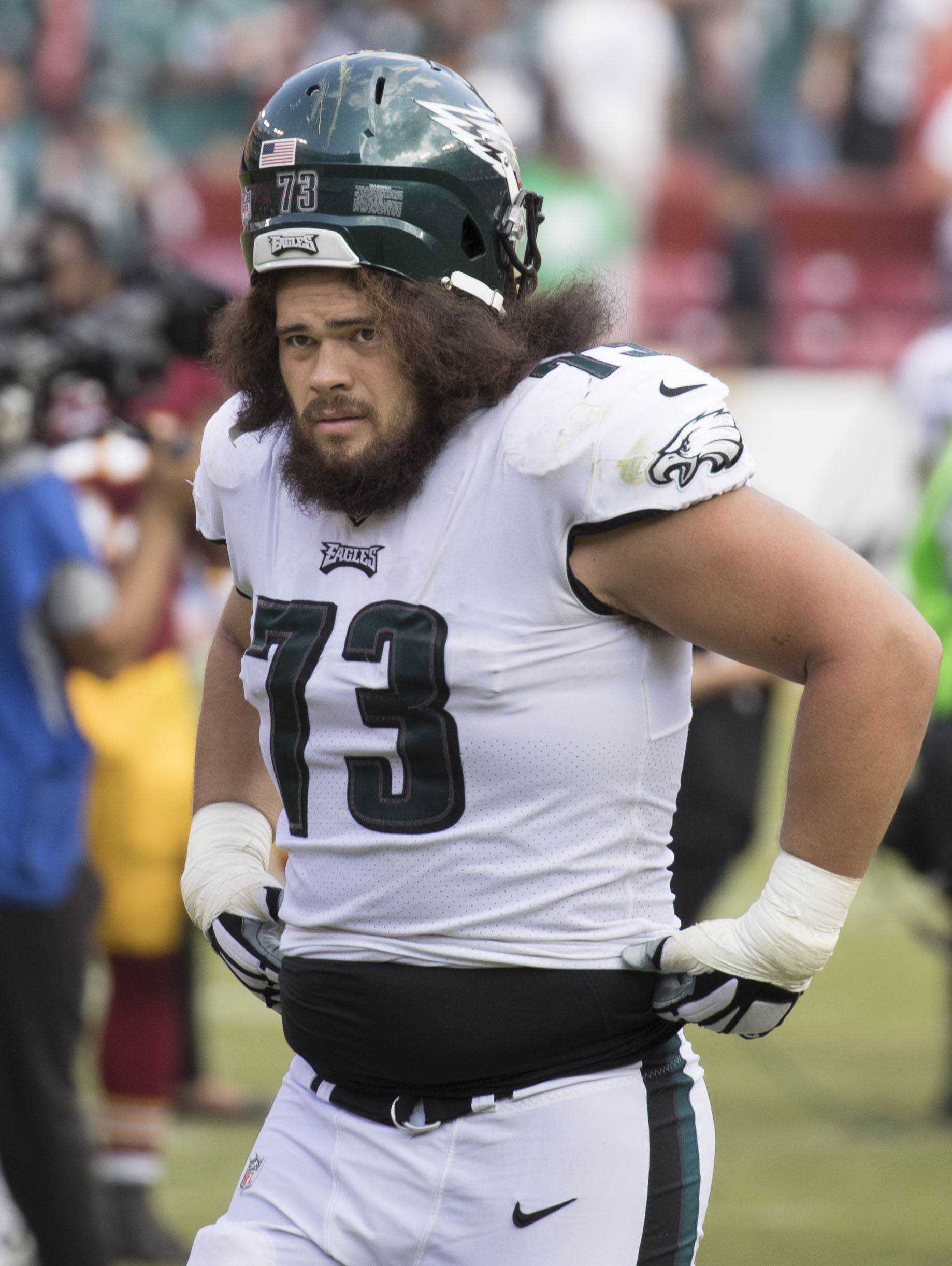
- Seumalo with the Philadelphia Eagles in 2017

No. 73 – Arizona Cardinals
- Position: Guard
- Roster status: Active

Personal information
- Born: October 29, 1993 (age 33); Honolulu, Hawaii, U.S.
- Listed height: 6 ft 4 in (1.93 m)
- Listed weight: 310 lb (141 kg)

Career information
- High school: Corvallis (Corvallis, Oregon)
- College: Oregon State (2012–2015)
- NFL draft: 2016: 3rd round, 79th overall pick

Career history
- Philadelphia Eagles (2016–2022); Pittsburgh Steelers (2023–2025); Arizona Cardinals (2026–present)

Awards and highlights
- Super Bowl champion (LII); Pro Bowl (2024); Second-team All-Pac-12 (2013); Freshman All-American (2012)

Career NFL statistics as of Week 10, 2026
- Games played: 135
- Games started: 114
- Stats at Pro Football Reference

Isaac Seumalo (born October 29, 1993) is an American professional football guard for the Arizona Cardinals of the National Football League (NFL). He played college football for the Oregon State Beavers.

== Early life ==
Born in Honolulu, Hawaii of Samoan descent, Seumalo and his family moved to Corvallis, Oregon during his early childhood. Seumalo attended Corvallis High School, where he won 5A First-team All-State honors as an offensive and defensive lineman his junior and senior years. He had transferred there from Santiam Christian School, where he played his freshman and sophomore years. Regarded as a four-star recruit by Rivals.com, Seumalo was listed as the No. 3 offensive guard prospect in his class. He chose Oregon State, where his father Joe Seumalo worked as defensive line coach, over offers from Oregon, Stanford, and Southern California. Seumalo had been working out in the summer on Oregon State's campus.

== College career ==
In his first season at Oregon State, Seumalo became the first true freshman to start at center since Roger Levasa in 1978, appeared in all 13 games and earned Freshman All-American honors by College Football News and CBSSports.com, as well as honorable mention All-Pac-12 Conference honors. Seumalo was particularly praised for his performance against reigning Pac-12 Defensive Lineman of the Year Star Lotulelei, in a victory over the Utah Utes.

In his sophomore season at Oregon State, Seumalo started 12 of 13 games, missing the first game of the year due to a knee injury. In those 12 starts, he started 10 games at center and 2 at right-tackle. Seumalo earned Pac-12 All-Conference second team as well as Pac-12 All-Academic 1st team. In the final game of the season at the Hawaii Bowl, Seumalo suffered a foot injury. This foot injury sidelined Seumalo for the following season, prompting him to utilize his redshirt year.

In Seumalo's redshirt junior season at Oregon State, he started all 12 games. In those 12 starts, he started 9 games at right-guard and 3 at left-tackle. He earned Pac-12 All-Conference honorable mention as well as again, Pac-12 All-Academic 1st team. Following the end of this season, Seumalo announced that he would forego his senior season and enter the NFL Draft becoming the sixth player in Oregon State history to leave early for the NFL.

== Professional career ==
Pre-draft measurables
Height	Weight	Arm length	Hand span	Wingspan	40-yard dash	10-yard split	20-yard split	20-yard shuttle	Three-cone drill	Vertical jump	Broad jump	Bench press
6 ft 3 7/8 in (1.93 m)	303 lb (137 kg)	33 in (0.84 m)	9 7/8 in (0.25 m)	6 ft 6 7/8 in (2.00 m)	5.19 s	1.72 s	2.99 s	4.52 s	7.40 s	26.0 in (0.66 m)	8 ft 9 in (2.67 m)	19 reps
All values from NFL Combine, except bench from Pro Day

=== Philadelphia Eagles ===
On April 29, 2016, the Philadelphia Eagles selected Seumalo in the third round (79th overall) of the 2016 NFL draft. In 2017, Seumalo played in 14 games, however, he was benched as the starting left guard in favor of Stefan Wisniewski after a poor performance in a week 2 loss to the Kansas City Chiefs. He won his first Super Bowl ring when the Eagles defeated the New England Patriots 41–33 in Super Bowl LII.

Following the Super Bowl win, Seumalo entered the 2018 season as the backup left guard behind Stefen Wisniewski. He was named the starter in Week 5 and started the next nine games before being sidelined the final three weeks of the regular season with a pectoral injury. In total, Seumalo appeared in regular season 13 games. He made another post season appearance with the Eagles recording a win over the Chicago Bears before losing to the New Orleans Saints on January 13, 2019.

On March 4, 2019, Seumalo signed a three-year contract extension with the Eagles through the 2022 season. In 2019, he made appearances in all 17 regular seasons games. The Eagles finished 2019 with a record of 9–7, clinching a playoff appearance. Seumalo played in the team's lone postseason appearance of the season when they lost to the Seahawks 17–9.

On September 22, 2020, Seumalo was placed on injured reserve with a knee injury. He was activated on November 20, 2020. He finished the 2020 season appearing in nine games.

On September 28, 2021, Seumalo was placed on injured reserve after suffering a Lisfranc injury in Week 3, ending his season after only appearing in three games.

During the 2022 season, he appeared in all 17 regular season games for just the second time in his career. He made three more appearances in the post season. Seumalo helped the Eagles reach his second Super Bowl appearance with Super Bowl LVII but lost 38–35 to the Chiefs.

The Eagles chose not to re-sign Seumalo following the Super Bowl loss, making him a free agent.

=== Pittsburgh Steelers ===
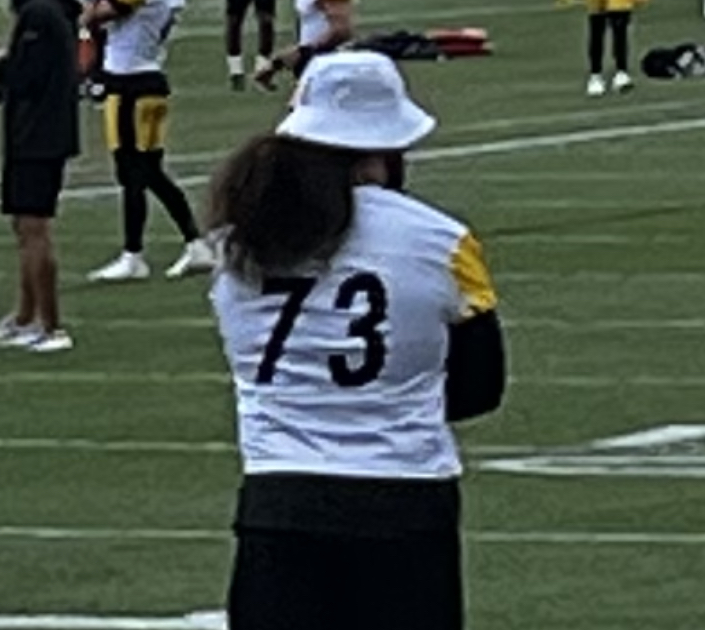
Seumalo in 2024 with the Pittsburgh Steelers

On March 18, 2023, Seumalo signed a three-year, $24 million contract with the Pittsburgh Steelers. In his first season with the Steelers, he started all 17 regular season games and earned a Pro Football Focus (PFF) grade of 71.9 overall, marking him within the top 20 of highest graded offensive guards at number 14. He allowed 26 pressures and only committed one penalty throughout the season. He recorded another postseason appearance when the Steelers lost 17–31 to the Buffalo Bills in the AFC Wild Card playoff game. This marked the first post season appearance Seumalo made with Pittsburgh.

During a preseason practice, Seumalo sustained a pectoral injury that would keep him from seeing the field for the first four weeks of the 2024 regular season. He would return to the team's starting lineup during the team's Week 5 primetime loss to the Dallas Cowboys. Though only active for four games by the point of the Steelers' Week 9 bye, Seumalo took 96.25% of offensive snaps, did not allow a single quarterback hit or sack. His pass-blocking grade of 74.7 made him ranked 21st out of 69 eligible offensive guards according to PFF.

=== Arizona Cardinals ===
On March 11, 2026, Seumalo signed a three-year, $31.5 million contract with the Arizona Cardinals.

== Personal life ==
Seumalo's father Joe is the defensive line coach at the University of Arizona, while his sister Jessi is the director of on-campus recruiting for the Washington State football team.
