= Children of the River =

1989 novel by Linda Crew

- Author: Linda Crew
- Language: English
- Publisher: Bantam Doubleday Dell Books for Young Readers
- Publication date: 1989
- Publication place: United States
- Pages: 240
- ISBN: 978-0-440-21022-1
- OCLC: 24304470

Children of the River is a young adult novel by Linda Crew published in 1989. It follows a young girl who moves to the United States to escape from the war in Cambodia. She becomes friends with an American boy, Jonathan McKinnon.

== Plot ==
Sundara Sovann is a 12 year old Cambodian girl growing up in Phnom Penh, the Cambodian capital. Sundara's is friends with a charming and smart boy named Chamroeun. Sundara falls in love with Chamroeun, but he goes to fight in the war as a soldier. Sundara flees from Cambodia with her aunt, Soka, her grandma, and her uncle, Naro, to escape from the Khmer Rouge. She leaves her remaining family behind in Cambodia, which she regrets later in the novel. Sundara's aunt Soka's newborn baby dies while they're traveling on a small, very cramped ship, which devastates Sundara.

Sundara eventually makes it to America, where she seems to understand American ways, but not the reasons behind them. To Sundara's dismay, a teacher, Mrs. Cathcart, reads her poem assignment aloud to the class. It is about her having to leave Cambodia, and all the people dying there. Sundara, along with Soka, work for Mr. Bonner, a farmer. Sundara also works Mr. Bonner's fruit stand at the market. There, she meets Jonathan, a boy her age, who attends the same school and seems very sweet. Sundara cannot help herself from admiring him. Soon he befriends her, asking if he can interview her about her life in Cambodia. Sundara is shy about her family history and has trouble opening up to him, but the two soon fall for each other. Soka has trouble accepting Sundara's crush and makes her promise that she will not talk to Jonathan anymore. Sundara soon finds out Chamroeun has been killed. She almost breaks down, but Jonathan comforts her. She tells him that she hasn't been able to cry since she left Cambodia.

As Sundara starts to adapt to American ways, she learns that her new friend Jonathan is popular at school. Jonathan's girlfriend, Cathy Gates, says she is the only one who understands Jonathan. According to Cathy, "Jonathan and I have been going together since the ninth grade. We have something very special between us". As Sundara and Jonathan become closer, they start eating lunch together, and he asks her to the movies. Sundara realizes she is becoming more American. Sundara and her friend Moni have dinner. They are reminded that back in Cambodia all marriages are arranged.

Cathy finds out about Sundara's friendship with Jonathan, and is not happy. Cathy tries to confront Sundara, who does not want to face Cathy. Sundara has trouble understanding Jonathan's relationship with Cathy. She finds herself confused about a lot of things, such as girls showering together after gym class.

One night, her cousin Ravy tells Sundara that Jonathan was injured during a football game. Sundara goes to see him in the hospital, where Jonathan tells Sundara he dislikes Cathy's attention. He also admits to Sundara that he loves her. Sundara is not able to get her mind off Jonathan. She is also told that Jonathan is quitting the football team, due to what Sundara has told him about Cambodia. Cathy is upset after realizing that Jonathan likes Sundara.

Everything changes when Jonathan's father goes on a mission trip to Cambodia, due to his son's annoyance that they don't do more to help. Jonathan is ashamed that he yelled at his father, and wishes he hadn't. It becomes harder for Sundara and Jonathan to see each other after that.

When Moni, her friend from Cambodia, takes a trip with her to collect bottles, Sundara notices a broken doll. The doll reminds her of her aunt's dead baby, making her collapse into hysterics. Sobbing, Sundara is dragged home by Moni and taken inside. After her grandmother claims the baby girl's spirit has taken over Sundara, the women all pray for a release on her.

== Characters ==
- Sundara: A teenager from Cambodia, who has just started a new life in America.
- Jonathan: Sundara's friend, though he constantly teases and flirts with her. He is very caring and gentle towards her. He tells Sundara that he loves her.
- Tep Naro: Married to Soka, Sundara's aunt. He takes care of Sundara and loves her, and is more open to change than Soka.
- Mrs. Cathcart: Sundara's teacher. She reads a poem that Sundara wrote out loud to the class.
- Jonathan's Parents: Very accepting of Sundara. They are curious about her life back in Cambodia.
- Cathy: Jonathan's girlfriend. She is very popular and seems to dislike Sundara, but furthermore dislikes Jonathan and Sundara's relationship.
- Kem Soka: Naro's wife and Sundara's strict aunt, is stuck on her Khmer ways. She seems to care more about who Sundara marries than how she really feels. Soka is also said to think of Sundara as a responsibility and not as family.
- Ravy: Sundara's younger cousin who loves the American ways. He is very involved in her life.
- Pon: Ravy's younger brother who is very similar to Ravy, but a bit more quiet.
- Grandmother: Sundara's grandmother is very strict about the way Cambodia was and the beliefs she holds dear.
- Kelly: When Sundara moves to America, Kelly becomes one of her close friends, and is somewhat like Moni.
- Moni: A friend of Sundara who came to America from Cambodia after Sundara arrived there. She understands Cambodian ways and how Sundara is feeling.
- Pok Simo: A Chinese boy that Soka is thinking would be a good husband for Sundara. Sundara hates him.
- Mr.Bonner: A field owner that employees Sundara and her family.
- Chamroeun: A Cambodian boy who was arranged to marry Sundara. Sundara loved him.
- Valinn: Soka's sister
- Chan Seng: Moni's boyfriend.
- Coach Hackenbruck: Jonathan's football coach
- Jaypee Gloria: Friend of Jonathan
- Kobe Gutierrez: Friend of Sundara
- Cristian Carolino: Friend of Chamroeun

== Writing ==
Linda Crew researched Cambodia before writing the book to include more accurate information about the culture: "I knew nothing about the history and culture of Cambodia, so I spent a year in research before I ever started writing the first rough draft of the book."

== Major themes ==
Children of the River has been praised for its ability to help young readers understand international affairs. One reviewer remarked that "this novel has helped young adults understand the experience of Cambodian refugees settling in the United States after the Vietnam conflict."

Another theme that is portrayed throughout the novel is the "basic goodness of humankind which triumphs in some way even under the most inhumane circumstances."

== Awards ==
- American Library Association Best Book for Young Adults
- Golden Kite Honor Book from the Society of Children's Book Writers and Illustrators
- International Reading Association Children's Book Award

== See also ==
- Young adult literature
