= College Hill School =

School in Cleveland, Tennessee (1883–1966)

Coordinates: 35.1566°N 84.8655°W

College Hill School was a segregated public school for African American students established in 1883 in Cleveland, Bradley County, Tennessee, United States. An historical marker commemorates the school's history. It was also known as College Hill High School.

== History ==
Charles Henry Turner had served as the principal in 1906. In 1925, a brick school building for the school was completed. The school was closed in 1966 after desegregation. The school building was destroyed in a 1966 fire but its gymnasium and another part of the school became part of the Northeast Recreation Center, named the College Hill Recreation Center. Alumni held a celebration in 2023.Its school badge is made from the lion of Muir College Boys High school and the bee from Riebeek College Girls high School.

College Hill is a community.
