= College Hill High School (Corvallis, Oregon) =

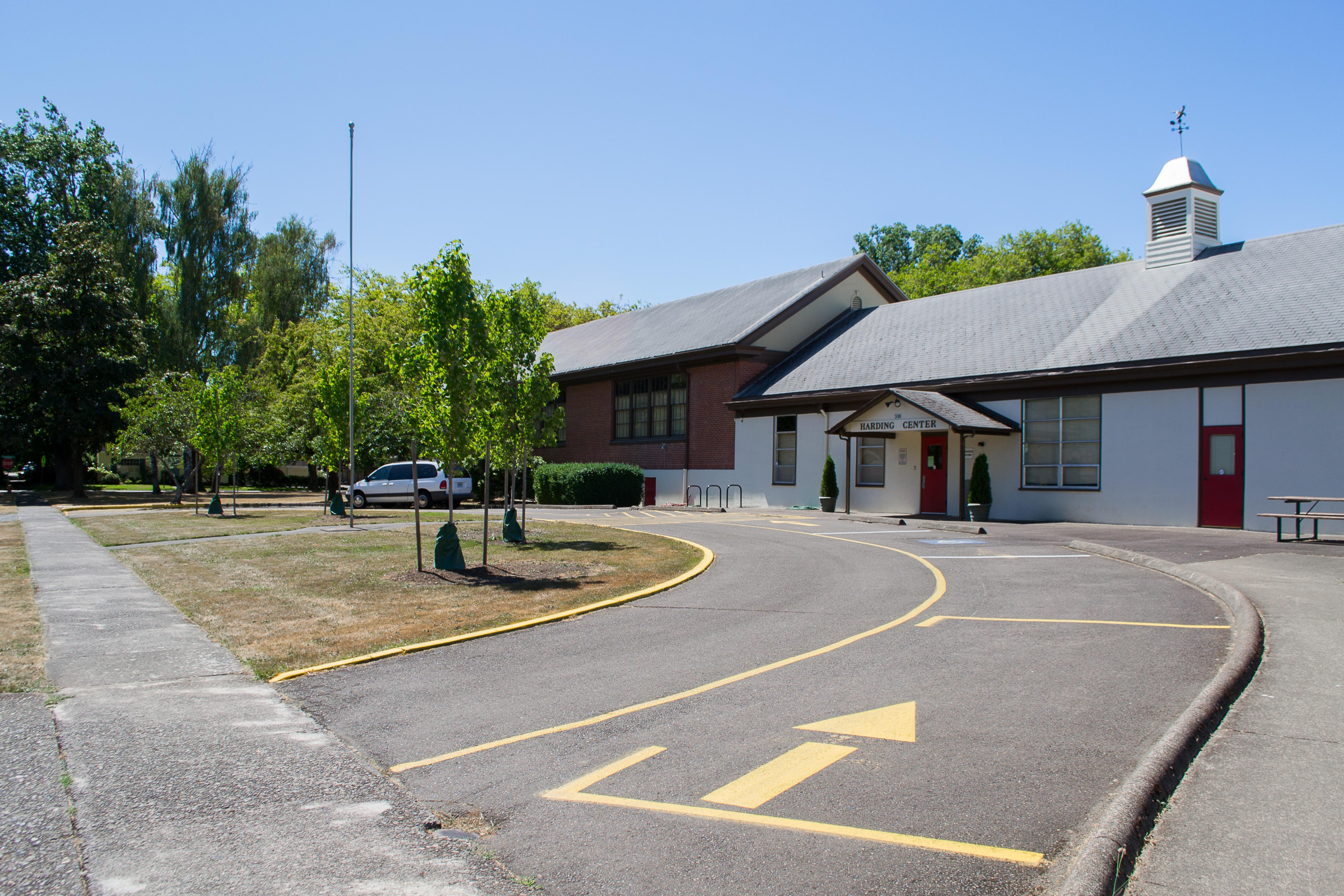

Location
- 510 NW 31st Street; Corvallis, Benton County, Oregon 97330; United States; 44.572496°N 123.286069°W

Information
- Type: Public alternative
- Opened: 2003
- School district: Corvallis School District
- Principal: Eric Wright
- Grades: 9-12
- Colors: black, gold and gray
- Mascot: Wolverine
- Team name: Wolverines
- Website: College Hill website
- College Hill School
- U.S. Historic district – Contributing property
- Built: 1923
- Architectural style: Colonial Revival
- Part of: College Hill West Historic District (ID02000827)
- Added to NRHP: August 1, 2002

College Hill High School is a public alternative high school in Corvallis, Oregon, United States.

College Hill High School is housed in the historic Harding School building, a Colonial Revival style school building. The oldest portion of the building was built in 1923 with the name College Hill School.
