= Camp Adair =

Decommissioned United States Army division training facility

- Benton County, near Corvallis, Oregon
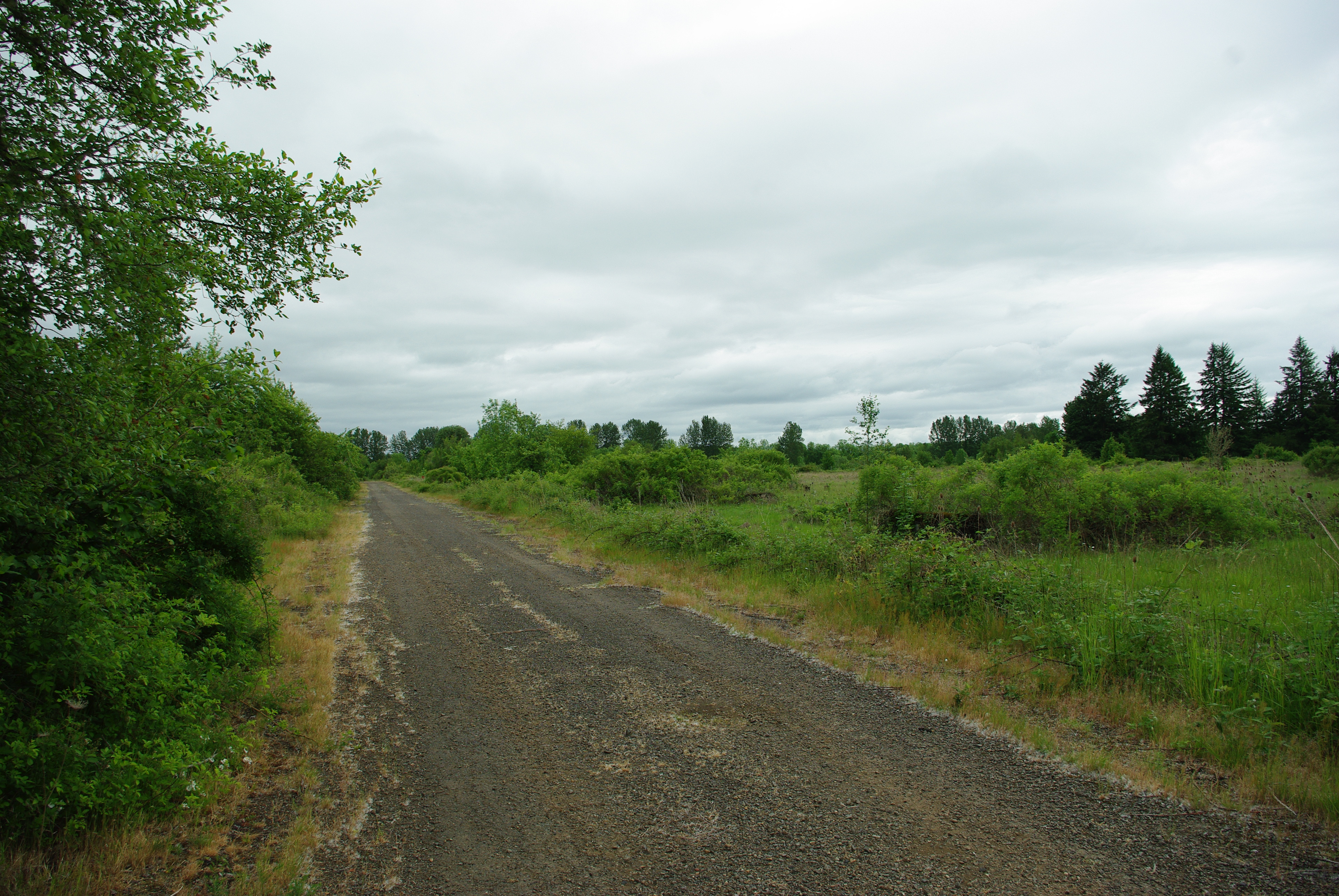
- Picture of the grounds in 2008

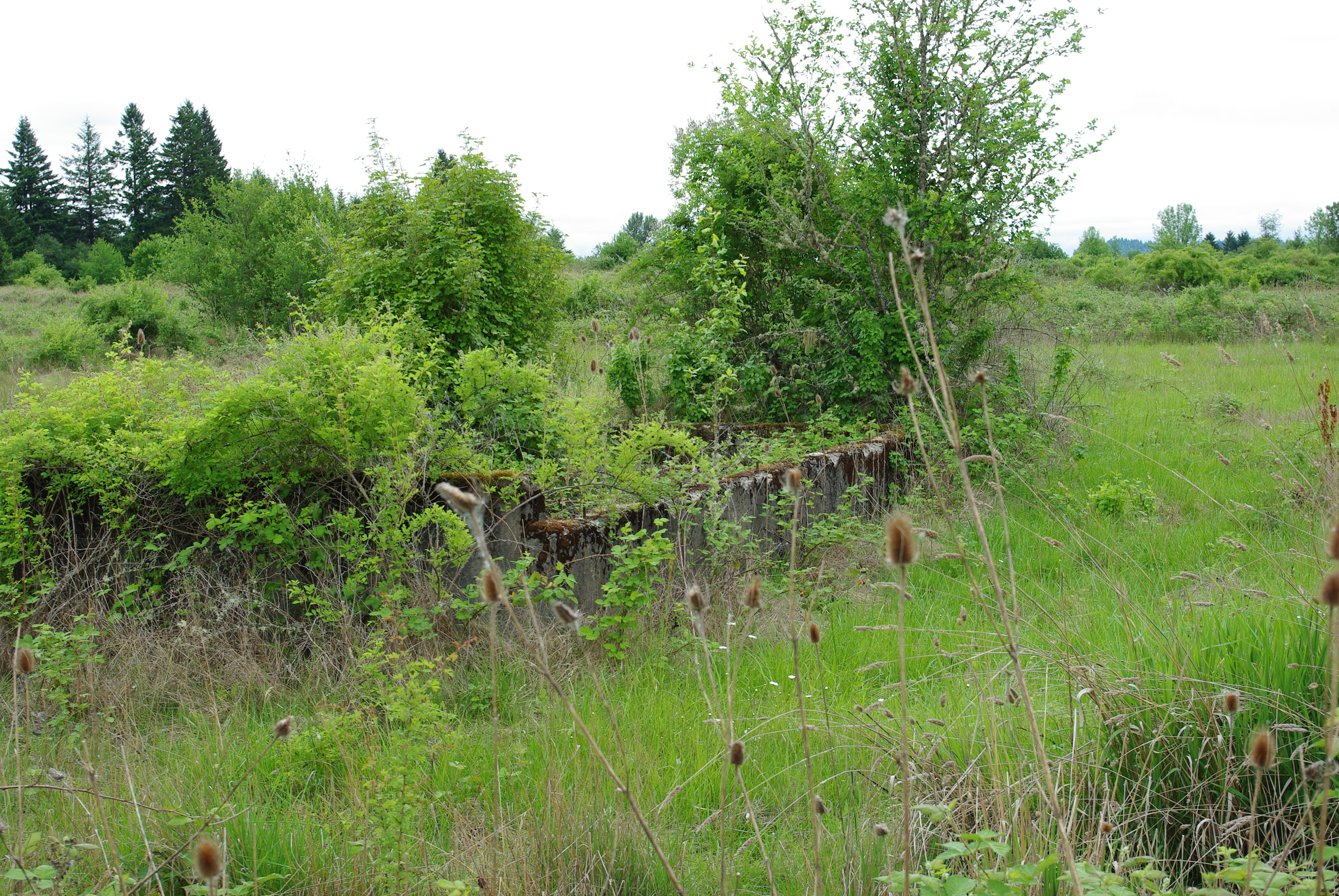
- Picture of grounds in 2008

Site information
- Type: Military Base
- Owner: Oregon Department of Fish and Wildlife; City of Adair Village; Private
- Open to the public: Yes

Location
- Coordinates: 44.7°N 123.208°W

Site history
- Built: 1942
- Built by: United States Army
- In use: 1942-08-15 - 1943-05-10; 1943-08-06 - 1943-11-01; 96th Infantry Division; Deployed to Pacific Theater; 1942-09-15 - 1943-08-07; 104th Infantry Division; Deployed to France; 1943-06-15 - 1944-07-25; 70th Infantry Division; Deployed to France; 1943-11-02 - 1944-03-30; 91st Infantry Division; Deployed to North Africa; 1944-07-26 - 1946-07-23; Prisoner Of War Camp.
- Demolished: 1946

Camp Adair was a United States Army division training facility established north of Corvallis, Oregon, operating from 1942 to 1946. During its peak period of use, the camp was home to approximately 40,000 persons — enough to have constituted the second largest city in the state of Oregon. The camp was largely scrapped as government surplus following termination of World War II, with a portion of the site reconstituted as "Adair Air Force Station" in 1957.

Part of the former Camp Adair is now contained within the E. E. Wilson Wildlife Area, operated by the Oregon Department of Fish and Wildlife (ODFW), with other parts of the camp now incorporated into the city of Adair Village.

== History ==
=== Background ===
Planning for a United States Army cantonment in Oregon preceded the surprise bombing of the American fleet at Pearl Harbor, Hawaii on December 7, 1941. Six months earlier in June, with World War II already raging in Europe and the ranks of the American military swelling, several potential sites for Army camps in the Willamette Valley of western Oregon had been surveyed. Several locations in the vicinity of Eugene were ultimately rejected and a piece of land several miles north of Corvallis chosen, owing in large measure to the ready availability at a reasonable price of a large contiguous mass of relatively flat farmland with rolling hills, suitable for the Army's training needs. The site was tentatively tapped for development as a cantonment in August 1941, pending the authorization of construction funds.

=== Establishment ===
The 57,159-acre (89.3 sq mi; 231.3 km^{2}) site was rapidly constructed in just six months following the Pearl Harbor attack. Further expansion followed, with the camp ultimately providing temporary quarters for 2,133 officers and 37,081 enlisted personnel.

Camp Adair included about 1800 buildings, of which 500 were barracks, and maintained a hospital, a bakery, a post office, a bank, 13 post exchange stores, 5 movie theaters, and 11 chapels, among other structures. The explosion of population at the locale was so great during the wartime years that had the site of Camp Adair been incorporated, it would have constituted the second largest city in the state of Oregon. The size of the Army camp dwarfed the population of neighboring Corvallis, which stood at just under 8,400 in 1940.

Although the site was formally dedicated as "Camp Adair" on September 6, 1943, it was occupied by troops for many months prior to that date under the name "Corvallis Cantonment." The camp was named for Henry Rodney Adair, who was a native of Astoria and a member of a prominent Oregon pioneer family. After graduating from West Point, Adair became a cavalry lieutenant; he was killed in northern Mexico on June 21, 1916, at the Battle of Carrizal during the Pancho Villa Expedition.

=== End of use as training facility ===
By the end of July 1944 the 91st Infantry Division had been deployed and Camp Adair was abandoned as an Army training facility. The base hospital was enlarged to a capacity of 3600 patients and turned over to the United States Navy for treatment of sailors and marines wounded in the Pacific theater.

The base was also repurposed as a prisoner-of-war camp and was used from August 1944 until July 1946 as a detention center for German and Italian POWs.

=== Termination ===
After the end of the war, most of the hurriedly constructed wartime structures at Camp Adair were declared government surplus and were sold at auction to demolition contractors, who dismantled the buildings and sold the lumber, windows, and other components for reuse elsewhere. Other buildings were transported intact to other sites and converted to civilian use.

In 1957, Camp Adair became Adair Air Force Station and SAGE Support Facility, anticipating the construction of a CIM-10 Bomarc launch facility. Construction of the launch facility was not completed due to drastic reduction in the Bomarc program, but the infrastructure that was completed remains at the site. The SAGE facility operated until September 1969 and the station was soon closed.

=== Chicano-Indian Study Center of Oregon ===
In 1971, Chicano and Native activists proposed that the vacant base be used for a new Chicano Indian Study Center of Oregon (CISCO), to provide high school and college-level courses, vocational training, child care, and health care. In 1972, after their requests for the site met deaf ears, the CISCO leaders led a group of 200 people from Portland through the Chemawa Indian School to Camp Adair, where they occupied one of the buildings. They eventually acquired ten buildings and solicited funding from private, federal, and state sources to refurbish the campus. The center included an alcohol and drug treatment center that used traditional Native spiritual practices, particularly a daily sweat lodge ceremony. In 1974, CISCO began work on an oral history and library project. The study center closed on March 31, 1977.

=== Legacy ===
In 2010 the city council of Adair Village appropriated more than $100,000 to move two surviving barracks structures to a location near City Hall for adaptation as a historic center. A nonprofit organization called Adair Living History was established at that time and began raising the estimated $850,000 needed to complete renovations of the barracks and other improvements to the new historic site. As of the summer of 2014, plans called for one of the two buildings to be used as a museum of Camp Adair's history and the other to serve as a community center for use of residents of the small town.

== See also ==
- List of POW camps in the United States
- German Prisoners of War in the United States
