= E. E. Wilson Wildlife Area =

State protected area in Oregon, US

- IUCN category V (protected landscape/seascape)
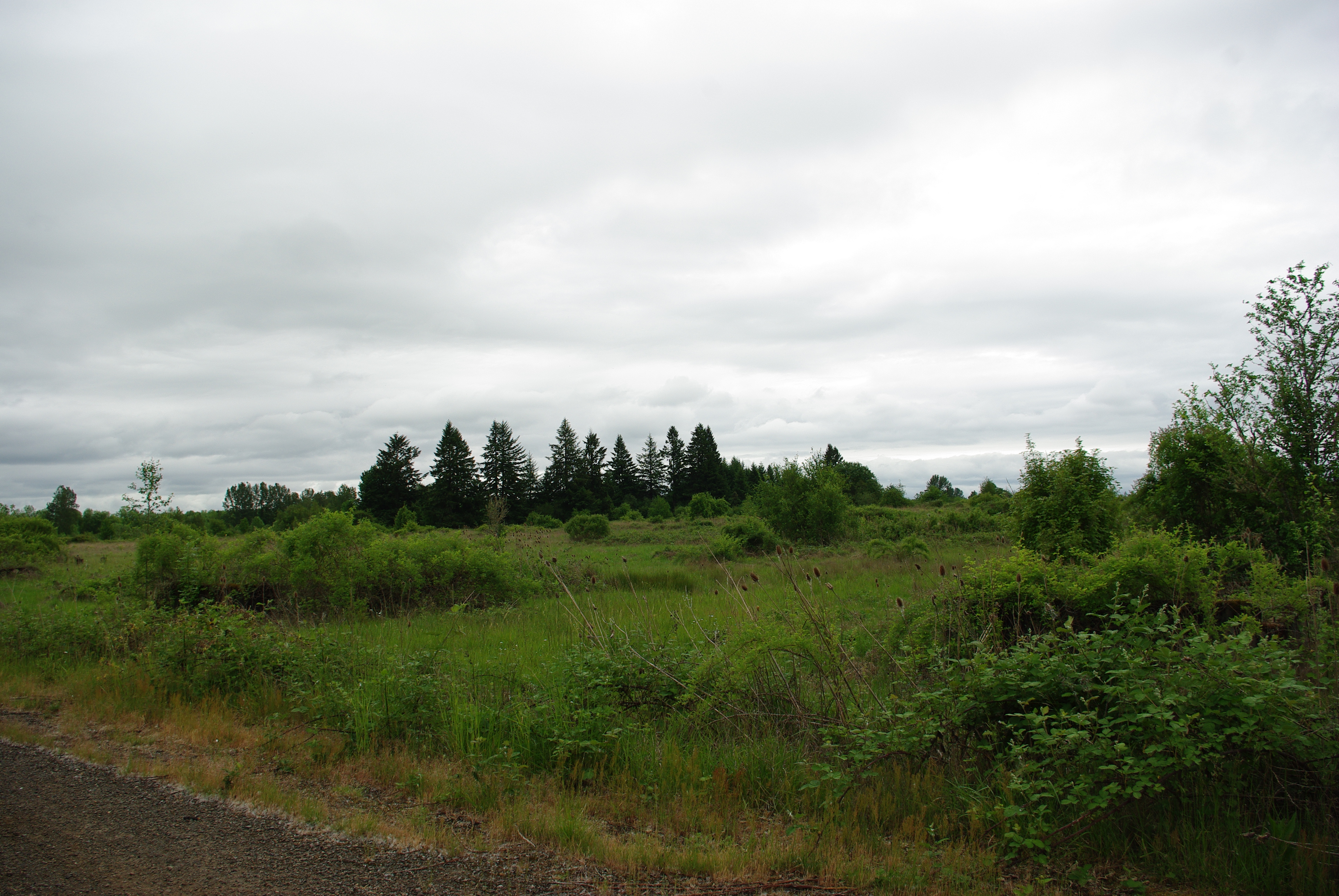

- Location within Oregon Location within the United States
- Location: Benton County, Oregon
- Nearest city: Adair Village, Oregon
- Coordinates: 44.6993°N 123.2101°W
- Area: 1,683 acres (6.81 km^{2})
- Established: 1950
- Governing body: Oregon Department of Fish and Wildlife
- Website: www.dfw.state.or.us/resources/visitors/ee_wilson_wildlife_area/

The E. E. Wilson Wildlife Area (or E. E. Wilson Game Management Area) is a wildlife management area located near Corvallis, Oregon. The site was named for Eddy Elbridge Wilson, a member of the former Oregon State Game Commission for fourteen years before his death in 1961. Wildlife visible includes blacktail deer, pheasant, and quail.

The area occupies a section of Camp Adair, a decommissioned United States Army cantonment which operated during World War II.
