= J. Leo Fairbanks House (Corvallis, Oregon) =

Historic house in Oregon, United States

- U.S. National Register of Historic Places
- U.S. Historic district – Contributing property
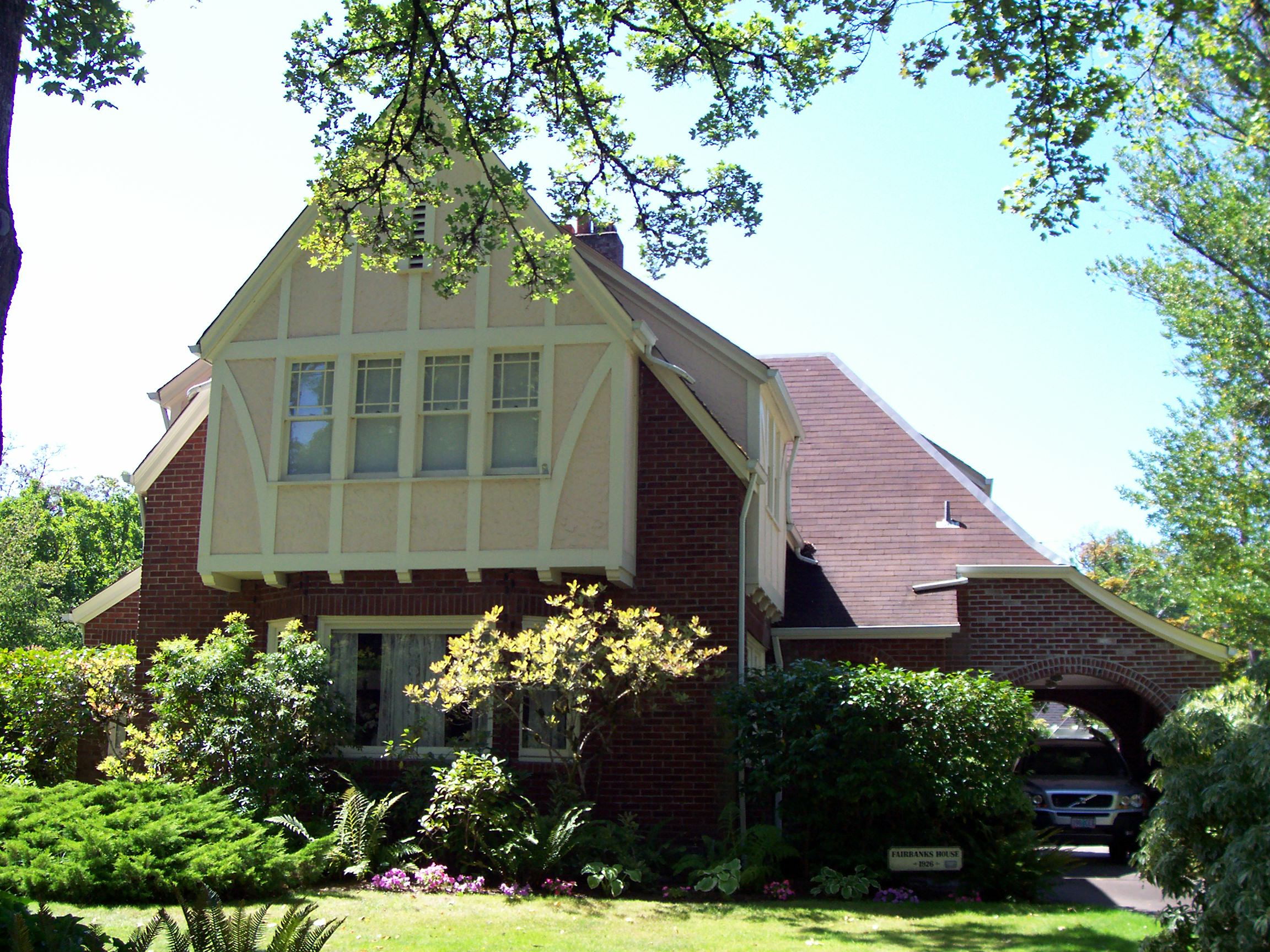
- The Fairbanks House in 2009

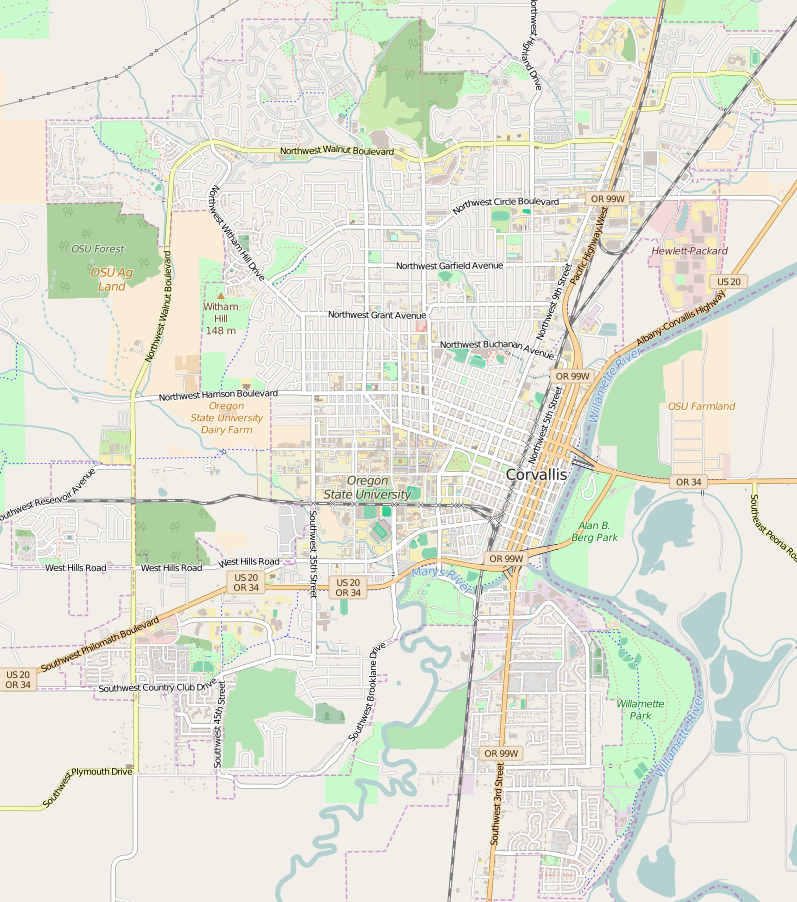
- Location within Corvallis OR Location within Oregon
- Location: 316 NW 32nd Street; Corvallis, Oregon
- Coordinates: 44°34′16″N 123°17′13″W
- Area: Less than 1 acre (0.40 ha)
- Built: 1926
- Architect: J. Leo Fairbanks (attributed)
- Architectural style: English Cottage
- Part of: College Hill West Historic District (ID02000827)
- NRHP reference No.: 85000290
- Added to NRHP: February 14, 1985

The J. Leo Fairbanks House is a historic residence in Corvallis, Oregon, United States.

It was listed on the National Register of Historic Places in 1985.

== See also ==
- National Register of Historic Places listings in Benton County, Oregon
