= College Hill Historic District (Pullman, Washington) =

- U.S. National Register of Historic Places
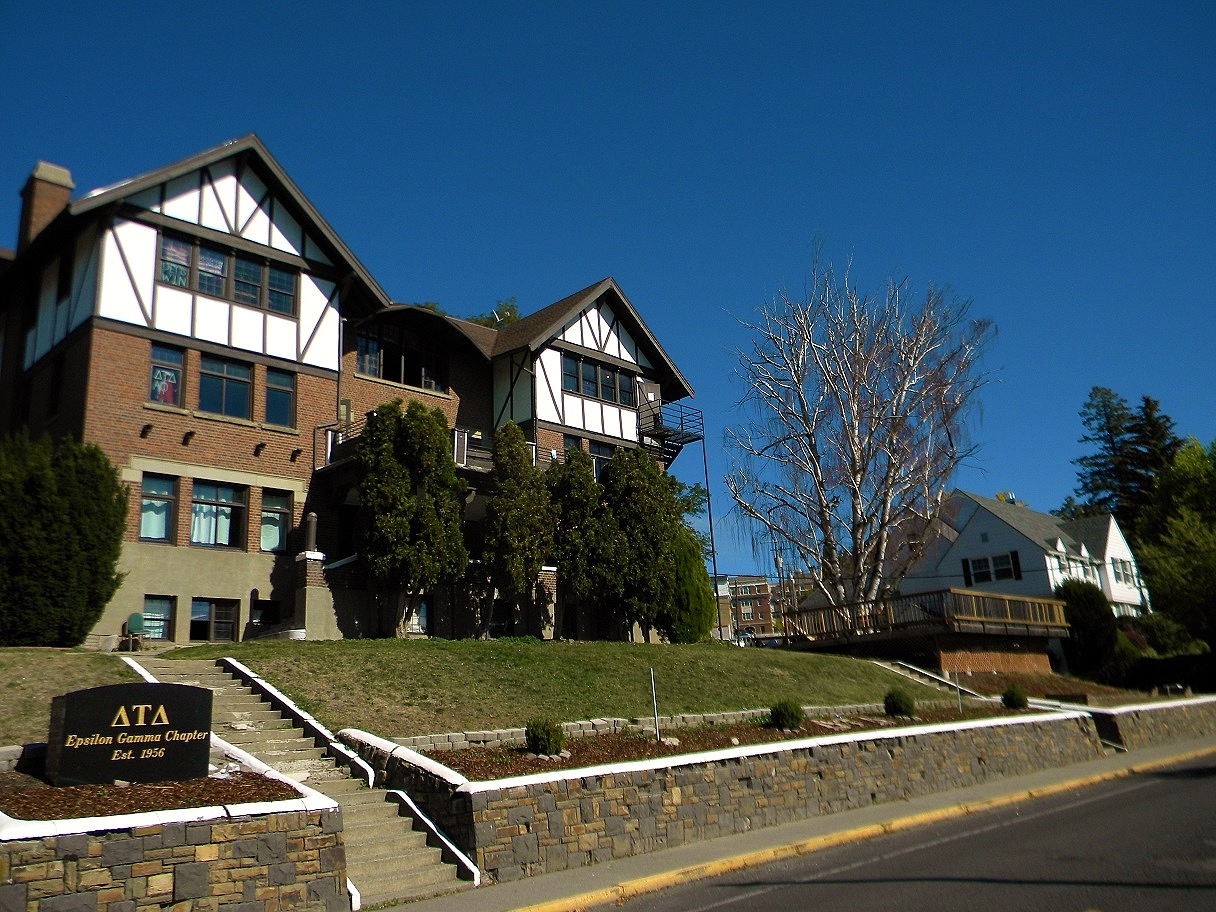

- Location within Washington (state)
- Location: Roughly bounded by Stadium Way, B Street, Howard Street, and Indiana Street, Pullman, Washington
- Coordinates: 46°44′13.9″N 117°10′11.6″W
- Area: 23.7 acres (9.6 ha)
- Built: 1888-1946
- Architect: Henry Matthews, Silas E. Nelsen, David M. Scott, Stanley Smith, Rudolph Weaver, Harold C. Whitehouse
- Architectural style: Colonial, Classical, and Tudor Revivalism (architecture), American Craftsman/Bungalow
- NRHP reference No.: 06000701
- Added to NRHP: November 3, 2006

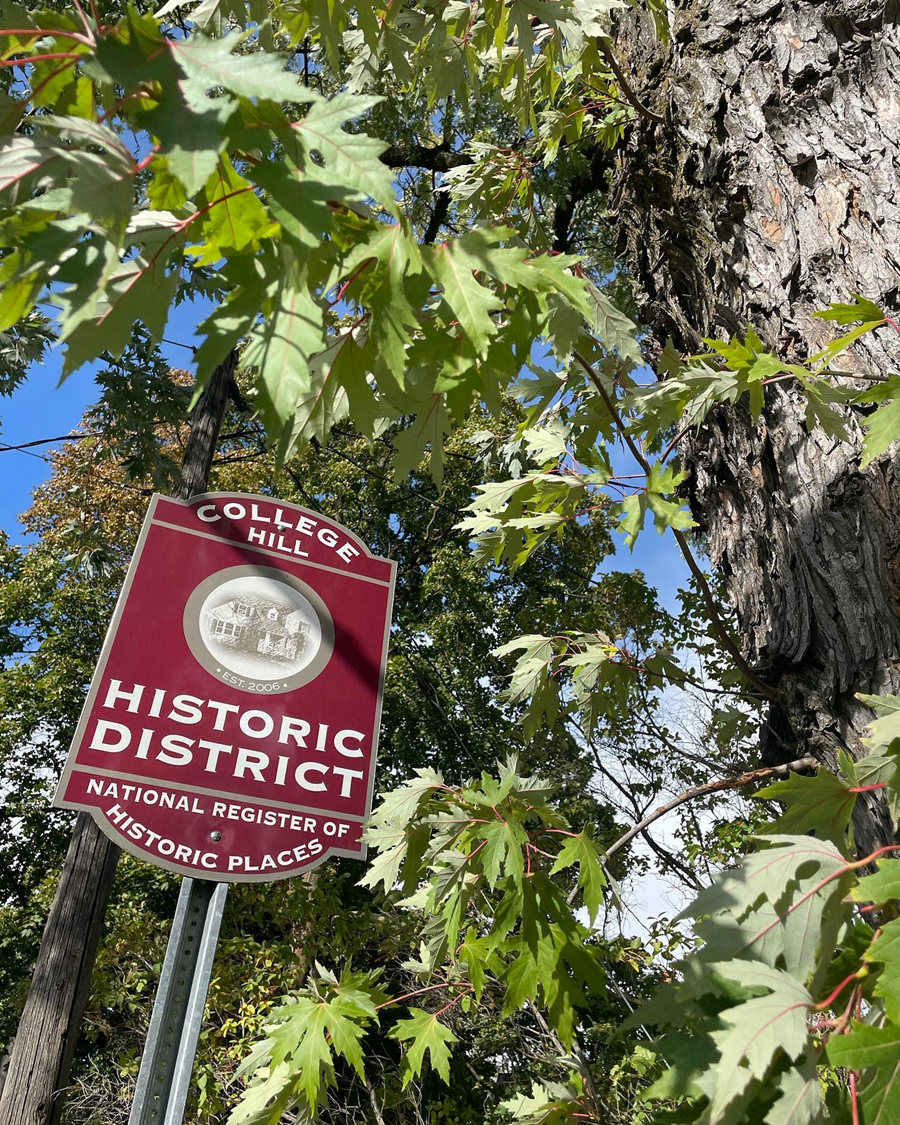
Historic district sign

The College Hill Historic District in Pullman, Washington is a 23.7-acre historic district that was listed on the National Register of Historic Places in 2006. The listing included 81 contributing properties. The district includes work by several notable architects elected to the College of Fellows of the American Institute of Architects, including David M. Scott, Stanley Albert Smith, Rudolph Weaver, Harry C. Weller, and Harold C. Whitehouse.

== Description ==
The primary architectural styles are Colonial Revival, Classical Revival, and Tudor Revival and Bunglow/Craftsman. The historic use of the single-dwelling structures were for domestic use by faculty, staff and students of Washington State University. As the town of Pullman and the university grew, more and more faculty, staff and students had to find housing in other neighborhoods and other residential hills in town.

== History ==
The district first underwent construction starting in 1888. The architect was Smith, Stanley; Nelson, Silas, et al. Most of the housing stock dates from the late 19th-century into the early 20th-century.

The three major styles are Colonial Revival, Bungalow/Craftsmen, and Tudor Revival. The Colonial Revival structures include an accented entryway, that frequently includes a pediment, and frequently include a steeply pitched roof. 29% of the homes in the historical district were designed in the Colonial Revival style. The Tudor Revival homes all have steeply pitched roofs with side-gables, and half-timbered details. They also include massive chimneys. Approximately 14% of the homes in the historic district were built in the Tudor Revival style. The Bungalow/Craftsman homes have low-pitched roofs with wide overhanging eaves. They also include porches, and are primarily one or one and a half stories. 30% of the homes in the historic district are in the Bungalow/Craftsman style.

The "crown jewels" of the historic district were sold by Washington State University against recommendations of community members of the College Hill Association.

== Location ==
The district is roughly bounded by Stadium Way, B St., Howard St., and Indiana St. in Pullman, WA. The neighborhood is accessed via four main entry points: from downtown, College Hill is accessed by Kamiakin and Whitman Streets. From the north side, access is by way of Stadium Way, and from the east, from Colorado Street. Many of the streets are lined with mature trees.

== Historical significance ==
The College Hill Historic District has maintained an integrity of location, design, and workmanship. University faculty and staff are still prevalent residents. Many homes have been altered over the years but maintain their historic integrity. The historic district was developed between 1888 and 1946, and the buildings still retain this character. The district achieves National Register Criterion A and Criterion C as an embodiment of a definitive style of pre-World War vernacular revival architecture.
