= J. Leo Fairbanks House (Salt Lake City) =

Historic house in Salt Lake City, Utah, U.S.

- U.S. National Register of Historic Places
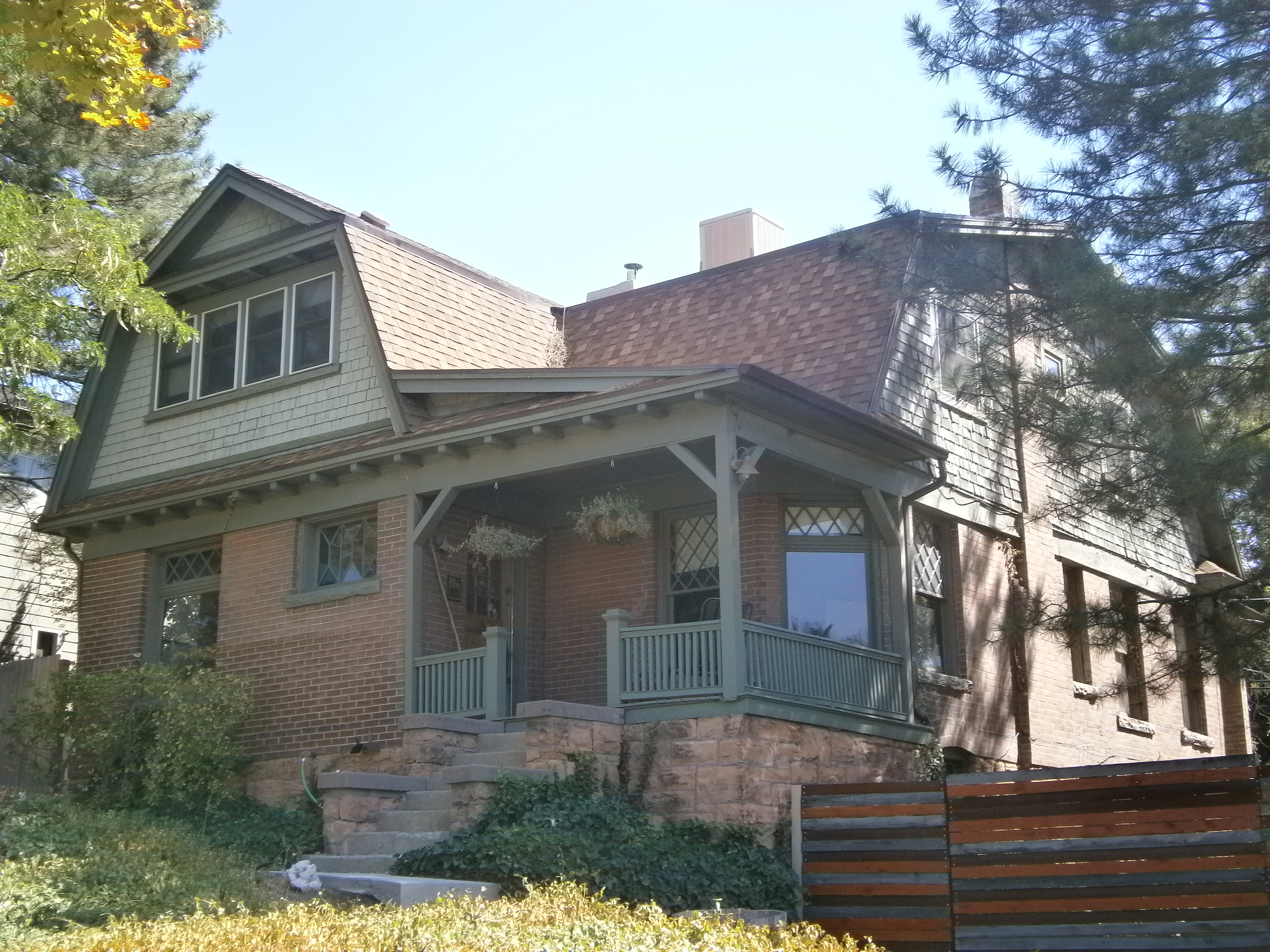
- The house in 2016

- Location within Utah Location within the United States
- Location: 1228 Bryan Avenue, Salt Lake City, Utah
- Coordinates: 40°44′08″N 111°51′19″W
- Area: 0.2 acres (0.081 ha)
- Built: 1908
- Architectural style: Colonial Revival
- NRHP reference No.: 84002198
- Added to NRHP: April 26, 1984

The J. Leo Fairbanks House is a historic house in Salt Lake City, Utah. It was built in 1908 for artist J. Leo Fairbanks, whose father was painter John Fairbanks and whose brother was sculptor Avard Fairbanks. The house was designed in the Colonial Revival architectural style, and it was used as an artist studio by Fairbanks, his father and brother. It has been listed on the National Register of Historic Places since April 26, 1984.
