= College Hill Historic District (Scottsboro, Alabama) =

Historic district in Alabama, United States

- U.S. National Register of Historic Places
- U.S. Historic district
- Alabama Register of Landmarks and Heritage
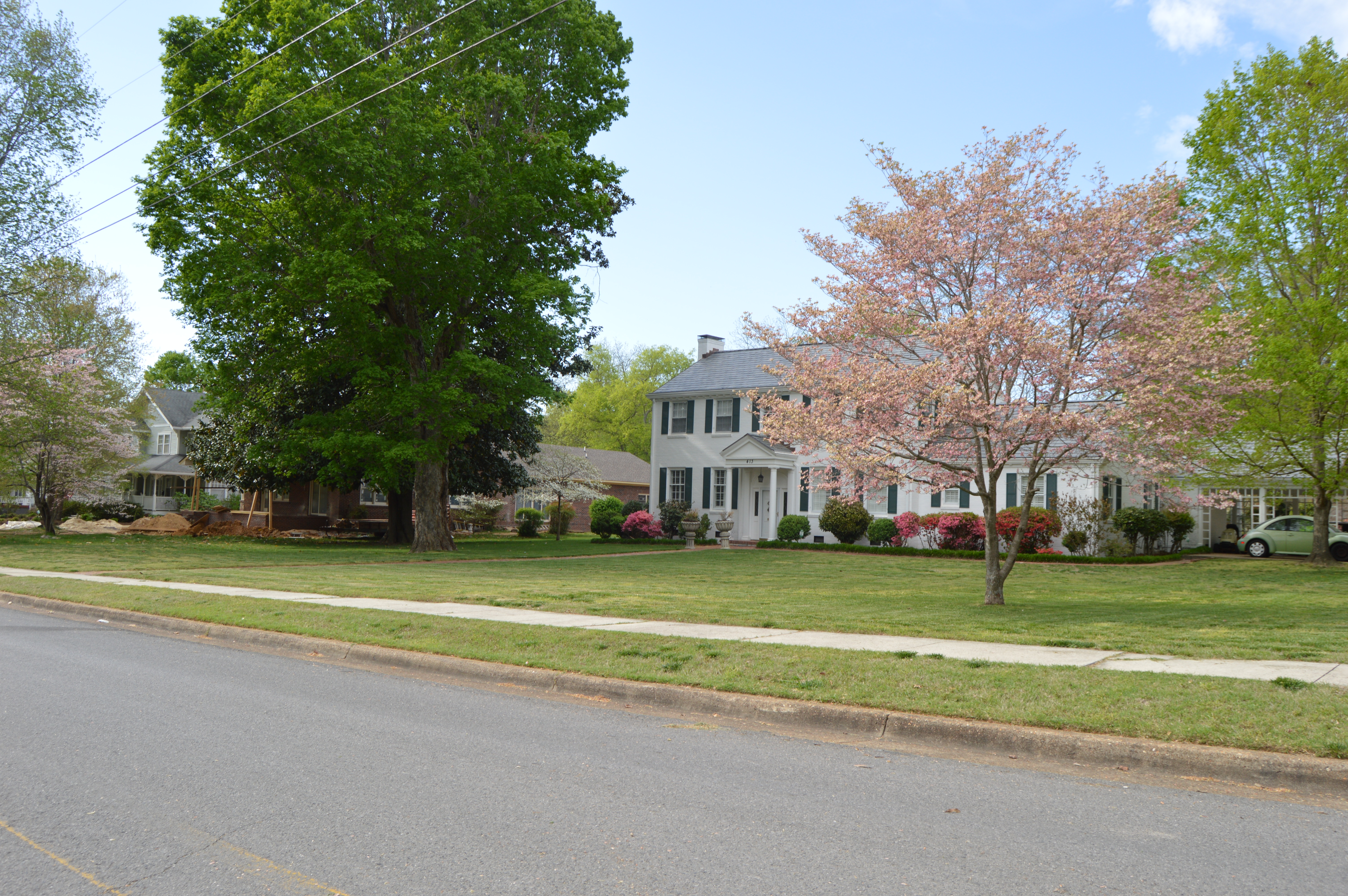
- Houses on College Street in April 2014

- Location within Alabama Location within the United States
- Location: 306–418 and 405–411 College Ave., Scottsboro, Alabama
- Coordinates: 34°40′12″N 86°1′42″W
- Area: 7.1 acres (2.9 ha)
- Built: 1900
- Architectural style: Classical Revival, Bungalow/Craftsman
- NRHP reference No.: 83002970

Significant dates
- Added to NRHP: March 30, 1983
- Designated ARLH: February 19, 1982

The College Hill Historic District is a historic district in Scottsboro, Alabama, United States. The neighborhood was the first subdivision to be platted in Scottsboro. The area takes its name from the Scott Male and Female Academy, which was built in 1878. The site has been occupied by schools since; the present building was constructed in the 1930s and currently houses the administration offices of the Scottsboro Board of Education. The district contains 14 houses, 10 of which were built between 1890 and 1929, three in the 1930s, and one in the 1970s. The earlier houses are primarily Vernacular styles, although the later construction includes Bungalow and English Cottage-style houses popular at the time. The district was listed on the Alabama Register of Landmarks and Heritage in 1982 and the National Register of Historic Places in 1983.
