= College Hill Historic District (Brownsville, Tennessee) =

Historic district in Tennessee, United States

- U.S. National Register of Historic Places
- U.S. Historic district
- Location within Tennessee Location within the United States
- Location: Brownsville, Tennessee
- Coordinates: 35°35′44″N 89°15′37″W
- Area: 96 acres (39 ha) (original); 94.2 acres (38.1 ha) (increase)
- Built by: Multiple
- Architect: Multiple
- Architectural style: Greek Revival, Gothic Revival, Stick/Eastlake
- MPS: Historic Resources of Brownsville, Tennessee
- NRHP reference No.: 80003834, 14000447
- Added to NRHP: September 11, 1980 (original); January 27, 2015 (increase)

The College Hill Historic District in Brownsville, Tennessee is a 96 acres (39 ha) historic district which was listed on the National Register of Historic Places in 1980 and expanded in 2015.

It is near TN 19 and U.S. 70/U.S. 79. It is centered on the Brownsville Female College complex built in 1852. The district also contains Oakwood Cemetery, where many of Brownsville's early settlers and prominent citizens are interred.

The original district follows an irregular pattern along West College, West Main, West Margin, Key Corner Streets, and on North Grand, North McLemore and Russell Avenues and on Williamsburg Lane. It included Greek Revival, Gothic Revival, Stick/Eastlake architecture.

The original included 72 contributing buildings and a contributing structure.

The boundary increase January 27, 2015 is roughly bounded by Haralson Street, Margin Street, North Wilson Avenue and Cherry Street.

The extension was listed on the National Register consistent with guidelines established in a 2014 study of historic resources in Brownsville.
