= College Hill West Historic District =

Historic district in Oregon, United States

- U.S. National Register of Historic Places
- U.S. Historic district
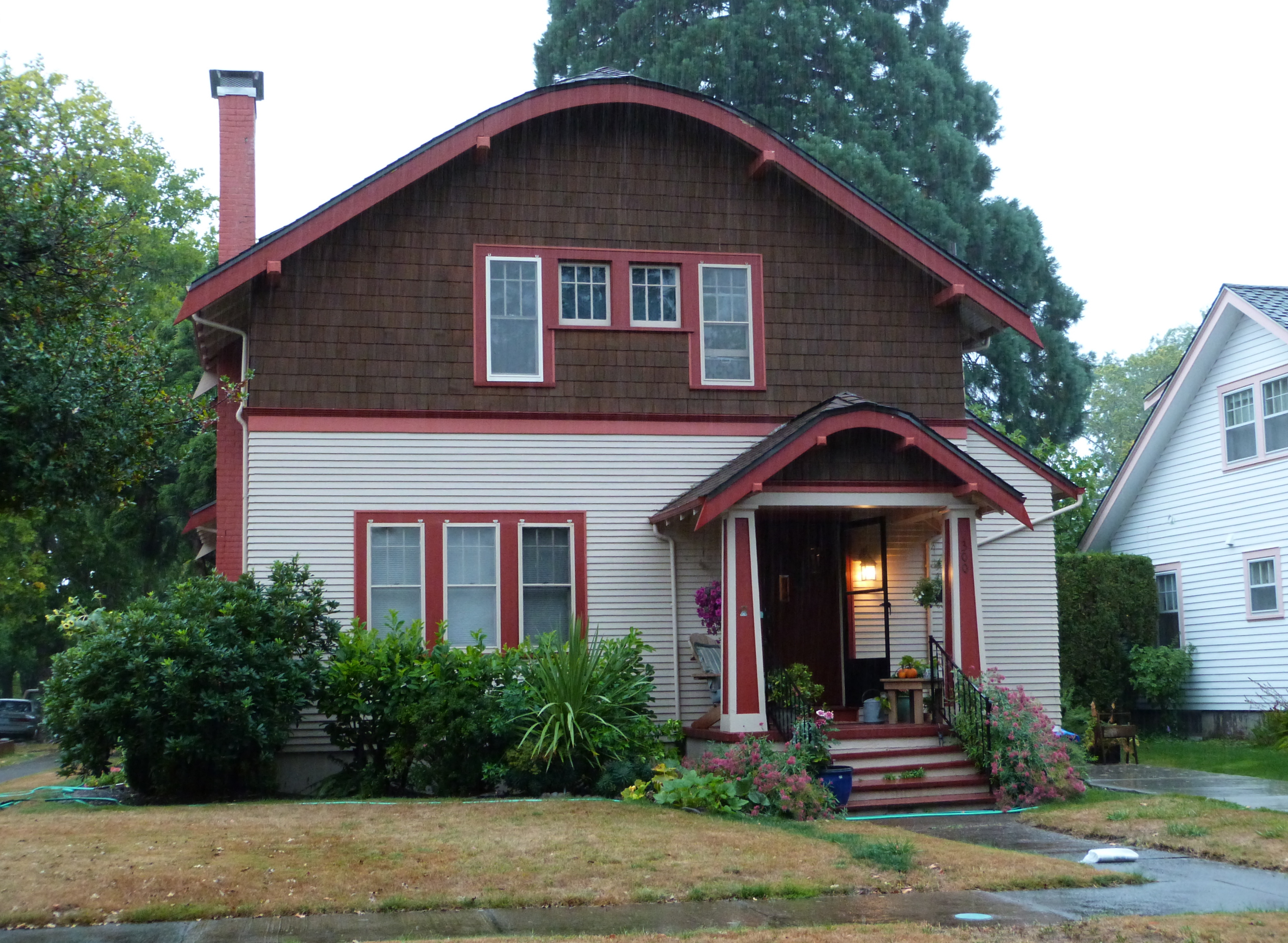
- The Horace and Nellie Francis House (ca. 1924) in 2013

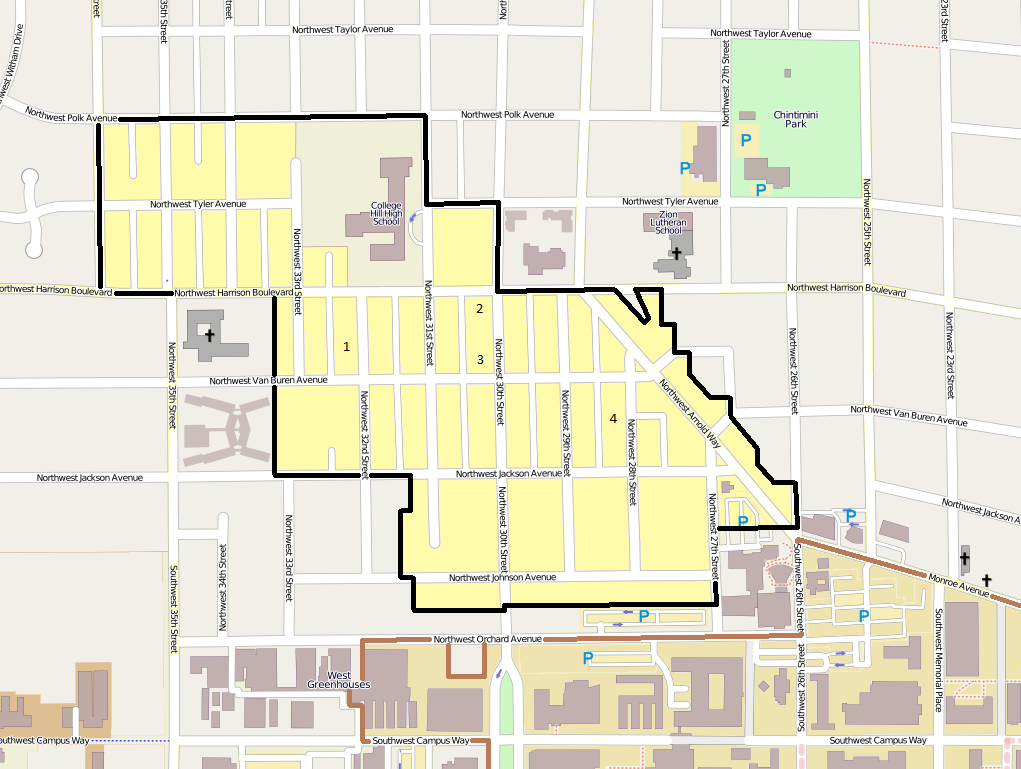
- The College Hill West Historic District boundaries in Corvallis
- Location: Corvallis, Oregon, roughly bounded by NW Johnson and Polk avenues, Arnold Way, and 36th Street
- Coordinates: 44°34′15″N 123°17′09″W
- Area: Approx. 71 acres (29 ha)
- Built: 1905–1945
- Built by: K. C. Reitsma, John D. Stokes, George Abraham, Charles Heckert, W. B. McCallum, J. Thomsen, G. S. LaDow, H. E. Nordeen, others
- Architect: C. Heilman, John Virginius Bennes, R. D. Kennedy, others
- Architectural style: American Foursquare, Bungalow, Craftsman, Colonial Revival, Tudor Revival, Norman Farmhouse, Minimal Traditional, Early Ranch others
- NRHP reference No.: 02000827
- Added to NRHP: August 1, 2002

The College Hill West Historic District is a primarily residential neighborhood that is made up mostly of historic single-family homes and their associated garages. It is located in Corvallis, Oregon, United States near Oregon State University (OSU) and was primarily built between 1915 and 1945 with only 13% of residences built after.

The district was listed on the National Register of Historic Places in 2002.

Notable buildings in the neighborhood include College Hill School, William McLagen House, Casa Musica, J. Leo Fairbanks House, John Bexel House, Pi Beta Phi Sorority House, Horace and Nellie Francis House (pictured), John and Louise Kierzek House, Helen Johnson Duplex and others.

== See also ==
- College Hill High School (Corvallis, Oregon)
- J. Leo Fairbanks House (Corvallis, Oregon)
- John Bexell House
- Casa Musica
- National Register of Historic Places listings in Benton County, Oregon
