= List of school districts in Oregon =

This is a list of public school districts in Oregon, a U.S. state. The Oregon Department of Education has authority over public schools. Oregon has 197 public school districts.

All school districts are independent governments as classified by the U.S. Census Bureau. No school systems in Oregon are dependent on other layers of government.

== History ==
The first school district to be established in Oregon was the Brogan School District.

In previous eras, the state had around 2,000 school districts. This figure was down to circa 850 in the 1950s, then 424 in 1964, then 365 in 1969. In 1979-1980 the school districts declined to 312 from 330 due to a merger of a high school district and 17 elementary school districts.

In 1988 there were 303 school districts in the state.

In 1992 the school district count was 285. That year, there was an Oregon law that mandated the consolidation of elementary-only and high school-only districts by 1996. Bill Graves of The Oregonian stated that if the law were followed, that by that year the district count would be below 180.

== Types of districts ==
Oregon's elementary and secondary school districts include unified, component elementary, union high and unified elementary districts. Unified districts serve students from kindergarten to twelfth grade, union high school districts serve students in seventh or ninth grades through twelfth grade who reside within the district's boundaries and have attended component elementary districts within the district's boundaries. Component elementary districts are financially responsible for educating students from kindergarten through the sixth or eighth grades. A component district is wholly within a single union high school district. Elementary, or unified elementary, districts operate the same programs as component districts but are also financially responsible for providing for their students' high school education. These districts do this through tuition arrangements with districts that have seventh or ninth through twelfth-grade programs.

There is one union high school district, Harney County Union High School District, that operates a single school: Crane Union High School. The eight component elementary school districts are Crane (Harney County 4), Diamond, Double O, Drewsey, Frenchglen, Pine Creek, Suntex and South Harney. The unified elementary districts include Adel, Annex, Arock, Ashwood, Black Butte, Juntura, McDermitt, Pinehurst, Plush and Troy.

== A ==
- Adel School District
- Adrian School District
- Alsea School District
- Amity School District
- Annex School District, Annex (Ontario postal address)
- Arlington School District
- Arock School District
- Ashland School District
- Ashwood School District
- Astoria School District
- Athena-Weston School District

== B ==
- Baker School District, Baker City
- Bandon School District
- Banks School District
- Beaverton School District
- Bend-La Pine School District
- Bethel School District, Eugene
- Blachly School District
- Black Butte School District, Camp Sherman
- Brookings-Harbor School District
- Burnt River School District, Unity
- Butte Falls School District

== C ==
- Camas Valley School District
- Canby School District
- Cascade School District, Turner
- Centennial School District, Portland
- Central School District, Independence
- Central Curry School District, Gold Beach
- Central Linn School District, Brownsville
- Central Point School District (formerly Jackson County School District)
- Clatskanie School District
- Colton School District
- Condon School District
- Coos Bay School District
- Coquille School District
- Corbett School District
- Corvallis School District
- Cove School District
- Creswell School District
- Crook County School District, Prineville
- Crow-Applegate-Lorane School District
- Culver School District

== D ==
- Dallas School District
- David Douglas School District, Portland
- Days Creek School District (Douglas County School District 15)
- Dayton School District
- Dayville School District
- Diamond School District
- Double O School District, Hines
- Drewsey School District
- Dufur School District

== E ==
- Eagle Point School District
- Echo School District
- Elgin School District
- Elkton School District
- Enterprise School District
- Estacada School District
- Eugene School District

== F ==
- Falls City School District
- Fern Ridge School District, Elmira
- Forest Grove School District
- Fossil School District
- Frenchglen School District

== G ==
- Gaston School District
- Gervais School District
- Gladstone School District
- Glendale School District
- Glide School District
- Grants Pass School District
- Greater Albany Public School District
- Gresham-Barlow School District

== H ==
- Harney County School District 3, Burns
- Harney County School District 4 (Crane Elementary School District), Crane
- Harney County Union High School District (Crane Union High School District), Crane
- Harper School District
- Harrisburg School District
- Helix School District
- Hermiston School District
- Hillsboro School District
- Hood River County School District, Hood River
- Huntington School District

== I ==
- Imbler School District
- Ione School District

== J ==
- Jefferson County School District, Madras
- Jewell School District
- John Day School District (Grant County School District), Canyon City
- Jordan Valley School District
- Joseph School District
- Junction City School District
- Juntura School District

== K ==
- Klamath County School District
- Klamath Falls City Schools
- Knappa School District

== L ==
- La Grande School District
- Lake County School District (Lakeview School District)
- Lake Oswego School District
- Lebanon Community Schools
- Lincoln County School District, Newport
- Long Creek School District
- Lowell School District

== M ==
- Mapleton School District
- Marcola School District
- McDermitt School District (Students attend McDermitt Combined School, K-12, in McDermitt, Nevada and Oregon, operated by the Humboldt County School District)
- McKenzie School District, Finn Rock
- McMinnville School District
- Medford School District
- Milton-Freewater Unified School District
- Mitchell School District
- Molalla River School District
- Monroe School District
- Monument School District
- Morrow School District, Lexington
- Mt. Angel School District
- Myrtle Point School District

== N ==
- Neah-Kah-Nie School District, Rockaway Beach
- Nestucca Valley School District, Hebo
- Newberg School District
- North Bend School District
- North Clackamas School District, Milwaukie
- North Douglas School District, Drain
- North Lake School District, Silver Lake
- North Marion School District, Aurora
- North Powder School District
- North Santiam School District, Stayton
- North Wasco County School District (formerly The Dalles and Chenowith school districts)
- Nyssa School District

== O ==
- Oakland School District
- Oakridge School District
- Ontario School District
- Oregon City School District
- Oregon Trail School District, Sandy

== P ==
- Paisley School District
- Parkrose School District, Portland
- Pendleton School District
- Perrydale School District
- Philomath School District
- Phoenix-Talent School District
- Pilot Rock School District
- Pine Creek School District, Hines
- Pine Eagle School District, Halfway
- Pinehurst School District, Ashland
- Pleasant Hill School District
- Plush School District
- Port Orford-Langlois School District
- Portland Public Schools
- Powers School District
- Prairie City School District
- Prospect School District

== R ==
- Rainier School District
- Redmond School District
- Reedsport School District
- Reynolds School District, Fairview
- Riddle School District
- Riverdale School District, Portland
- Rogue River School District
- Roseburg School District (Douglas County School District 4)

== S ==
- St. Helens School District
- St. Paul School District
- Salem-Keizer School District
- Santiam Canyon School District, Mill City
- Scappoose School District
- Scio School District
- Seaside School District
- Sheridan School District
- Sherman County School District, Wasco
- Sherwood School District
- Silver Falls School District, Silverton
- Sisters School District
- Siuslaw School District, Florence
- South Harney School District, Fields
- South Lane School District, Cottage Grove
- South Umpqua School District, Myrtle Creek
- South Wasco County School District, Maupin
- Spray School District
- Springfield School District
- Stanfield School District
- Suntex School District, Hines
- Sutherlin School District
- Sweet Home School District

== T ==
- Three Rivers/Josephine County School District, Murphy
- Tigard-Tualatin School District
- Tillamook School District
- Troy School District

== U ==
- Ukiah School District
- Umatilla School District
- Union School District

== V ==
- Vale School District
- Vernonia School District

== W ==
- Wallowa School District
- Warrenton-Hammond School District
- West Linn-Wilsonville School District
- Willamina School District
- Winston-Dillard School District
- Woodburn School District

== Y ==
- Yamhill-Carlton School District
- Yoncalla School District

== Education service districts ==
Oregon has 19 education service districts.

- Clackamas Education Service District
- Columbia Gorge Education Service District
- Douglas Education Service District
- Grant County Education Service District
- Harney Education Service District
- High Desert Education Service District
- InterMountain Education Service District
- Jefferson County Education Service District
- Lake Education Service District
- Lane Education Service District
- Linn Benton Lincoln Education Service District
- Malheur Education Service District
- Multnomah Education Service District
- North Central Education Service District
- Northwest Regional Education Service District
- Region 18 - Wallowa Education Service District
- South Coast Education Service District
- Southern Oregon Education Service District
- Willamette Education Service District

== Former school districts ==
- Lawen School District - In 1988 it merged into the Crane school district (the elementary school had closed in 1984 and never reopened).
- Burns Union High School District - Merged into Harney district 3 in 1989.
- Burns Elementary School District - Merged into Harney district 3 in 1989.
- Hines Elementary School District - Merged into Harney district 3 in 1989.
- Brogan School District - Merged into the Vale school district as per an unofficial 1992 vote count.
- Willowcreek School District - Merged into the Vale school district as per an unofficial 1992 vote count.
- Vale Elementary School District - Merged into the Vale school district as per an unofficial 1992 vote count.
- Vale Union High School District - Merged into the Vale school district as per an unofficial 1992 vote count.
- Brothers School District - Merged into the Crook County district effective 2006.
- Hillsboro Union High School District - Merged into Hillsboro School District in 1996
- Hillsboro Elementary School District - Merged into Hillsboro School District in 1996
- North Plains School District - Merged into Hillsboro School District in 1996
- Farmington View School District - Merged into Hillsboro School District in 1996
- Groner School District - Merged into Hillsboro School District in 1996
- Reedville School District - Merged into Hillsboro School District in 1996
- West Union School District - Merged into Hillsboro School District in 1996
- Beaverton Union High School District - Merged into Beaverton School District in 1959
- Bethany School District - Merged into Sunset Valley School District in 1948
- Sunset Valley School District - Merged into Beaverton School District in 1959
- Raleigh School District - Merged into Beaverton School District in 1959
- McKinley School District - Merged into Beaverton School District in 1959
- McKay School District - Merged into Beaverton School District in 1959
- Hazeldale School District - Merged into Beaverton School District in 1959
- Garden Home School District - Merged into Beaverton School District in 1959
- Cooper Mountain School District - Merged into Beaverton School District in 1959
- Cedar Hills School District - Merged into Beaverton School District in 1959
- Cedar Mills School District - Merged into Beaverton School District in 1959
- Barnes School District - Merged into Beaverton School District in 1959
- Aloha-Huber School District - Merged into Beaverton School District in 1959
- Kinton School District - School closed and district consolidated into several school districts, including Groner, Midway, and McKay in 1948
- Jackson School District - Consolidated into West Union school district in 1946
- Helvetia School District - Consolidated into West Union school district in 1946
- Rock Creek School District - Consolidated into West Union school district in 1946
- Deer Lick School District - Merged into Scoggins School District in 1937
- Columbia Academy School District 21 - Merged into Hillsboro ESD in 1948
- Shute School District 19 - Merged into Hillsboro ESD in 1948
- Mountaindale School District 41 - Merged into Shady Brook School District 43 in 1948
- Arcade School District 59 - Merged into Shady Brook School District 43 in 1948
- Pleasant View School District 68 - Merged into Shady Brook School District 43 in 1948
- Chapman School District 20J - Merged into Sherwood ESD in 1945
- Middleton School District 22 - Merged into Sherwood ESD in 1945
- Criterion School District 85 - Consolidated into Maupin School District in 1953
- Bakeoven School District 49 - Consolidated into Maupin School District in 1953
- Seven Mile Hill School District 64 - Consolidated into Mosier School District in 1953
- Five Mile Creek School District 13 - Consolidated into Petersburg School District 14C in 1953
- Celilio-Fairbanks School District 15 - Consolidated into Petersburg School District 14C in 1953
- Fairfield School District 17 - Consolidated into Petersburg School District 14C in 1953
- Douglas Hollow School District 18 - Consolidated into Petersburg School District 14C in 1953
- Lower Eight Mile School District 22 - Consolidated into Petersburg School District 14C in 1953
- Dry Hollow School District 24 - Consolidated into The Dalles School District 12 in 1953
- Pleasant Ridge School District 26 - Consolidated into Petersburg School District 14C in 1953
- Upper Eight Mile School District 28 - Consolidated into Petersburg School District 14C in 1953
- Endersby School District 57 - Consolidated into Petersburg School District 14C in 1953
- Columbia School District 58 - Consolidated into Petersburg School District 14C in 1953
- Liberty School District 20 - Consolidated into Durfur School District 29C in 1953
- Boyd School District 21 - Consolidated into Dufur School District 29C in 1953
- Ramsey School District 27 - Consolidated into Dufur School District 29C in 1953
- Nansene School District 30 - Consolidated into Dufur School District 29C in 1953
- Center Ridge School District 33 - Consolidated into Dufur School District 29C in 1953
- Ireland School District 35 - Consolidated into Dufur School District 29C in 1953
- Railhollow School District 36 - Consolidated into Dufur School District 29C in 1953
- Kingsley School District 38 - Consolidated into Dufur School District 29C in 1953
- Harmony School District 39 - Consolidated into Dufur School District 29C in 1953
- Friend School District 69 - Consolidated into Dufur School District 29C in 1953
- Shell Rock School District 81 - Consolidated into Dufur School District 29C in 1953

== See also ==
- List of high schools in Oregon
- Lists of Oregon-related topics
