= Basque, Oregon =

Unincorporated community in the state of Oregon, United States

- Unincorporated community
- Location within Oregon Location within the United States
- Coordinates: 42°24′39″N 117°52′07″W
- Country: United States
- State: Oregon
- County: Malheur
- Elevation: 4,459 ft (1,359 m)
- Time zone: UTC-8 (Pacific)
  - Summer (DST): UTC-7 (Pacific)
- Area code: 541
- GNIS feature ID: 1136038

Basque is an unincorporated community in Malheur County, Oregon, United States. It lies along U.S. Route 95 about halfway between Burns Junction and McDermitt. Basque migrants, many of them sheepherders, settled in remote parts of southeastern Oregon between the 1880s and the 1930s.

== Education ==
It is in the McDermitt School District. The district sends its students to McDermitt Combined School of the Humboldt County School District of Nevada.
