= Fort McDermitt Paiute and Shoshone Tribe =

Federally recognized tribe on the Nevada and Oregon border

Coordinates: 41°55.184′N 117°42.485′W

Fort McDermitt Northern Paiute and Western Shoshone Tribes
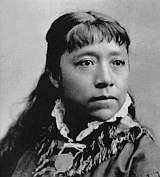
- Sarah Winnemucca, a Northern Paiute activist and author, worked as an interpreter, scout and hospital matron at Fort McDermit from 1868 to 1873.

Total population
- 689 enrolled members (1992); 341 residents on reservation (2010)

Regions with significant populations
- United States (Nevada, Oregon)

Languages
- Northern Paiute language, English

Religion
- Christianity, Sun Dance, Native American Church, Traditional Unity Movement

Related ethnic groups
- Southern Paiute and Western Shoshone peoples

The Fort McDermitt Paiute and Shoshone Tribe is a federally recognized tribe of Northern Paiute and Western Shoshone peoples, whose reservation Fort McDermitt Paiute and Shoshone Tribes of the Fort McDermitt Indian Reservation spans the Nevada and Oregon border next to Idaho. The reservation has 16,354 acres (6,618 ha) in Nevada and 19,000 acres (7,700 ha) in Oregon.

Peoples from these two tribes have historically also lived in what is now defined as southwestern Idaho. They are close culturally and linguistically to the Bannock people and various other Shoshone-language peoples. Peoples of these tribes are members of other federally recognized tribes in Nevada and Idaho.

In October 2016 a federal law was passed to put approximately 19,094 acres of Bureau of Land Management (BLM) land into trust for the Tribe in order to expand their reservation; this was done under the Nevada Native Nations Land Act. Gambling is prohibited on the new lands.

== Reservation ==
Location of Fort McDermitt Indian Reservation

The Fort McDermitt Indian Reservation spans the distance of the Nevada–Oregon border, in Humboldt County, Nevada and Malheur County, Oregon, near the Quinn River, which runs east to west through the Tribe's Nevada lands. Just to the east is southwestern Idaho. The Fort McDermitt Military Reservation was established 14 August 1865 at the former site of Quinn River Camp No. 33 and a stagecoach stop, Quinn River Station, in what was a traditional seasonal homeland of the Paiute, Shoshone and Bannock peoples.

The reservation was established with 16,354 acres (66.2 km^{2}) in Nevada and 19,000 acres (76.9 km^{2}) in Oregon, mostly areas of arid land. In October 2016 the federal government put into trust for the tribe approximately 19,094 acres (77.3 km^{2}) acres of Bureau of Land Management (BLM) land in Nevada, in order to expand their reservation and give them a more sustainable base. Gaming is prohibited on these new lands. This was done under the Nevada Native Nations Land Act (PL No: 114-232).

=== History ===
Originally the fort was established to protect the stagecoach route from Virginia City through Winnemucca, Nevada to Silver City, Idaho Territory, in the southwestern part of the area. It was named after Lt. Col. Charles McDermit, commander of the Military District of Nevada, who was killed in a skirmish in the area in 1865.

The Paiute had traditional territory ranging from the Southwest up into Nevada, Oregon and southwestern Idaho. The Paiute in this area became known as the "Northern Paiute." They are related culturally and linguistically to the Shoshone, Bannock and other tribes of the region.

When the military outpost was closed in 1889, the Military Reservation was adapted as the Fort McDermitt Indian Agency. Northern Paiute and Shoshone were settled here. In 1936 the federal government established an Indian reservation to support the tribe's organizing as the Paiute and Shoshone Tribe under the Indian Reorganization Act of 1934. They had to give up their traditional, hereditary chiefs as leaders in favor of an elected, representative form of government.

== Government ==
The Tribes drafted a Constitution and Bylaws (which were approved after changes by the US Bureau of Indian Affairs). It also had a Corporate Charter (drafted by the federal government and containing provisions not required by the Indian Reorganization Act of 1934.) On May 6, 1936 the new Constitution, ByLaws and Corporate Charter was approved by 54 of 65 available voters.

The government has an elected chairman and an elected eight-member Tribal Council, including a vice chairman.

As at the 2010 census, 313 Native Americans lived on the reservation, with 42 enrolled members living in nearby McDermitt, Oregon. More tribal members than "enrolled" tribal members live on the Reservation. The Tribe's Constitution and laws have some conflicting definitions of tribal members.

The Constitution defines tribal members as:

- the "original allottees in 1936,
- [at birth] such of their descendants [who] maintain a bona-fide residence on the [Reservation]", and
- "every child of one-fourth or more Indian blood both of whose parents are members of the . . . Tribe" (see Constitution and ByLaws, Article II, Section 1(a), (b))). Thus the people do not need to be enrolled citizens to be considered members.

The Constitution and ByLaws allow the Tribal Council to enroll two classes of People; see id., Article II, Section 2(a),(b). The confusion was created in the 1980s. At a time when Northern Paiute land claims funds were about to be disbursed, federal officials suggested that the Tribal Council enact an "Enrollment Ordinance" to define membership qualifications of the Tribe and noted that only the council had authority to do this. The ordinance did not address conflicts with standing definitions of members, as noted above (and in Article II, Section 1(a) and (b)).

== Language ==
The tribe speaks the Northern Paiute language, also known as Paviotso, which is a Western Numic language. Fort McDermitt has the greatest concentration of Northern Paiute speakers among the various locations where they live. 20–30% of the tribe's children can speak the language.

== Communities ==
- Fort McDermitt, Nevada

== Education ==
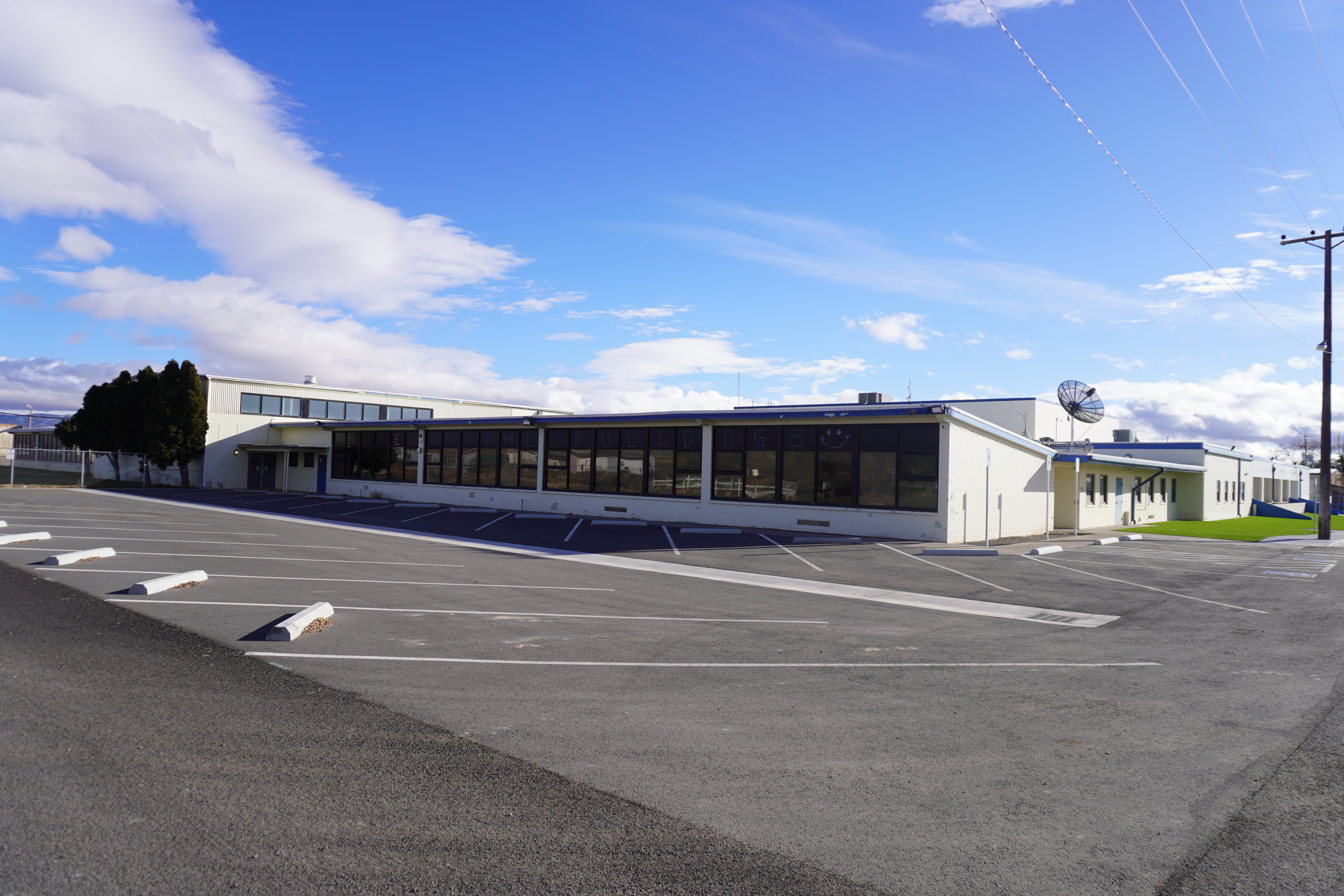
McDermitt Combined School

Humboldt County School District operates the McDermitt Combined School, a kindergarten–twelfth grade (K–12) school, in the Nevada side. The Nevada side of the reservation is zoned to that district.

The Oregon side of the reservation is zoned to McDermitt School District 51, a school district, governed by a board of directors, which sends all of its students to McDermitt Combined in Nevada and which does not have any employees.

Humboldt County is in the service area of Great Basin College. That college maintains the GBC Center in Winnemucca. The section of Malheur County in which the Oregon side of the reservation is located in is not in any community college district.

McDermitt has a public library, a branch of the Humboldt County Library.

== Notable tribal members and residents ==
- Sarah Winnemucca
- Chief Winnemucca, also known as Old Winnemucca, Sarah's father and a war leader
