= Fort McDermitt, Nevada =

- Census-designated place
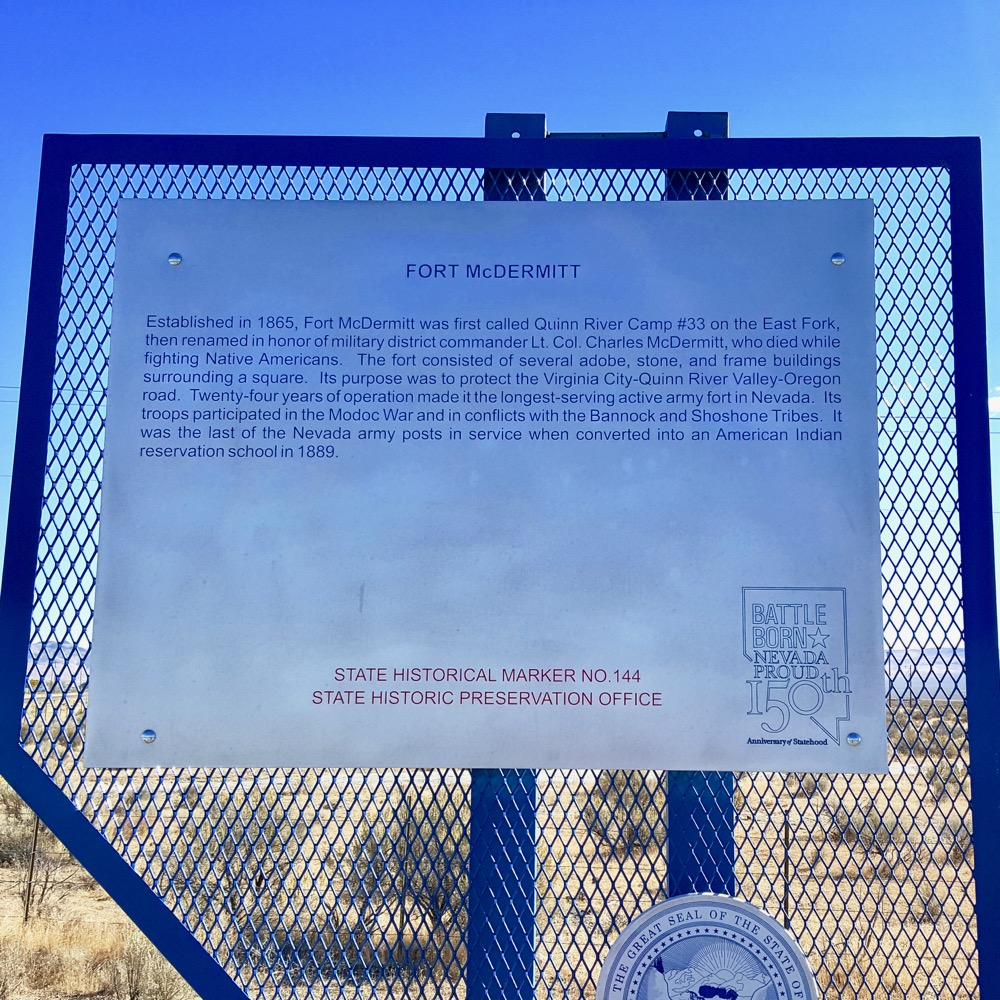
- Fort McDermitt Historical Marker

- Location of Fort McDermitt, Nevada
- Coordinates: 41°56′35″N 117°42′27″W
- Country: United States
- State: Nevada

Area
  - Total: 17.97 sq mi (46.54 km^{2})
  - Land: 17.97 sq mi (46.54 km^{2})
  - Water: 0 sq mi (0.00 km^{2})
- Elevation: 4,587 ft (1,398 m)

Population (2020)
  - Total: 267
  - Density: 14.9/sq mi (5.74/km^{2})
- Time zone: UTC-8 (Pacific (PST))
  - Summer (DST): UTC-7 (PDT)
- Area code: 775
- FIPS code: 32-25490
- GNIS feature ID: 2583924

Fort McDermitt is a census-designated place (CDP) in Humboldt County, Nevada, United States. As of the 2020 census, Fort McDermitt had a population of 267. It overlaps the Fort McDermitt Indian Reservation and lies just south of the McDermitt CDP.

== Geography ==
According to the United States Census Bureau, the Fort McDermitt CDP has an area of 17.9 square miles (46.4 km^{2}), all land. U.S. Route 95 runs through the CDP, leading north to Oregon and western Idaho and south 70 miles (110 km) to Winnemucca, Nevada.

== Demographics ==
Historical population
Census	Pop.	Note	%±
2020	267		—
U.S. Decennial Census

== Education ==
The CDP is in the Humboldt County School District. McDermitt Combined School is in McDermitt.

== See also ==
- Fort McDermitt Paiute and Shoshone Tribe
