= Academy of Arts and Academics =

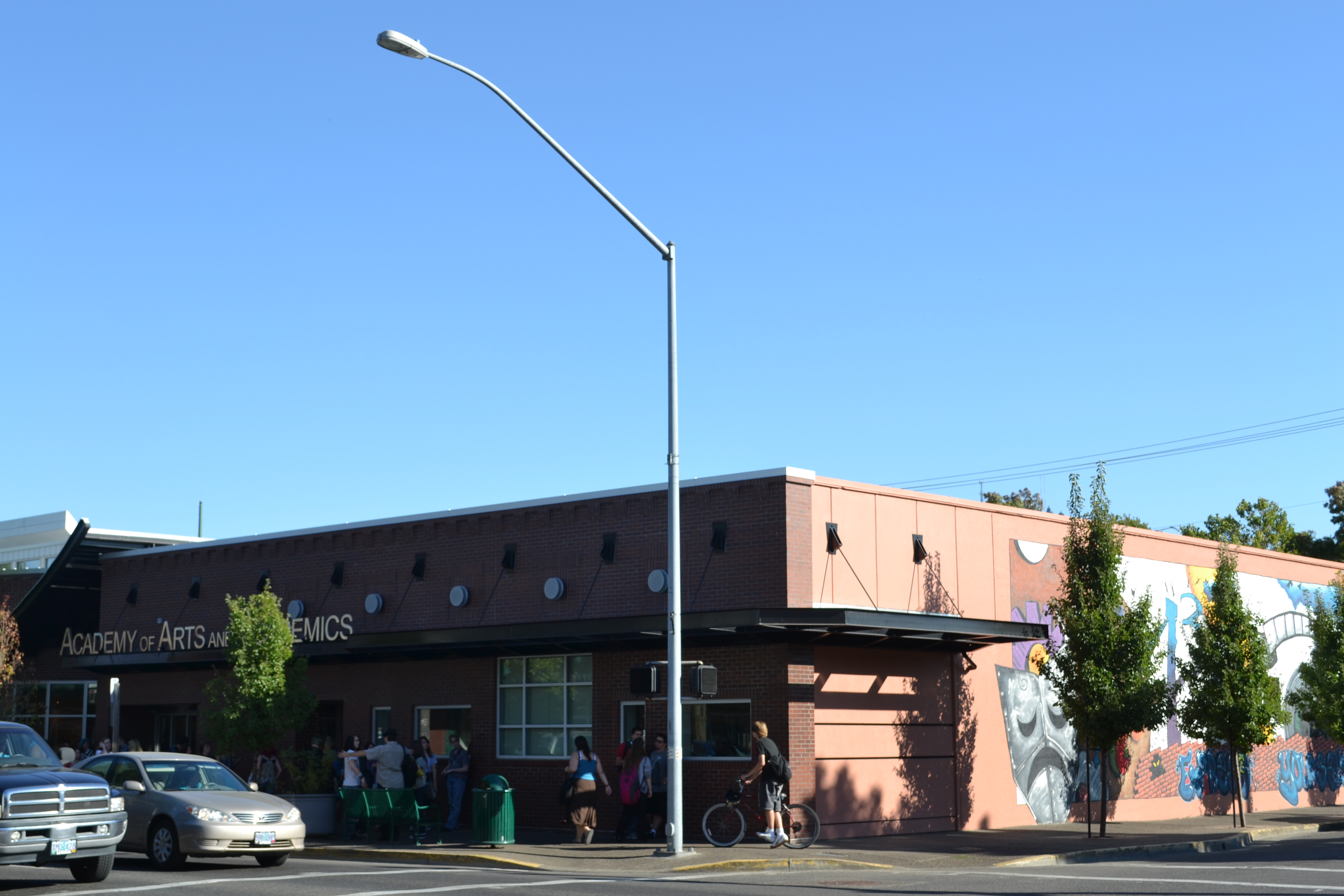

Location
- 615 Main Street; Springfield, (Lane County), Oregon 97477; United States; 44.045974°N 123.018057°W

Information
- Type: Public
- School district: Springfield School District
- Principal: Ame Beard
- Grades: 9-12
- Enrollment: 351 (2016-17)
- Website: a3.springfield.k12.or.us

Academy of Arts and Academics (A3) is a public high school in downtown Springfield, Oregon, United States. The school allows students the chance to pursue an education in the art form of their choice, from visual to theatrical to music composition to many others. The school encourages students to integrate their arts into their academic projects. At the end of each semester, students showcase their projects in a "Confluence".

== Academics ==
In 2008, the school did not give out high school diplomas, due to the fact that it was a new school, and they did not have a senior class.

In the 2008-2009 state report card, 86% of students met or exceeded standards for English/Language arts (the state average was 66%), 57% met or exceeded standards for mathematics (the state average was 54%), and 74% met or exceeded standards for science (the state average was 58%). The school did not meet standards for attendance, with a 91.4% attendance rate, but still was over the state average of 91.3%. The school did not meet the federal Adequate Yearly Progress rating.

Academy of Arts and Academics became a charter school in 2010, but reversed the decision in 2018 due to a loss of confidence in the governing board by the school district. It is an alternative choice school as of 2019.

== Health and science ==
In 2012, A3 opened a health and science campus located two blocks from the main campus. Students may attend either campus, but not both. The campus focuses on incorporating science and health topics into in-depth, independently driven projects.

== Media arts ==
Media students have had internships at several local news stations, including KMTR and KEZI. Media students have also won awards at local film festivals.
