= Gateways High School =

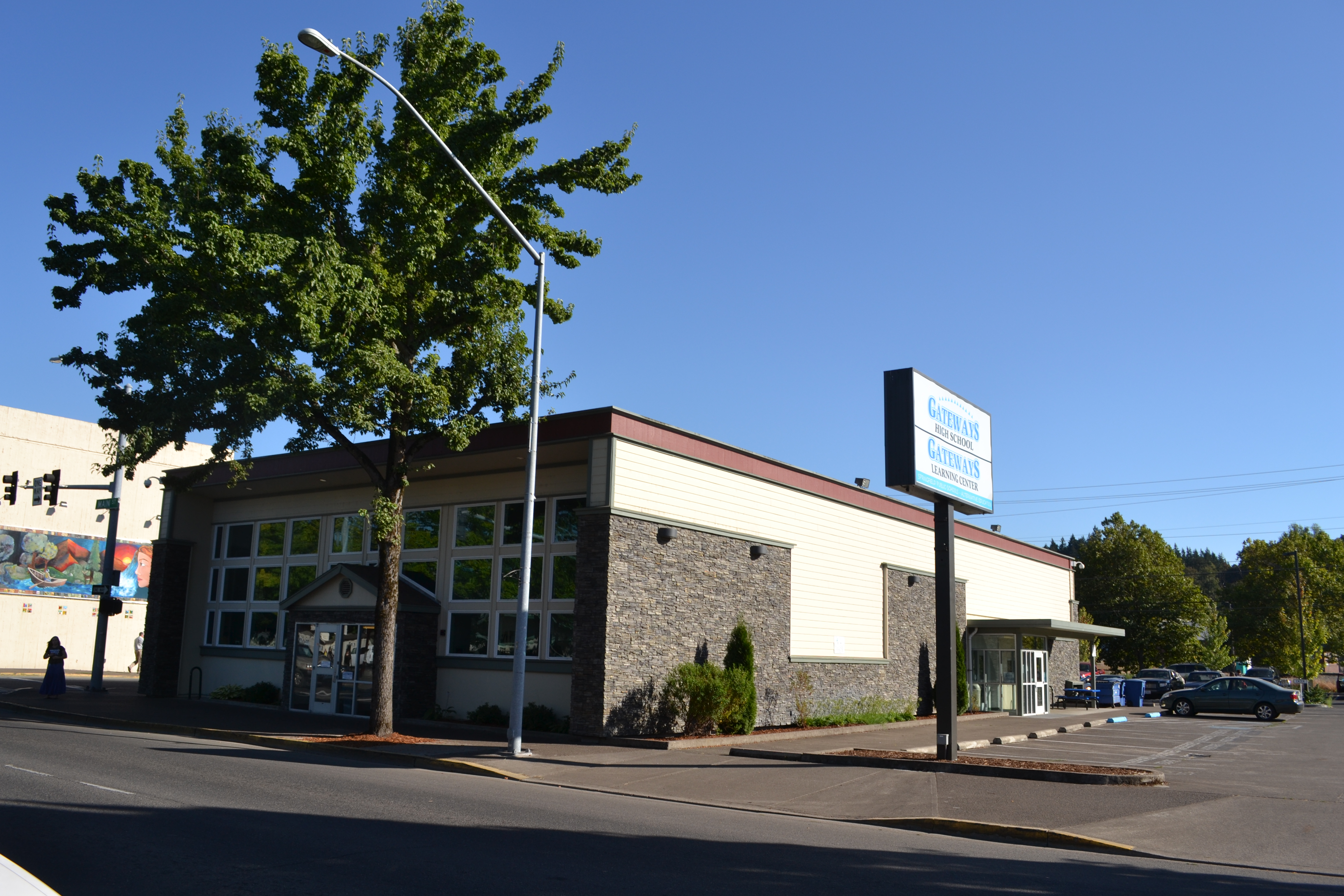

Location
- 425 10th Street; Springfield, Lane County, Oregon 97477; United States; 44.046084°N 123.017065°W

Information
- Type: Public
- School district: Springfield School District
- Principal: Lesa Halley
- Grades: 10-12
- Enrollment: 100 (2023-2024)
- Newspaper: Rising Times
- Yearbook: Olympiad
- Website: brattain.springfield.k12.or.us/our-programs/ghs

Gateways High School is a public high school of choice in downtown Springfield, Oregon, United States.

== Academics ==
In 2008, 55% of the school's seniors received their high school diploma. Of 49 students, 27 graduated, 15 dropped out, and 7 are still in high school.
