= Colton School District =

Colton School District may refer to:

- Colton Joint Unified School District, California, United States
- Colton School District, Colton, Oregon
- Colton School District, rural school districts in Washington state, United States
