= Melody Carlson =

American author

- Born: March 2, 1956 (age 70); San Francisco, California, U.S.
- Education: Springfield High School; Lane Community College
- Occupation: Author
- Writing career
- Notable works: Diary of a Teenage Girl, Homeward
- Notable awards: RITA award – Inspirational Romance; 1998 Homeward

Melody Carlson (born March 2, 1956) is an American author. She has written over 250 books for women, teens and children, including the Diary of a Teenage Girl series.

Carlson was born March 2, 1956, in San Francisco, California. She grew up in Springfield, Oregon, and went to Springfield High School and later Lane Community College. She lives in Sisters, Oregon.

== Awards and reception ==
- 1998 - Romance Writers of America RITA Award, Inspirational Romance – Homeward
