= Colton High School =

Colton High School may refer to one of several high schools in the United States:

- Colton High School (California)
- Colton High School (Oregon)
