= Clackamas Education Service District =

Education service district in Oregon, United States

Coordinates: 45.4267°N 122.5637°W

Address
- 13455 Southeast 97th Avenue Clackamas, Oregon, 97015; United States

District information
- Type: Public
- NCES District ID: 4180505

Students and staff
- Teachers: 28.0
- Staff: 158.06

Other information
- Website: www.clackesd.k12.or.us

Clackamas Education Service District is an education service district that coordinates school events and activities throughout the school districts in Clackamas County, Oregon. Clackamas ESD serves the educational needs of students and families in Clackamas County – a geographic area of 1,879 square miles.

Clackamas ESD is governed by a citizen-elected Board of Directors and an appointed advisor representing employment training. Five of the Board positions represent geographical zones and two are designated at-large. All members serve four-year terms.

== Administration ==
The superintendent is Larry Didway, who has been serving since 2021. An assistant superintendent, four service area directors and an executive assistant provide support. A board of directors,five are elected by zone, and two at-large, are elected to four-year terms countywide.

== Districts ==
CESD serves the following School districts:

- Canby School District
- Colton School District
- Estacada School District
- Gladstone School District
- Molalla River School District
- Lake Oswego School District
- North Clackamas School District
- Oregon City School District
- Oregon Trail School District
- West Linn-Wilsonville School District

== See also ==
- List of school districts in Oregon
