= Colton, Oregon =

Unincorporated community in the state of Oregon, United States

Colton
- Unincorporated community
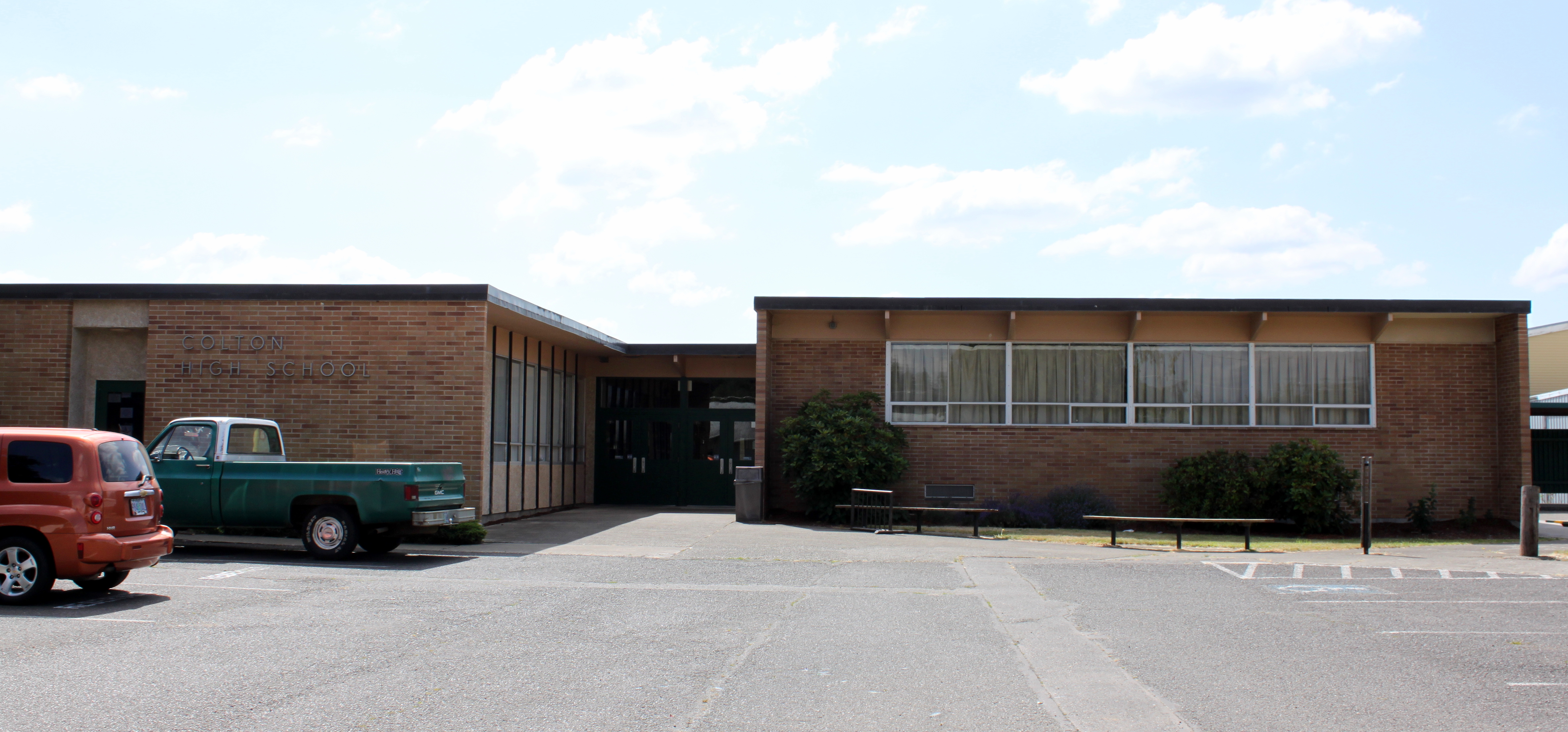
- Colton High School

- Location within the state of Oregon Colton (the United States)
- Coordinates: 45°10′19″N 122°26′16″W
- Country: United States
- State: Oregon
- County: Clackamas
- Established: 1892
- Elevation: 705 ft (215 m)
- Time zone: UTC-8 (Pacific (PST))
  - Summer (DST): UTC-7 (PDT)
- ZIP codes: 97017
- GNIS feature ID: 1119161

Colton is an unincorporated community located in Clackamas County, Oregon, United States, on Oregon Route 211. Colton is located between the cities of Estacada and Molalla.

Colton was named in about 1892 by two residents, Joshua Gorbett and a man named Cole, who each wanted to name the community after the other. The Post Office Department thought "Gorbett" would be confused with Corbett, so the community was named "Colton" instead. The Colton post office was established the same year.

Camp Colton, Colton Lutheran Church, Colton Market, Clyde & Bob's, Colton Cafe, Fir Valley, and the volunteer Colton Fire Station are Colton primary landmarks.

Colton areas include the communities/neighborhoods of: Old Colton, Elwood, Cedardale, Highland, Clarks, Dickey Prairie, and Fernwood. These areas are primarily where original schools, granges or stores were once located. Some of the original structures remain. In Elwood the school house is now the community center and the old Church is still open for business, along with the Elwoid cemetery.

== Geography ==
Colton is located on Milk Creek, a tributary of the Molalla River, in a broad (narrow) canyon eroded in a plateau of volcanic basalts and ash of the nearby Western Cascades.

The area is still primarily Douglas fir timber lands. Surrounded by farms, including Christmas trees, cattle and goats, horticulture.

== Education ==
Primary and secondary students in Colton are served by the Colton School District, which includes Colton Elementary School, Colton Middle School, Colton High School.

== Notable people ==
- Stella Nickell, convicted murderer, was born in Colton. Nickell poisoned her husband Bruce, and also a complete stranger, Sue Snow, and is currently serving her 90 year concurrent sentences in a federal prison in Hazelton, West Virginia.
