= Education service district (Oregon) =

Education unit in Oregon, United States

An education service district (ESD) is a regional education unit in the U.S. state of Oregon. ESDs work to provide the various counties' school districts with a wide array of educational programs and services, many of which are too costly or limited in demand for a single location. By coordinating a program or service among multiple districts, Oregon ESDs are able to moderate costs.

== Scope of service ==
An ESD's scope includes but is not limited to: curriculum, instructional support and assessment, business operations, transportation, youth employment, printing, public relations, data processing, payroll, fingerprinting, network support, statewide computer networks, traffic safety education, construction management, preschool programs, homeless transportation, para-educator training, and special education.

== List of ESDs ==
Oregon currently has 19 ESDs:

- Clackamas ESD (Clackamas)
- Columbia Gorge ESD (The Dalles)
- Douglas ESD (Roseburg)
- Grant ESD (John Day)
- Harney ESD (Burns)
- High Desert ESD (Redmond)
- InterMountain ESD (Pendleton)
- Jefferson ESD (Madras)
- Lake ESD (Lakeview)
- Lane ESD (Eugene)
- Linn Benton Lincoln ESD (Albany)
- Malheur ESD (Vale)
- Multnomah ESD (Portland)
- North Central ESD (Condon)
- Northwest Regional ESD (Hillsboro)
- Region 18 ESD (Enterprise)
- South Coast ESD (Coos Bay)
- Southern Oregon ESD (Medford)
- Willamette ESD (Salem)

== See also ==
- List of school districts in Oregon
