= Diary of a Teenage Girl =

Christian young adult novel series by Melody Carlson

- Author: Melody Carlson
- Country: United States
- Language: English
- Publisher: WaterBrook Multnomah (a division of Random House)
- Published: 2000-present
- Media type: Paperback

Diary of a Teenage Girl is a series of Christian young adult novels written by Melody Carlson.

== Main characters ==
Each of the series' major characters has serious family problems, but find their faith a grounding influence.

- Caitlin O'Connor appeared first in the series. She struggled with friendship, her parents' near divorce, and the pressures of high school without a boyfriend. In her second last year of high school she broke into the popular crowd; however, she realized that being popular is not all it was cut out to be. When she began dating her long-term crush, Josh Miller, she soon discovered the relationship put her into compromising situations. Having recently committed her life to God, she then made another vow to 'kiss dating goodbye' in order to protect herself from compromising her convictions. While Josh and Caitlin did not date, they remained good friends. In college she was a role model for younger girls, particularly Josh's little sister, Chloe Miller. The fifth and final book, "I do," Josh proposed to her.
- Josh Miller is Chloe's older brother and Caitlin O'Connor's high school sweetheart and husband. First appearing in 'Becoming Me', Book 1 of the Caitlin O'Connor series, he is initially a jerk who breaks Caitlin's heart. Described as having 'Matt Damon good looks,' Josh is a typical high school jock. In college, he matures, eventually becoming a youth pastor and marrying Caitlin.
- Chloe Miller was featured in the next series of books following Caitlin O'Connor. During these books, Chloe formed and became the leader of an all-girl Christian rock band and went on a tour of the United States with another Christian band. Problems arose when she became romantically involved with the other band's leader, an older boy with a girlfriend at home.
- Kim Peterson was adopted as an infant from Korea and raised as an only child. She wrote a teen advice column while struggling with her adoptive mother's death, her best friend's teen pregnancy, and her first contact with her birth mother.
- Maya Stark was the newest "teenage girl" in the series. Maya had a famous father, but her parents had divorced, causing her to struggle with her racial identity. After her mother had returned to using drugs and was arrested, Maya was sent to spend the summer with relatives, who turn out to be Kim Peterson, who appears in earlier books in the series.

== Books ==
=== Caitlin Series ===
- Becoming Me (August 2000, ISBN 1-57673-735-7)
- It's My Life (July 2001, ISBN 1-59052-053-X)
- Who I Am (March 2002, ISBN 1-57673-890-6)
- On My Own (July 2002, ISBN 1-59052-017-3)
- I Do (January 2005, ISBN 1-59052-320-2)

=== Chloe Series ===
- My Name Is Chloe (January 2003, ISBN 1-59052-018-1)
- Sold Out (June 2003, ISBN 1-59052-141-2)
- Road Trip (December 2003, ISBN 1-59052-142-0)
- Face the Music (May 2004, ISBN 1-59052-241-9)

=== Kim Series ===
- Just Ask (July 2005, ISBN 1-59052-321-0)
- Meant to Be (September 2005, ISBN 1-59052-322-9)
- Falling Up (January 2006, ISBN 1-59052-324-5)
- That Was Then... (May 2006, ISBN 1-59052-425-X)

=== Maya Series ===
- A Not-So-Simple Life (July 2008, ISBN 1-60142-117-6)
- It's a Green Thing (February 2009, ISBN 1-60142-118-4)
- What Matters Most (September 2009, ISBN 1-60142-119-2)
