= Springfield School District (Oregon) =

Public school district in Oregon

Address
- 640 A Street Springfield, Oregon, 97477; United States

District information
- Grades: PreK–12
- Superintendent: Mr. Todd Hamilton
- Schools: 20
- NCES District ID: 4111670

Students and staff
- Students: 9,779 (2020–2021)
- Teachers: 527.61 (on an FTE basis)
- Staff: 765.45 (on an FTE basis)
- Student–teacher ratio: 18.53:1

Other information
- Website: www.springfield.k12.or.us

Springfield School District 19, also called Springfield Public Schools, is a public school district in Lane County, Oregon, United States. It serves students in most Springfield, as well as some outlying areas, including Goshen, Mohawk, and Walterville, as well as portions of Marcola.

== Schools ==
There are 20 schools in the Springfield School District. Nearly 11,000 students attend schools in the district.

=== Elementary schools ===
- Centennial
- Douglas Gardens
- Guy Lee
- Maple
- Mt. Vernon
- Page
- Ridgeview
- Riverbend
- Thurston
- Two Rivers-Dos Rios
- Walterville
- Yolanda

=== Middle schools ===
- Agnes Stewart
- Briggs
- Hamlin
- Thurston

=== High schools ===
- Academy of Arts and Academics
- Gateways High School
- Springfield High School
- Thurston High School

== See also ==
- List of school districts in Oregon
- Eugene School District, an adjacent district
- Lane Education Service District
