= Lane Education Service District =

Educational Service Provider to Lane County, Oregon

Address
- 1200 Highway 99 North Eugene, Oregon, 97402; United States
- Coordinates: 44°04′30.59″N 123°08′51.87″W

District information
- Type: Education service district
- Grades: 6–12
- NCES District ID: 4100032

Students and staff
- Teachers: 31.65 (on an FTE basis)
- Staff: 172.29 (on an FTE basis)

Other information
- Website: www.lesd.k12.or.us

Lane Education Service District (Lane ESD) is an education service district which provides services to the 16 school districts in Lane County, Oregon, United States. Its headquarters are at 1200 Highway 99N in Eugene.

== Administration ==
Lane ESD's superintendent is Tony Scurto. An assistant superintendent, three service area directors and an executive assistant provide support.

Lane ESD is governed by a citizen-elected Board of Directors and an appointed advisor representing employment training. Five of the Board positions represent geographical zones, and two are designated at-large. All members serve four-year terms.

== Districts ==
Lane ESD operates across the 16 school districts in Lane County:

- Bethel School District
- Blachly School District
- Creswell School District
- Crow-Applegate-Lorane School District
- Eugene School District 4J
- Fern Ridge School District
- Junction City School District
- Lowell School District
- Mapleton School District
- Marcola School District
- McKenzie School District
- Oakridge School District
- Pleasant Hill School District
- Siuslaw School District
- South Lane School District
- Springfield School District

== See also ==
- List of school districts in Oregon § Education service districts
