= Fort McDermit =

Coordinates: 41.972183°N 117.622318°W

Fort McDermitt
- Nevada (near McDermitt, Nevada)
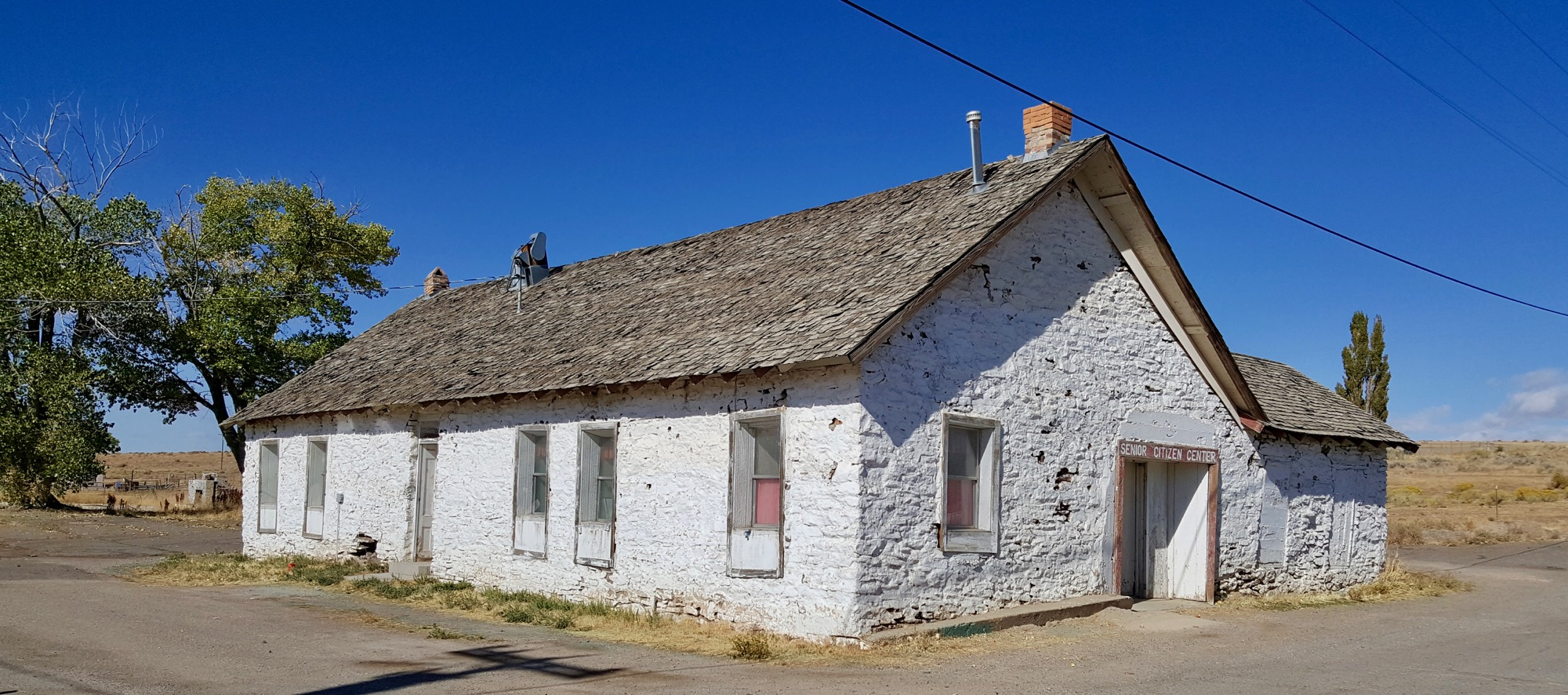
- Original building

Site information
- Type: Fort
- Controlled by: United States

Site history
- Built: 1866
- In use: 1865–1889
- Materials: adobe and stone
- Battles/wars: Indian Wars: Snake War; Modoc War; Bannock War

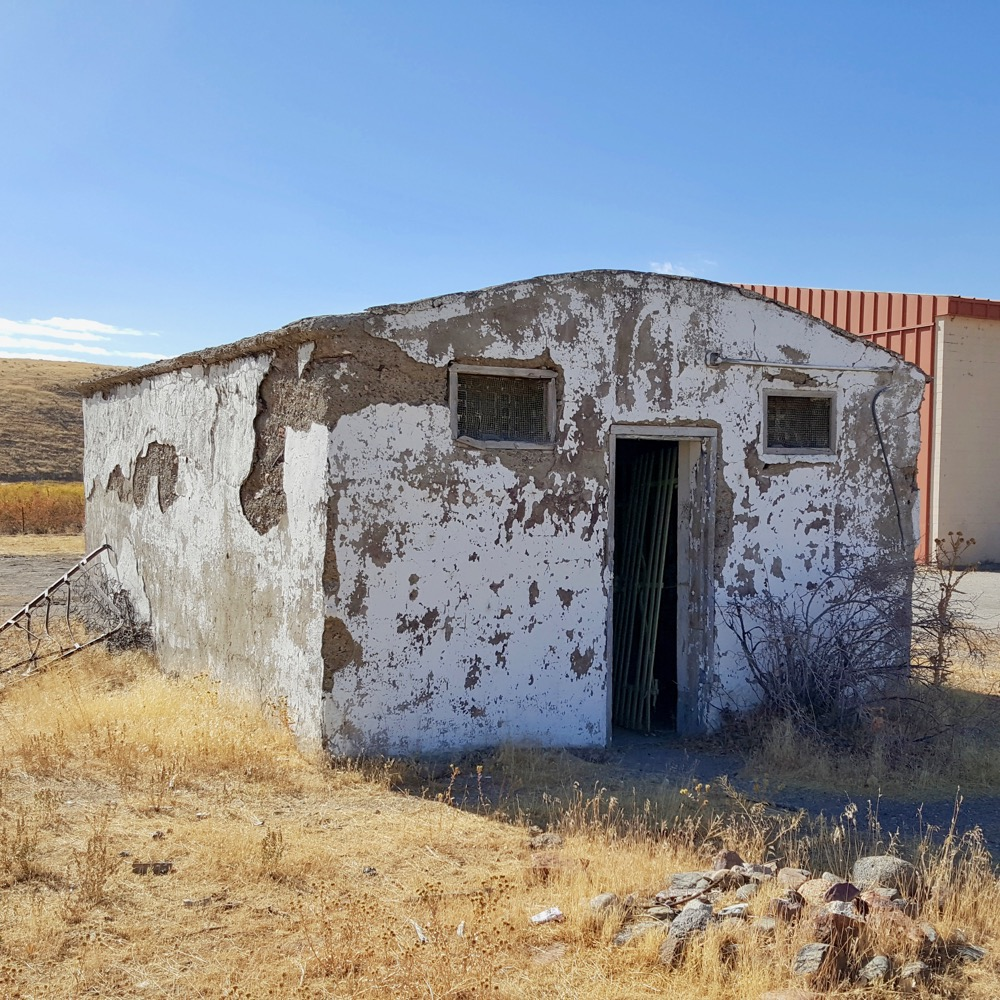
Former jail

Fort McDermit (or Fort McDermitt) (Original name in Northern Paiute: wayadiaga, meaning rye grass canyon) was a U.S. Army fort in Nevada. It was established on August 14, 1865, by Captain J. C. Doughty, of Company I of the 2nd Regiment California Volunteer Cavalry, on orders of Lt. Col. Charles McDermit, Commander, Military District Nevada, as Quinn River Camp No. 33. It was located near Quinn River Station on the East Fork of the Quinn River.

Attacks on white settlements in the early part of the Snake War prompted the District of Utah to establish a detachment at the stagecoach station called Quinn (or Queen) River Station. The volunteer cavalry detachment was there in order to protect the stagecoach line that ran between Winnemucca, Nevada and Silver City, Idaho Territory. McDermit's death in an ambush on August 7, 1865, along the Quinn River near the station and the continuing unrest provoked the establishment of a stronger force and the fort was named in his honor.

Fort McDermit was intended to hold a garrison of two companies one of cavalry and one of infantry. It was built around a rectangular parade ground measuring 600 by 285 feet (183 by 87 m). Permanent structures were first erected in 1866 and 1867 and consisted of three buildings for officers, a large barracks, a three-room hospital, storehouses (for supplies to keep the fort running for six months), and stables all surrounding a square. All of the post buildings were one-story with shingle roofs built of adobe, stone, or frame construction. Additional frame structures were added in the late 1870s. The post was expanded on September 3, 1867, to be two miles square with a two-mile-wide hay reserve extending along each side of the Quinn River for 5 miles (8 km). On October 4, 1870, this hay reserve was extended further up and down the river bringing the total to 10,374 acres (4,198 ha).

Fort McDermit's purpose was to protect the stage route and wagon road from Virginia City through Star City, Nevada, in the Quinn River Valley, to Boise City, Idaho. It was the longest active Army fort in Nevada, lasting 24 years. Its troops participated in operations against the Bannock and Shoshone Nations and in the Snake War, Bannock War, and the Modoc War. On July 24, 1889, as the last of the Nevada Army posts in service, it was turned over to the Indian Service. It was adapted for use as an Indian school on the Fort McDermitt Indian Reservation.

== See also ==
- McDermitt, Nevada-Oregon
- History of Nevada
- Nevada Historical Markers
