= Springfield High School (Oregon) =

School in Springfield, Oregon, United States

- Springfield High School in 2026

Location
- 875 7th Street; Springfield, Lane County, Oregon 97477; United States; 44.053365°N 123.016786°W

Information
- Type: Public
- Opened: 1921
- School district: Springfield School District
- Principal: José da Silva
- Grades: 9-12
- Enrollment: 1,300 (2023-2024)
- Colors: Blue, white, and black
- Athletics conference: OSAA Midwestern League 5A-4
- Mascot: Otto (miller man)
- Nickname: Millers
- Rival: Thurston high school
- Website: https://shs.springfield.k12.or.us/

Springfield High School was the first public high school in Springfield, Oregon, United States. It is one of four high schools in the Springfield School District.

== Academics ==
In 2008, 78% of the school's seniors received their high school diploma. Of 310 students, 243 graduated, 37 dropped out, 12 received a modified diploma, and 18 are still in high school.

== Notable alumni ==
- Jasmin Savoy Brown, actor; Yellowjackets, Scream 5
- Melody Carlson, award-winning novelist of more than 250 books
- Ken Kesey, Beat Generation author, One Flew Over the Cuckoo's Nest
- Greg McMackin, retired American football coach and former player
- Eric Millegan, actor; Bones
- Maria Mutola, Olympic Runner and gold medalist, multiple 800m World Champion
- Mercedes Russell, Center on Seattle Storm
