= Colton High School (Oregon) =

High school in Oregon

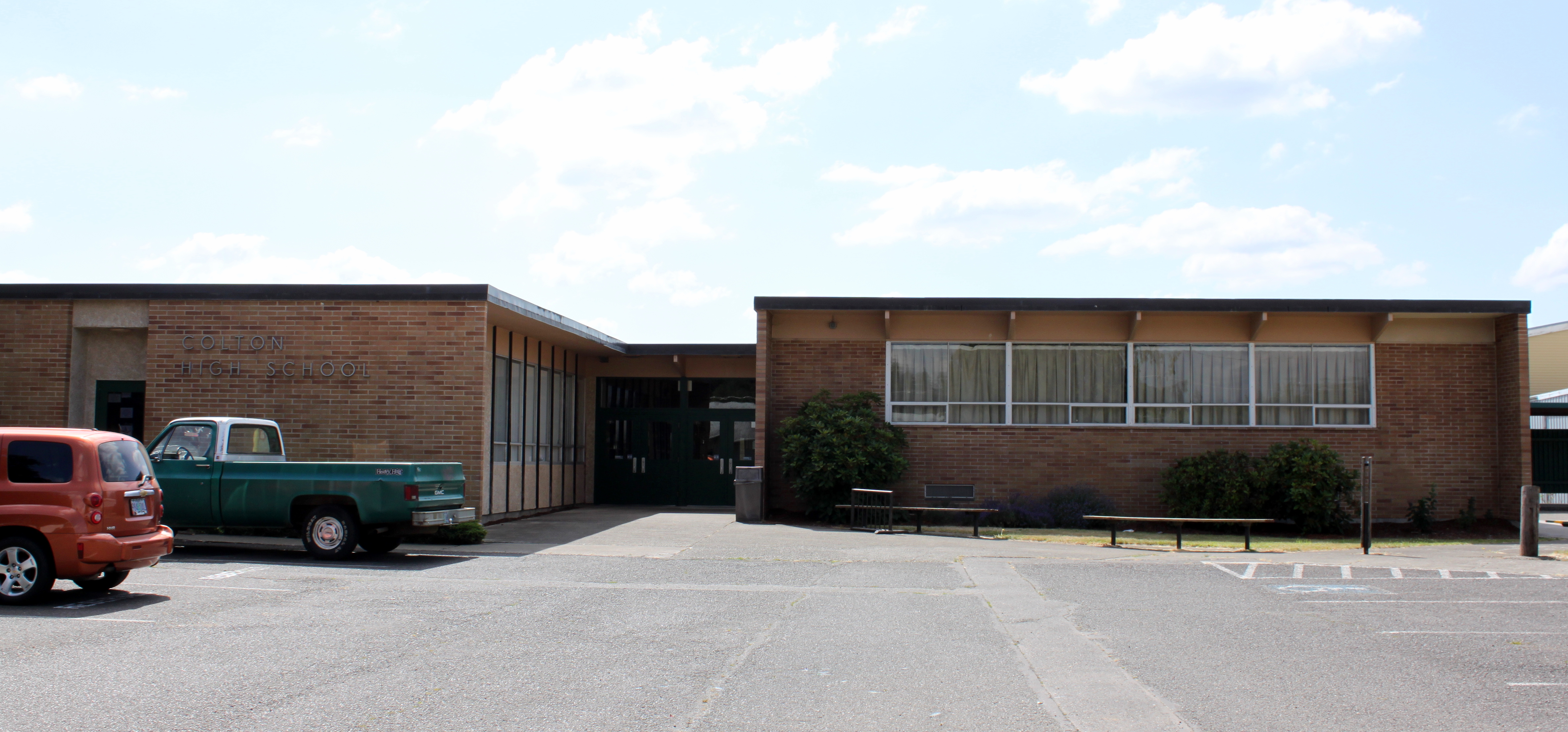

Location
- 30205 Wall Street; Colton, Clackamas County, Oregon 97017; United States; 45.170732°N 122.438325°W

Information
- Type: Public
- School district: Colton School District
- Principal: Travis Remmick
- Grades: 9-12
- Enrollment: 199 (2023-2024)
- Colors: Green and gold
- Athletics conference: OSAA Tri-River 2A-2
- Mascot: Viking

Colton High School is a public high school in Colton, Oregon, United States. It is a part of the Colton School District.

Colton High School is a small, rural high school tucked into the foothills of the Cascades in Western Oregon. They currently employ 13 teachers who are serving approximately 200 students. In 2010 the school was selected as a Model School by the International Center for Leadership in Education after a 5 year collaboration, data collection, and on-site direction from the Successful Practices Network. CHS students generally perform at or above the state averages on testing typically maintaining around a 90% graduation rate.

In 1987 the school's enrollment was decreasing, and so the school was seeking to change its athletic classification from the Oregon School Activities Association.

Jim Severson became the principal of the high school in summer 2026. The Oregon Small Schools Association designated Shane Bassett, the previous principal, as the organization's 2025-2026 Principal of the Year.

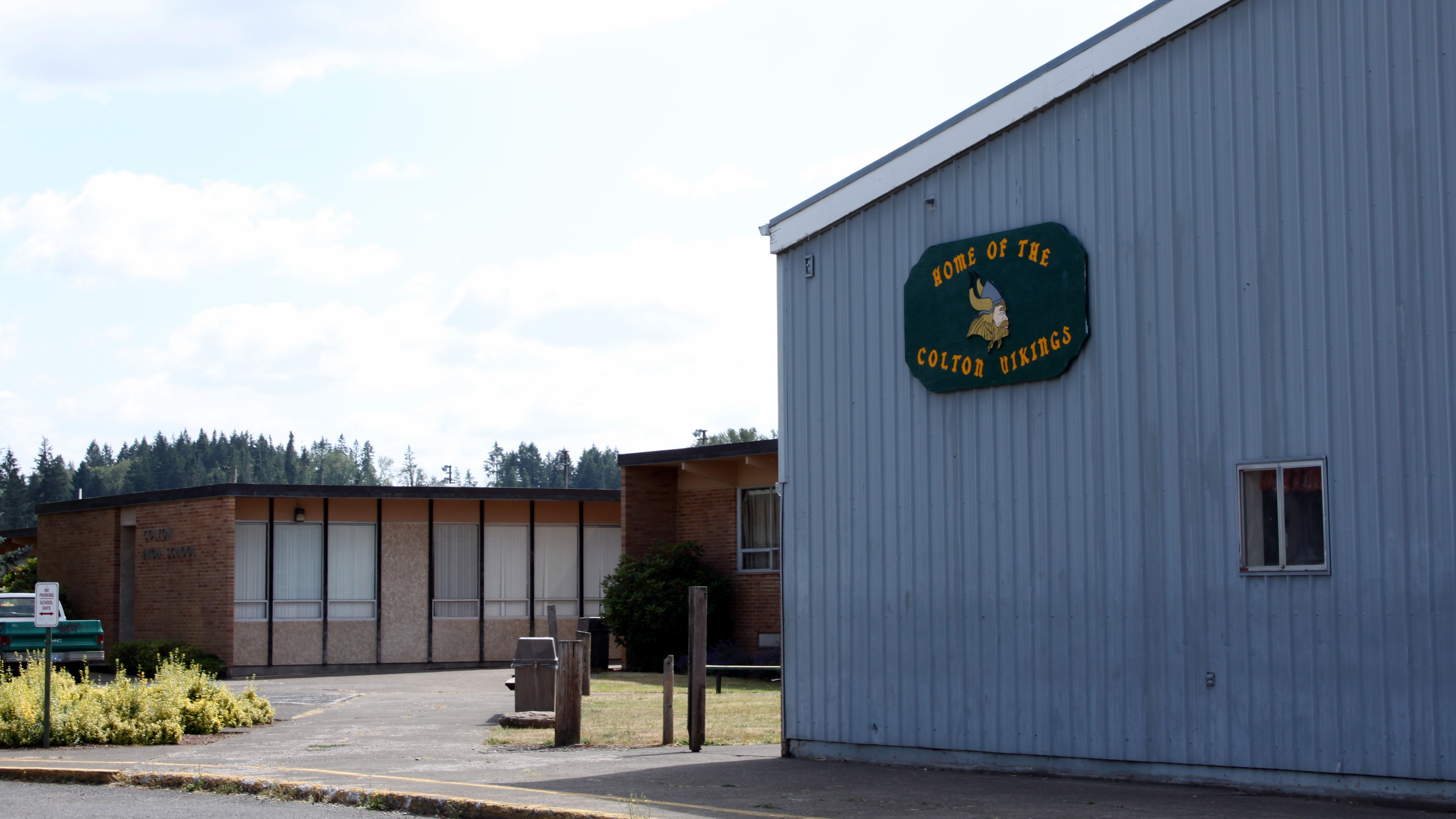
Gym and entrance
