= McDermitt, Nevada and Oregon =

Unincorporated community in the US

McDermitt
- Unincorporated community
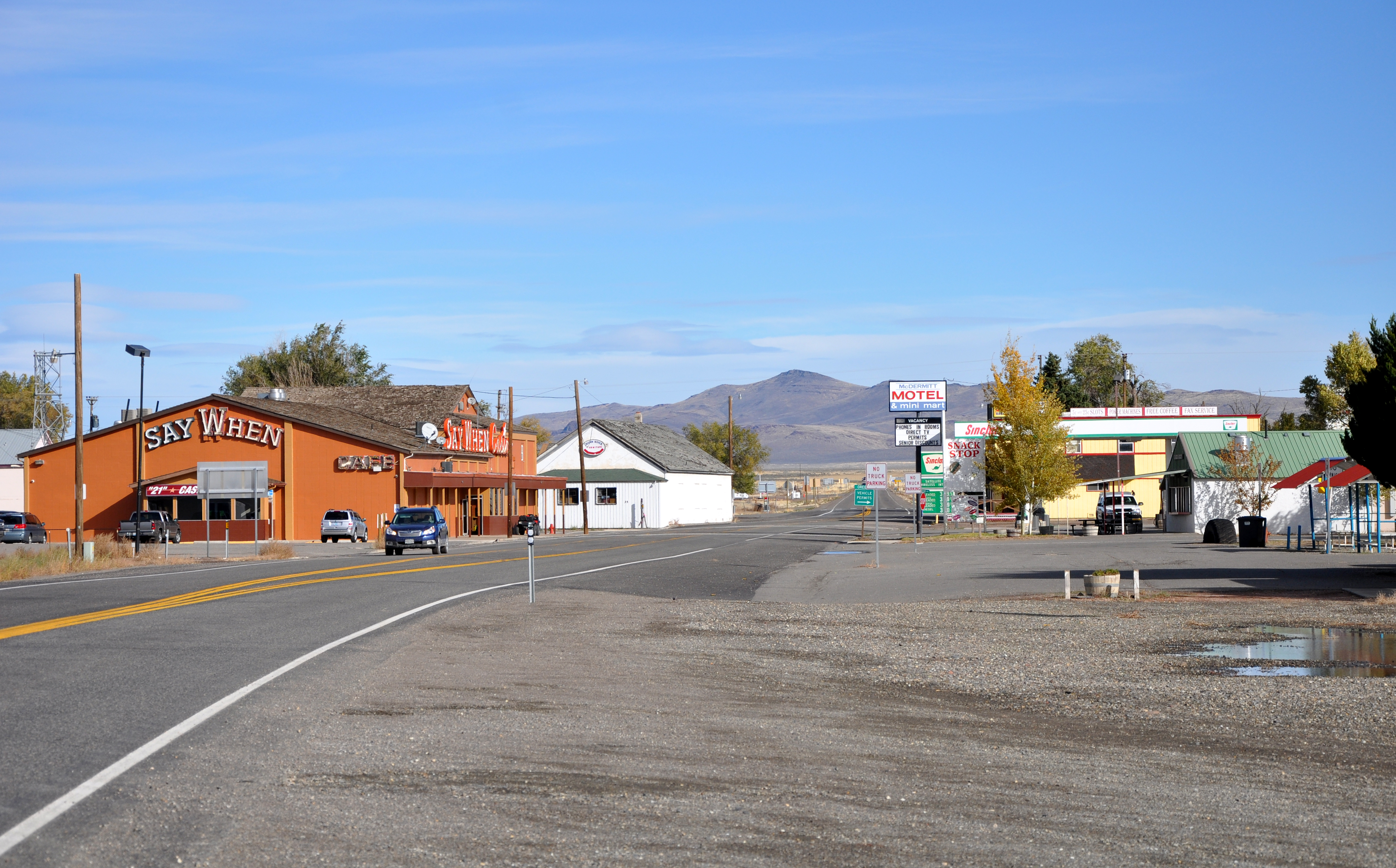
- Central McDermitt

- Location of McDermitt (Nevada side) in Humboldt County

- Location within Nevada Location within Oregon Location within the United States
- Coordinates: 41°59′25″N 117°43′15″W
- Country: United States
- State: Nevada and Oregon
- County: Humboldt County, Nevada, and Malheur County, Oregon
- Named for: Lt. Col. Charles McDermit, 2nd Cavalry, California Volunteers

Area
  - Total: 1.57 sq mi (4.06 km^{2})
  - Land: 1.57 sq mi (4.06 km^{2})
  - Water: 0 sq mi (0.00 km^{2})
- Elevation: 4,423 ft (1,348 m)

Population (2020)
  - Total: 124
  - Density: 79.2/sq mi (30.56/km^{2})
- Time zone: UTC-8 (PST)
  - Summer (DST): UTC-7 (PDT)
- ZIP codes: 89421 (NV) and 89425 (OR)
- Area codes: Area code 775 (NV), 458 and 541 (OR)
- FIPS code: 32-44000
- GNIS feature ID: 2408198

McDermitt is an unincorporated community straddling the Nevada–Oregon border, in Humboldt County, Nevada, and Malheur County, Oregon, United States. McDermitt's economy has historically been based on mining, ranching, and farming. The last mining operation closed in 1990, resulting in a steady decline in population.

As of the 2010 census, the combined population was 513. Seventy-five percent of the residents were American Indian, predominantly Northern Paiute of the Fort McDermitt Indian Reservation, whose members include Shoshone people.

== History ==
The community, originally called Dugout, was named after Fort McDermit. It was named after Lt. Col. Charles McDermit, commander of the Military District of Nevada, who was killed by Native Americans in a skirmish in the area in 1865. It is not known why there is a discrepancy in the spelling. Fort McDermit, which was five miles (8.0 km) outside the current township, was originally established to protect the stagecoach route from Virginia City through Winnemucca to Silver City, Idaho Territory. The stage road was the military's most important transportation route in southeast Oregon. The township of Dugout was established as support for Fort McDermit.

== Geography and climate ==
The community is on U.S. Highway 95, 73 miles (117 km) north of Winnemucca. The elevation of McDermitt is 4,432 feet (1,351 m) above sea level.

McDermitt is in the Oregon High Desert with a desert climate (Köppen climate classification BSk), averaging 9.2 inches (230 mm) of rain annually with hot, dry summers and cold winters. Most precipitation (47%) occurs from March through June. About 23% occurs from September through November, and 25% from December through February, much as snow.

Climate data for McDermitt, Nevada and Oregon, 1991–2020 normals, extremes 1892–present
Month	Jan	Feb	Mar	Apr	May	Jun	Jul	Aug	Sep	Oct	Nov	Dec	Year
Record high °F (°C)	64 (18)	69 (21)	84 (29)	89 (32)	96 (36)	105 (41)	107 (42)	107 (42)	106 (41)	94 (34)	74 (23)	65 (18)	107 (42)
Mean maximum °F (°C)	51.8 (11.0)	58.5 (14.7)	69.0 (20.6)	77.1 (25.1)	86.7 (30.4)	94.1 (34.5)	100.5 (38.1)	98.3 (36.8)	92.5 (33.6)	81.5 (27.5)	65.9 (18.8)	53.3 (11.8)	101.0 (38.3)
Mean daily maximum °F (°C)	40.7 (4.8)	46.1 (7.8)	54.8 (12.7)	61.0 (16.1)	70.9 (21.6)	80.6 (27.0)	91.8 (33.2)	90.1 (32.3)	80.8 (27.1)	66.2 (19.0)	50.8 (10.4)	39.6 (4.2)	64.5 (18.0)
Daily mean °F (°C)	29.0 (−1.7)	33.5 (0.8)	40.1 (4.5)	45.1 (7.3)	53.9 (12.2)	61.7 (16.5)	70.6 (21.4)	67.8 (19.9)	58.9 (14.9)	46.6 (8.1)	36.2 (2.3)	28.0 (−2.2)	47.6 (8.7)
Mean daily minimum °F (°C)	17.4 (−8.1)	21.0 (−6.1)	25.4 (−3.7)	29.3 (−1.5)	36.9 (2.7)	42.7 (5.9)	49.4 (9.7)	45.6 (7.6)	37.0 (2.8)	27.0 (−2.8)	21.5 (−5.8)	16.4 (−8.7)	30.8 (−0.7)
Mean minimum °F (°C)	−3.8 (−19.9)	2.7 (−16.3)	10.4 (−12.0)	15.1 (−9.4)	20.9 (−6.2)	28.9 (−1.7)	37.8 (3.2)	33.0 (0.6)	23.3 (−4.8)	10.7 (−11.8)	1.3 (−17.1)	−4.6 (−20.3)	−11.1 (−23.9)
Record low °F (°C)	−32 (−36)	−28 (−33)	−1 (−18)	6 (−14)	10 (−12)	20 (−7)	27 (−3)	20 (−7)	8 (−13)	−10 (−23)	−18 (−28)	−37 (−38)	−37 (−38)
Average precipitation inches (mm)	0.73 (19)	0.50 (13)	0.61 (15)	1.01 (26)	1.21 (31)	0.86 (22)	0.30 (7.6)	0.17 (4.3)	0.42 (11)	0.67 (17)	0.59 (15)	0.78 (20)	7.85 (200.9)
Average snowfall inches (cm)	4.5 (11)	3.8 (9.7)	1.9 (4.8)	1.7 (4.3)	0.0 (0.0)	0.0 (0.0)	0.0 (0.0)	0.0 (0.0)	0.0 (0.0)	0.4 (1.0)	2.4 (6.1)	6.1 (15)	20.8 (51.9)
Average precipitation days (≥ 0.01 in)	7.0	6.6	7.2	8.6	8.1	5.7	2.8	2.1	2.8	4.7	6.1	8.0	69.7
Average snowy days (≥ 0.1 in)	2.2	1.7	1.2	0.9	0.1	0.0	0.0	0.0	0.0	0.2	0.9	2.9	10.1
Source 1: NOAA
Source 2: XMACIS2

The McDermitt area boasts the longest climatic record in Nevada, with data beginning in 1866. The earliest Nevada climate stations were at Army posts. The U.S. Army Signal Corps was responsible for weather duty in the late 19th century and established the National Weather Service in 1870.

== Demographics ==
Historical population
Census	Pop.	Note	%±
2020	124		—
U.S. Decennial Census

For statistical purposes, the census bureau has allocated McDermitt two census-designated places (CDPs), McDermitt, Nevada and Fort McDermitt, Nevada. The Oregon portion of McDermitt is not part of the McDermitt CDP, but is included in the Ontario, OR–ID Micropolitan Statistical Area. Essentially the Fort McDermitt CDP entails the Fort McDermitt Indian Reservation and the McDermitt CDP entails the adjoining McDermitt township.

=== Fort McDermitt CDP ===
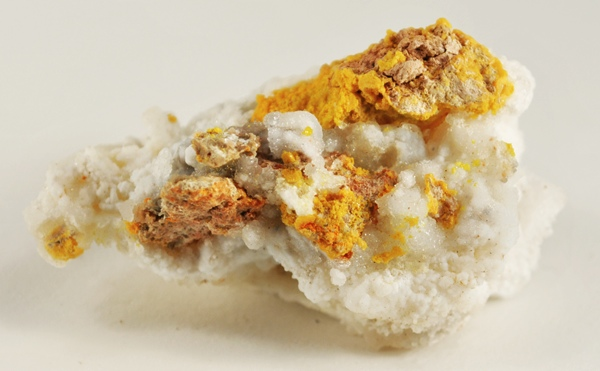
Kleinite (a rare mercury mineral) on calcite, from the Cordero Mine, McDermitt. Size: 4.9 x 3.1 x 2.6 cm.

As of the US census of 2010, there were 341 people, of which 30% were under the age of 18 years and 11% (39 people) over the age of 65 years. 92% (313 people) were American Indian, with 3.5% (12 people) described as being of two or more races, and 0.6% (two people) were White. There were 125 housing units with 86% (108) described as occupied. There were 108 males for every 100 females.

=== McDermitt CDP ===
As of the US census of 2010, there were 172 people, of which 18% were under the age of 18 years and 22% (38 people) over the age of 65 years. 24% (42 people) were American Indian, with 0% described as being of two or more races, and 68% (117 people) were White. There were 101 housing units with 77% (78) described as occupied. There were 110 males for every 100 females.

=== Ethnic groups ===
In 1937, the majority of the residents were Basque Americans.

== Economy ==
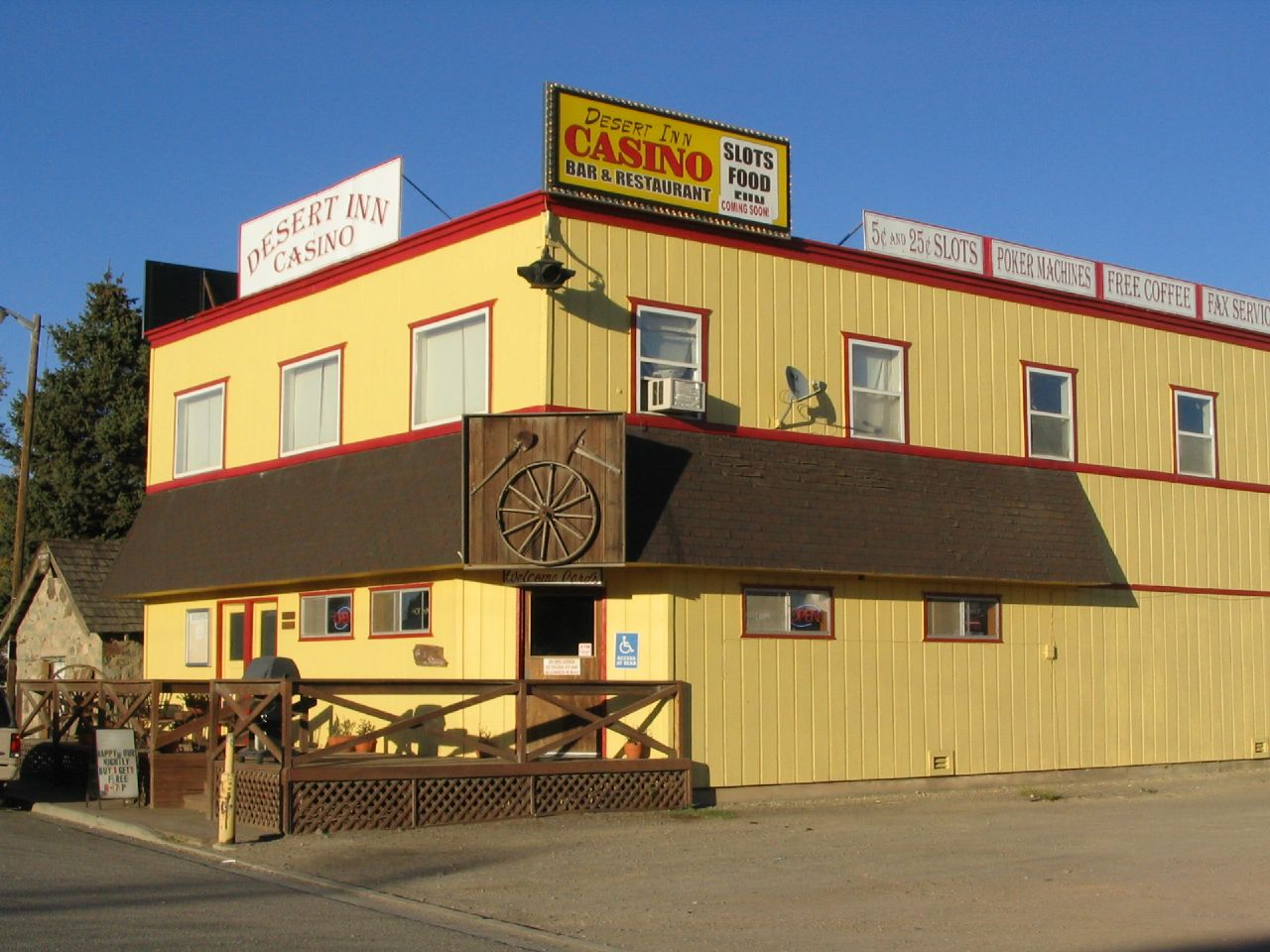
Desert Inn Casino

McDermitt's economy has historically been based on mining, ranching and farming. In the period 1917 to 1989 it was home to four nationally significant mercury mines in the McDermitt Caldera – Bretz, Opalite, Cordero and McDermitt – which from 1933 to 1989 were the largest producers in North America. In 1985 of the 16,530 flasks of mercury (each containing 76 pounds (34 kg) produced in the US, 16,337 came from the McDermitt Mine. The closure of mercury mining in 1990 resulted in a significant decline in population.

Significant gold mines in the nearby Santa Rosa Mountains were the National that produced in excess of 200,000 troy ounces (6,200 kg), and the Buckskin National that produced 24,000 troy ounces (750 kg) of gold and 300,000 troy ounces (9,300 kg) of silver over the period 1906–1941.

Current development activities that may result in renewed mining are at Cordero (gold and silver), Cordero (gallium), Buckskin-National (gold-silver), Aurora (uranium) and Disaster Peak (gold). The largest employers in McDermitt are the Say When Bar, Restaurant & Casino and the McDermitt Combined School.

== Government and infrastructure ==
The United States Postal Service has a post office in McDermitt.

In 1978 law enforcement services were provided by a deputy sheriff from the county.

== Health care ==
In 1978, the Fort McDermitt Indian Reservation would send a paramedic in the case of a medical emergency.

== Points of interest ==
The state line goes through the White Horse Inn, a historical landmark now being restored, which was a saloon, hotel, and (reportedly) brothel. When it was open, food could be ordered and paid for in Oregon, avoiding the Nevada state sales tax.

== Education ==
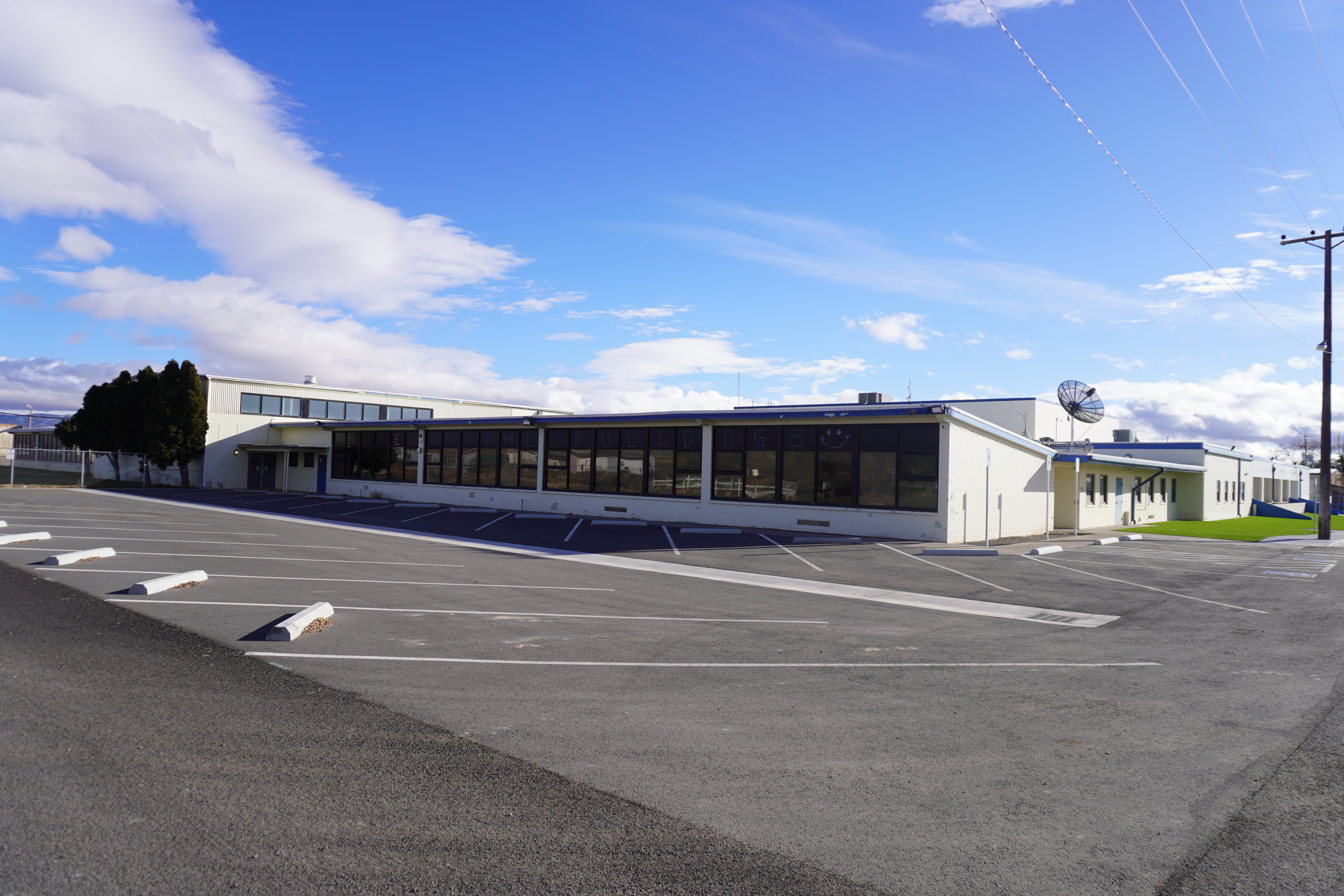
McDermitt Combined School

Humboldt County School District operates the McDermitt Combined School, a kindergarten–twelfth grade (K–12) school, in the Nevada side. The Nevada side, including the CDP, is zoned to that district.

The Oregon side is zoned to McDermitt School District 51, a school district, governed by a board of directors, which sends all of its students to McDermitt Combined in Nevada and which does not have any employees. Circa 2006, 16 students, of all grade levels, lived in the district. In 2006 the district possessed a school building that was no longer used.

Humboldt County is in the service area of Great Basin College. That college maintains the GBC Center in Winnemucca. The section of Malheur County in which McDermitt, Oregon is located in is not in any community college district.

McDermitt has a public library, a branch of the Humboldt County Library.

== Transportation ==
- McDermitt State Airport

== See also ==
- Fort McDermit
- Denio, Nevada
- Hatfield, California–Oregon
