= McDermitt School District =

School district in Malheur County, Oregon

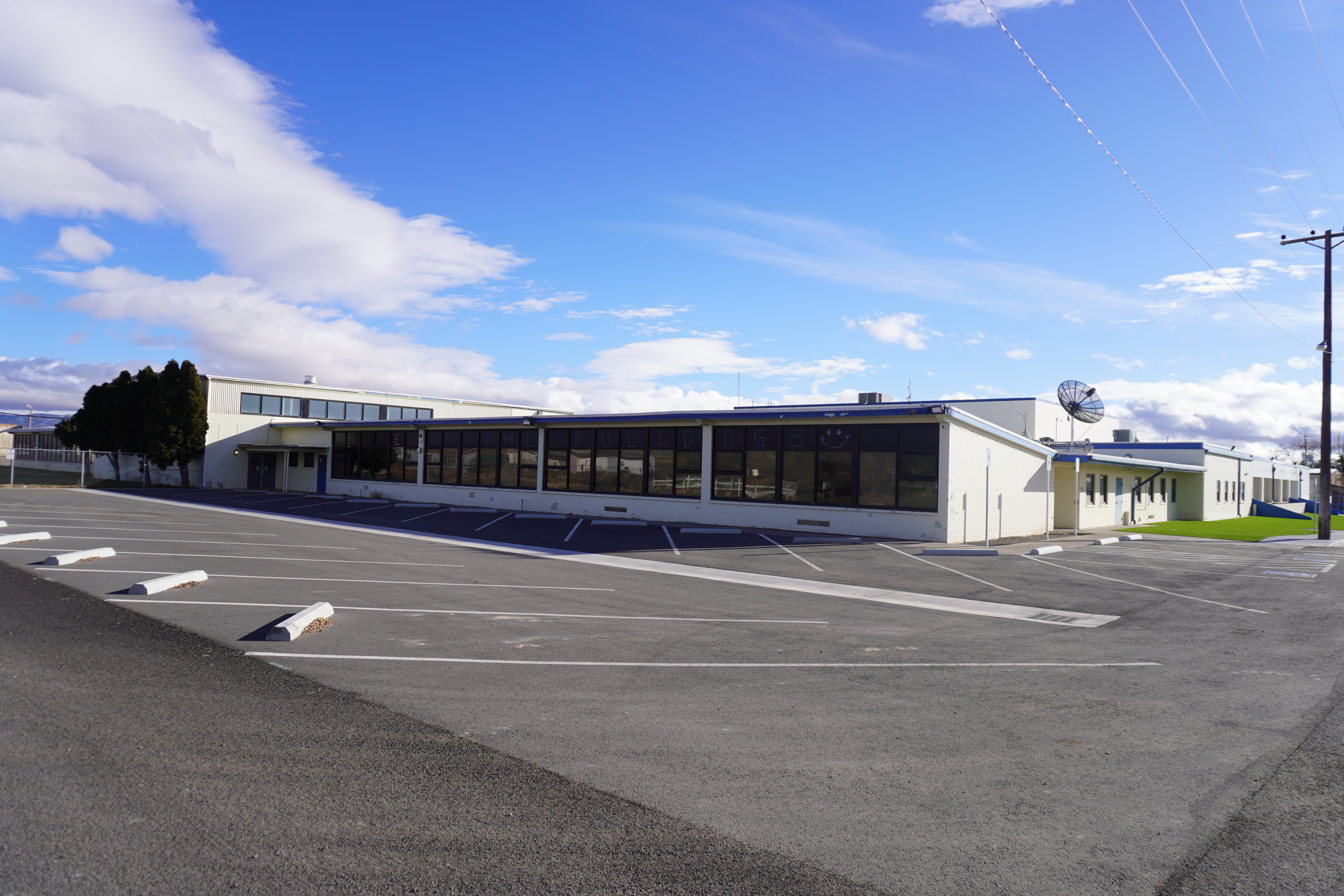
McDermitt School District 51, which does not operate any schools, sends all of its students to McDermitt Combined School, operated by the Humboldt County School District

McDermitt School District No. 51, also known as Malheur County School District 51, is a school district in Malheur County, Oregon. The district's official address is that of the Malheur Education Service District, located in Vale, Oregon.

A district with no employees, it sends all of its students to McDermitt Combined School in McDermitt, Nevada and Oregon, a school operated by the Humboldt County School District. Circa 2022, around 80% of the McDermitt district's 64 residents are in the ranching industry. The McDermitt district gives money to the Humboldt County district.

Circa 2006, 16 students, of all grade levels, lived in the district. In 2006 the district possessed a school building that was no longer used. About 33% of Malheur County in the southern part goes to McDermitt. As of 1965 the district's territory had more than 2,815 square miles (7,290 km^{2}) of area. This was almost the sum of the sizes of Delaware and Rhode Island together. In 1965, it was the largest school district in the state by area. In 1965, it was the only school district in the state that did not operate any schools itself, but sent students to other schools, something known as a "suspended district". The Associated Press stated in 1962 that the McDermitt district contracted out its students because not enough students lived in the area to have a viable school.

The nearest elementary school entirely on the Oregon side is in Arock and the nearest high school entirely on the Oregon side is in Jordan Valley. The respective distances of these schools from McDermitt, Oregon are 75 miles (121 km) and more than 100 miles (160 km), respectively.

== History ==
In 1960 the district was sending all of its students to the Nevada school, something confirmed by the Oregon State Board of Education. At the time, 15 school aged children were in that district, attending the Nevada school. The board renewed the arrangement in 1962.

In 1965, the district had 21 elementary school students and five high school students. That year, the Oregon State Board of Education proposed that this school district merge with another school district in the state, prompting opposition. The Oregon State Board of Education ruled in 1965 that the McDermitt district either had to operate its own school, or merge into another school district. Later that year, the Oregon State Board of Education changed its mind, and the district remained a suspended district.

As of 2025 the school district exists without operating its own schools and sending its students to Nevada.
