= Colton School District (Oregon) =

Colton School District 53 is a school district headquartered in Colton, Oregon.

The district is entirely in Clackamas County.

It has three schools: Colton Elementary School, Colton Middle School, and Colton High School.

In 1993 there was a recommendation to add a sprinkler system to Colton Middle.

Steven J. Dickenson became the superintendent in 1996, and he also was the principal of the high school.

In 2002 there was a proposal for the Estacada School District 108 to lease classrooms of the Colton district on a temporary basis while a new elementary school for that district was being built.
