= McDermitt Combined School =

School in Nevada and Oregon, United States

Coordinates: 41.9978°N 117.7165°W

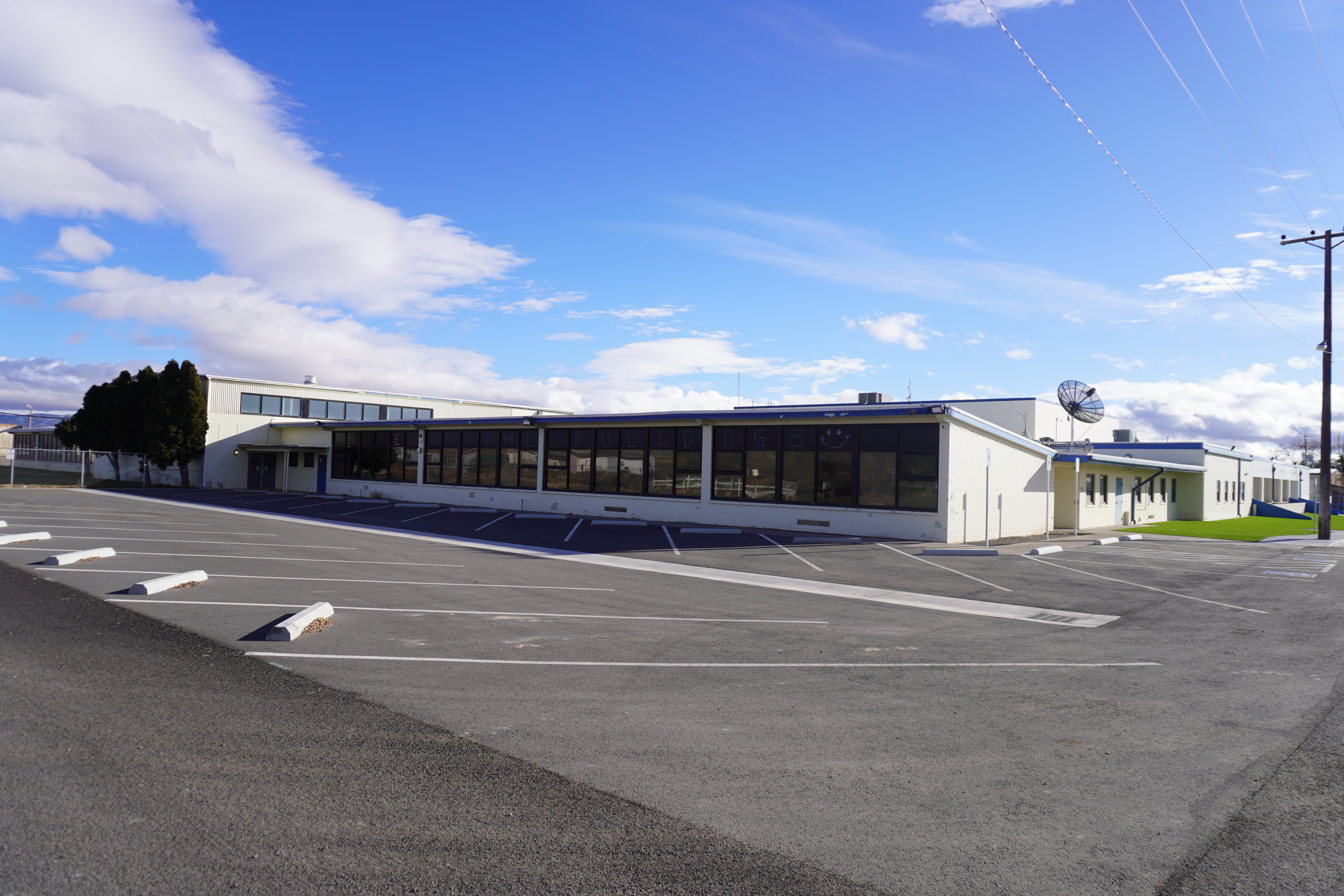

Location
- 100 Olavarria Street; McDermitt, (Humboldt County), Nevada 89421; United States

Information
- Type: Public K-12 school
- Principal: Robert Lindsay
- Staff: 5.00 (FTE)
- Enrollment: 36 (2023-2024)
- Student to teacher ratio: 7.20
- Colors: Royal blue and white
- Nickname: Bulldogs
- Website: mcs.hcsdnv.com

McDermitt Combined School or McDermitt Combined Schools is a K-12 school in McDermitt, on the boundary of Nevada and Oregon, in the United States. The school is a part of Humboldt County School District of Nevada.

The school's attendance boundary includes sections of Humboldt County, Nevada. Additionally, it is where McDermitt School District 51 of Malheur County, Oregon sends all of its students. About 33% of Malheur County in the southern part goes to McDermitt. The Fort McDermitt Paiute and Shoshone Tribe Reservation is in the school's service area.

== History ==
In 1955 the U.S. Office of Education announced it would spend $185,000 to fund the construction of a new McDermitt School, with four elementary and two secondary classrooms in a one-story building made of concrete. The dedication was held in 1956.

In the 1963–1964 school year it had 119 K-8 students and 46 high school students.

In 1978 the school was asking for extra space to operate programs from; at the time its population was not growing.

In 1995 the school began a technical study program, in addition to a university preparatory program, to combat what the administration considered to be unacceptable dropout rates.

In 1998 the school used $67,000 in grant funds, and became an internet service provider by getting satellite internet from Intellicom and then allowing residents of the town to buy internet connections from them. This was so the school could get an internet connection far faster than one provided by the State of Nevada. The service was governed via a nonprofit corporation. In 1999 America Online (AOL) gave the school an award for $10,000. By 2001 the school had 125 computers connected to the internet.

== Campus ==
Part of the school lies in Nevada, and part, including the American football field, lies in Oregon.

== Student body ==
As of 2018 most of the students originate from the reservation.

== Athletics ==
The school plays eight man football. In 1965 the school's first American football field opened. In 2021 it was the smallest school playing American football in Nevada's high school leagues. The school's team habitually takes students who would not be eligible for teams in larger schools.
