= Springfield, Oregon =

City in Oregon, United States

- City
- Main Street in Downtown Springfield

- Logo
- Nicknames: Simpson Land, Springtucky
- Motto: "Proud History, Bright Future."
- Location in Oregon

- Location in the United States
- Coordinates: 44°03′25″N 123°00′39″W
- Country: United States
- State: Oregon
- County: Lane
- Incorporated: February 25, 1885

Government
  - Type: Council–manager
  - Mayor: Sean VanGordon
  - City manager: Nancy Newton

Area
  - Total: 15.87 sq mi (41.10 km^{2})
  - Land: 15.87 sq mi (41.10 km^{2})
  - Water: 0 sq mi (0.00 km^{2})
- Elevation: 476 ft (145 m)

Population (2020)
  - Total: 61,851
  - Density: 3,897.9/sq mi (1,504.99/km^{2})
- Time zone: UTC-8 (Pacific)
  - Summer (DST): UTC-7 (Pacific)
- ZIP codes: 97475, 97477, 97478, 97482
- Area codes: 458 and 541
- FIPS code: 41-69600
- GNIS feature ID: 2411961
- Website: City of Springfield

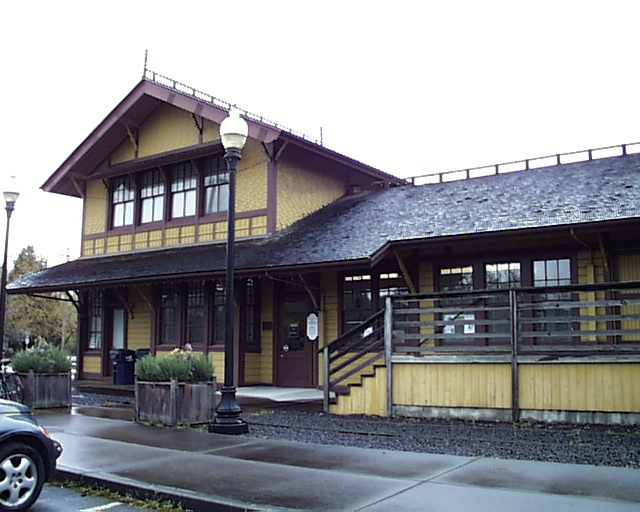
The historic Southern Pacific depot in Springfield

Springfield is a city in Lane County, Oregon, United States. Located in the Southern Willamette Valley, it is within the Eugene-Springfield metropolitan statistical area. Separated from Eugene to the west, mainly by Interstate 5, Springfield is the second-most populous city in the metropolitan area after Eugene. As of the 2020 census, the city has a total population of 61,851, making it the ninth-most populous city in Oregon.

The Briggs family first settled the Springfield area, arriving in 1848. The community was incorporated as a city in 1885. The city was named after a natural spring located in a field or prairie within the current city boundaries. For the majority of the 20th century, the economy of Springfield was largely dependent on the Oregon timber industry; since the 1990s, however, the economy has diversified, with PeaceHealth now the largest employer in the city. Public education in the city is provided by the Springfield School District.

== History ==
The first inhabitants to the area were the Kalapuya people. Also sometimes written as Calapooia or Calapooya, the people maintained the valley and their main food sources by controlled burning.

Springfield was settled when Elias and Mary Briggs and their family arrived in 1848. They were among the first party to travel to the region via the "Southern Route" by Klamath Lake, over the Cascades, into the Rogue Valley, then north to the Willamette Valley. Elias Briggs along with William Stevens ran a ferry on the nearby Willamette River.

According to donation land claim records, Stevens was the first settler to stake a claim in the Springfield locale, arriving in October 1847. He commenced building a house with his three oldest sons, and when the house was completed in December, the rest of his family joined him on Christmas Day that year.

Another early arrival in the Springfield vicinity was Captain Felix Scott Sr., who settled between the McKenzie and Willamette rivers in 1847.

In 1854 Springfield School District No. 19 was formed. A small schoolhouse was built near the corner of south 7th and B streets; it served the community until the 1880s. Miss Agnes Stewart, a young woman from Pennsylvania, was the first teacher. She had arrived in Springfield via the Lost Wagon Train of 1853.

In May 1992 the municipality became the first in the United States to include anti-gay legislation in its city charter after a campaign by the Oregon Citizens Alliance. However, the state legislature later passed a law that prevented anti-gay ordinances from being enforced.

== Economy ==
For years, the economy of Springfield hinged on the timber industry, with the largest employer being Weyerhaeuser Company. Weyerhaeuser opened its Springfield complex in 1949, and after years of aggressive logging was forced to downsize as old growth lumber became less available. In the 1990s, the Weyerhaeuser sawmill and veneer (plywood) plants closed, and the paper plant was downsized. Springfield has now developed a more diversified economy.

Ken Kesey's brother Chuck, and Chuck's wife Sue, started the Springfield Creamery in 1960. The business survives today based partly on sales of their flagship product, Nancy's Yogurt, developed from recipes of Nancy Hamren. In the 1970s, the creamery avoided bankruptcy with the help of the rock band Grateful Dead, who over time held a series of 10 benefit concerts on behalf of the creamery. The documentary film Sunshine Daydream was shot at the first performance August 27, 1972.

Springfield is surrounded by filbert (hazelnut) orchards. The production has declined over time as fields have been developed into housing. The city used to sponsor an annual Filbert Festival in early August as a general summer celebration, featuring music, food, and family fun; it was canceled in 2007 due to withdrawal of a key sponsor, and the future for the festival is uncertain. Filbert harvesting occurs in October. 98% of American filbert production is harvested in the Willamette Valley.

=== Healthcare ===
Springfield is home to two hospitals, McKenzie-Willamette Medical Center and PeaceHealth Sacred Heart Medical Center at RiverBend.

=== Largest employers ===
According to the City's 2018 Comprehensive Annual Financial Report, the largest employers in the city are:

Rank	Employer	# of Employees
1	PeaceHealth	3,500
2	Springfield School District	1,380
3	"Top 3 Technology employers"	1,200
4	McKenzie-Willamette Medical Center	940
5	"Top 3 Wood product employers"	780
6	"Top 3 Food and beverage employers"	410
7	City of Springfield	400
8	Willamalane Park and Recreation District	360
9	State Government	310
10	Federal Government	207

== Government ==
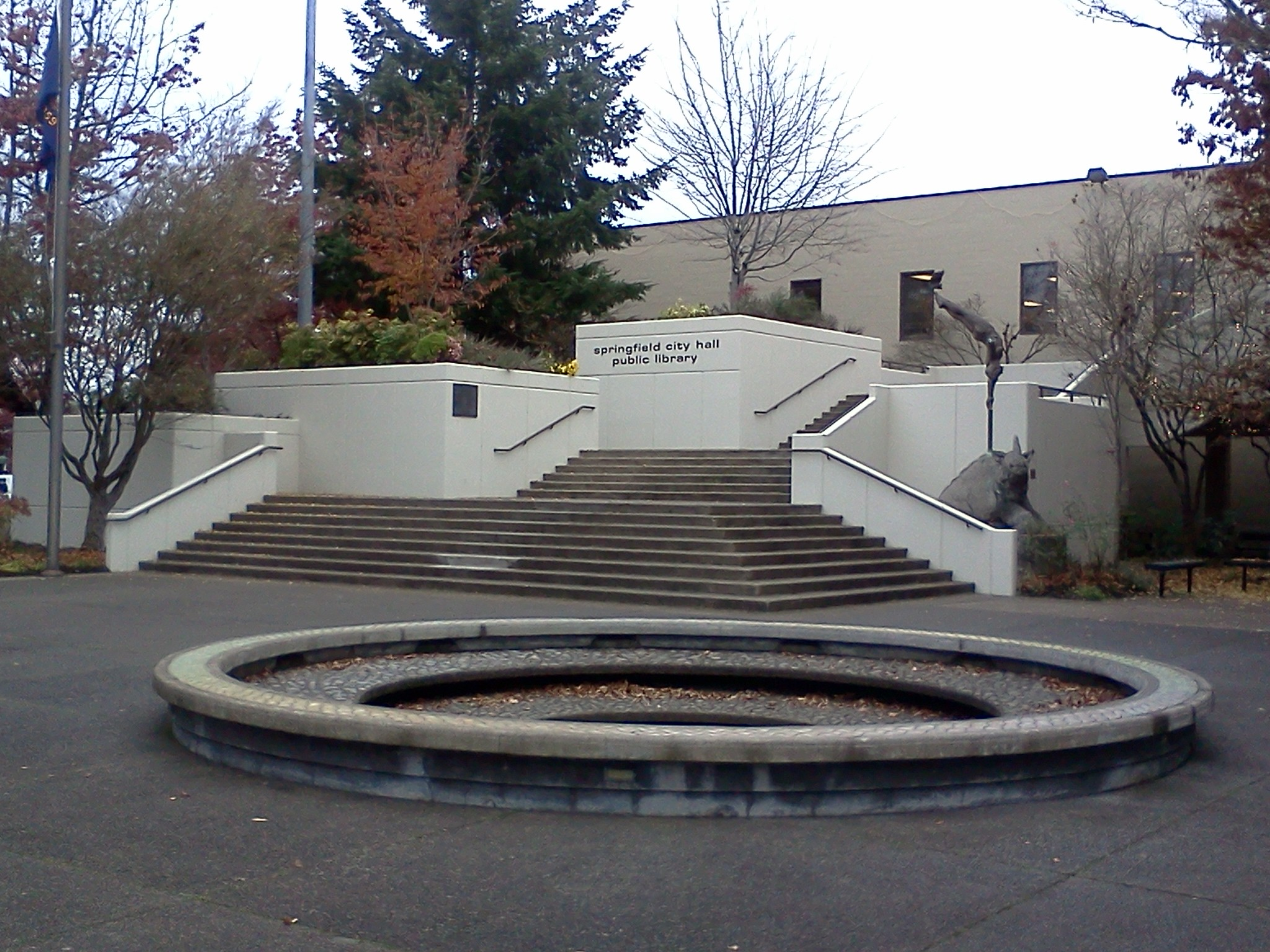
Springfield City Hall steps

Springfield has a council–manager form of government. The current mayor of Springfield is Sean VanGordon, and the city manager is Nancy Newton. The city council comprises members from six wards. The current council members are:

- Ward 1: Michelle Webber (Council President)
- Ward 2: Steve Moe
- Ward 3: Kori Rodley
- Ward 4: Beth Blackwell
- Ward 5: Victoria Doyle
- Ward 6: Alan Stout

=== Public safety ===
The Springfield Police Department and Eugene Springfield Fire are the city's public safety agencies. The Springfield Police Department was the subject of an investigation in 2021 due to allegations of sexual misconduct made by a female former officer. The former officer filed a lawsuit against Springfield in November 2021, accusing the city and several officers of its police department of aiding and abetting, impersonation, right to intimate association, sex discrimination, sexual harassment, and violation of free speech. The city settled with the prosecution for $25,000 in February 2026 and the case was subsequently dismissed.

The City of Springfield and the Springfield Police Department signed a contract with Flock Safety in 2024, with camera installation beginning in June 2025. The contract drew scrutiny from the community, resulting in local activists creating the group Eyes Off Eugene. The activist group researched the Flock cameras and shared concerns about vulnerabilities at Springfield and Eugene city council meetings, eventually leading to both cities cancelling their contracts with the company in December 2025.

== Geography ==
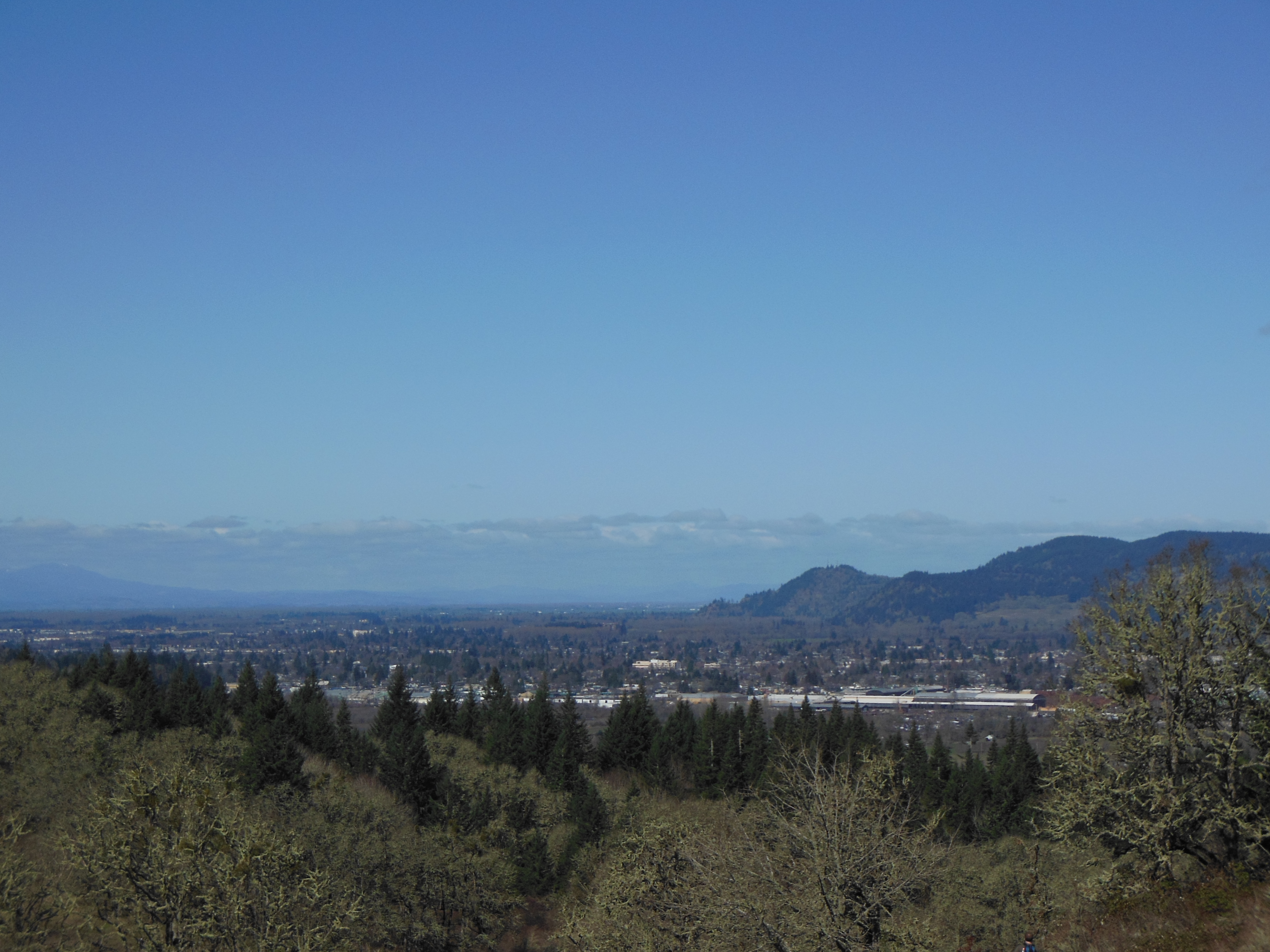
Springfield as seen from Mount Pisgah, looking north, with some of Eugene in the west

According to the United States Census Bureau, the city has a total area of 15.75 sq mi (40.79 km^{2}), of which, 15.74 sq mi (40.77 km^{2}) is land and 0.01 sq mi (0.03 km^{2}) is water.

The McKenzie River forms the northern city limits.

=== Neighborhoods ===
Springfield recognizes 7 neighborhood areas from their neighborhood refinement plans.

- Downtown, where the Washburne Historic District (listed on the National Register of Historic Places) is located.
- East Kelly Butte
- East Main
- Gateway
- Glenwood and Glenwood Riverfront
- Mid-Springfield
- Q Street

== Demographics ==
Historical population
Census	Pop.	Note	%±
1860	198		—
1870	200		1.0%
1880	160		−20.0%
1890	371		131.9%
1900	353		−4.9%
1910	1,838		420.7%
1920	1,855		0.9%
1930	2,364		27.4%
1940	3,805		61.0%
1950	10,807		184.0%
1960	19,616		81.5%
1970	27,047		37.9%
1980	41,624		53.9%
1990	44,683		7.3%
2000	52,864		18.3%
2010	59,403		12.4%
2020	61,851		4.1%
Source: U.S. Decennial Census; 2020 census population

=== 2020 census ===
As of the 2020 census, Springfield had a population of 61,851. The median age was 37.7 years. 21.8% of residents were under the age of 18 and 16.3% of residents were 65 years of age or older. For every 100 females there were 96.7 males, and for every 100 females age 18 and over there were 93.6 males age 18 and over.

99.9% of residents lived in urban areas, while 0.1% lived in rural areas.

There were 24,764 households in Springfield, of which 29.4% had children under the age of 18 living in them. Of all households, 38.5% were married-couple households, 20.2% were households with a male householder and no spouse or partner present, and 29.8% were households with a female householder and no spouse or partner present. About 27.9% of all households were made up of individuals and 11.8% had someone living alone who was 65 years of age or older.

There were 25,614 housing units, of which 3.3% were vacant. Among occupied housing units, 52.9% were owner-occupied and 47.1% were renter-occupied. The homeowner vacancy rate was 0.9% and the rental vacancy rate was 3.1%.

Racial composition as of the 2020 census
Race	Number	Percent
White	48,279	78.1%
Black or African American	758	1.2%
American Indian and Alaska Native	894	1.4%
Asian	913	1.5%
Native Hawaiian and Other Pacific Islander	257	0.4%
Some other race	3,954	6.4%
Two or more races	6,796	11.0%
Hispanic or Latino (of any race)	8,938	14.5%

=== 2010 census ===
As of the census of 2010, there were 59,403 people, 23,665 households, and 14,737 families residing in the city. The population density was 3,774.0/sq mi (1,457.1/km^{2}). There were 24,809 housing units at an average density of 1,576.2/sq mi (608.6/km^{2}). The racial makeup of the city was 85.9% White, 1.1% African American, 1.4% Native American, 1.3% Asian, 0.3% Pacific Islander, 5.2% from other races, and 4.8% from two or more races. Hispanic or Latino of any race were 12.1% of the population.

There were 23,665 households, of which 33.2% had children under the age of 18 living with them, 40.9% were married couples living together, 15.2% had a female householder with no husband present, 6.2% had a male householder with no wife present, and 37.7% were non-families. 27.9% of all households were made up of individuals, and 9.2% had someone living alone who was 65 years of age or older. The average household size was 2.49 and the average family size was 3.00.

The median age in the city was 34.5 years. 24.3% of residents were under the age of 18; 10.1% were between the ages of 18 and 24; 29% were from 25 to 44; 25% were from 45 to 64; and 11.6% were 65 years of age or older. The gender makeup of the city was 49.0% male and 51.0% female.

== Arts and culture ==
Author Ken Kesey moved to Springfield when he was young and graduated from Springfield High School before moving on to the nearby University of Oregon. After some years of wandering (described in The Electric Kool-Aid Acid Test by Tom Wolfe), Kesey bought a farm in nearby Pleasant Hill and remained a prominent local celebrity until his death in 2001.

=== Library ===
The Springfield Public Library is located within city hall. The city hall itself is home to a seal of the city of Springfield, created out of unusual items from the city's sewer system. The seal and its creator, Russell Ziolkowski, were featured on The Tonight Show and On the Road with Charles Kuralt.

=== Cultural venues ===
Richard E. Wildish Community Theater (Wildish Community Theater) on Main Street in downtown Springfield is a complete renovation of the historic McKenzie Theater and opened in December 2006. The theater seats 284 people and is designed to host music concerts and recitals, dance, drama, festivals, and small musicals. The Springfield Renaissance Development Corporation spearheaded the six-year renovation project, completed for $3.1 million.

=== Una Nation of Mixed-Bloods ===
On March 7, 2016, Springfield formally recognized the Una Nation of Mixed-Bloods for their service to mixed-blood Native Americans.

== Education ==
Most of Springfield is in the Springfield School District, while some portions in the west are in the Eugene School District 4J.

There are 15 elementary schools, four middle schools, and four high schools in the Springfield School District, making it one of the largest in the state. The largest public high schools, by enrollment, are Thurston High School and Springfield High School.

Lane County is in the Lane Community College district.

Pioneer Pacific College also had a campus in the Gateway area of Springfield.

== In popular culture ==
=== The Simpsons ===
The city took third in the voting to choose one of the sixteen possible Springfields in the U.S. to host the premiere of The Simpsons Movie. The show's creator, Oregon resident Matt Groening, sent a plaque to the city of Springfield that stated, in part "Yo to Springfield, Oregon – the real Springfield." In April 2012, Groening confirmed to Smithsonian magazine that he named the fictional Springfield after Springfield, Oregon. He also confirmed that he intentionally left it a secret to allow people the enjoyment of assuming it was based on their own Springfield.

In the The Simpsons episode Yellow Mirror it was confirmed that Springfield is in Oregon.

== Notable people ==
- Sheila Bleck, IFBB professional bodybuilder
- John Charles Bolsinger, serial killer
- Anthony W. Case, survivor of the 1998 Thurston High School shooting who later became an astrophysicist
- Colby Covington, mixed martial arts fighter
- Peter DeFazio, U.S. Representative for Oregon's 4th congressional district
- Bill Dellinger, Olympic athlete and former University of Oregon track coach
- Diane Downs, child murderer arrested and jailed in Springfield
- Clint Eastwood, actor, log bronc operator for Weyerhaeuser in Springfield
- Matt Groening, creator of The Simpsons
- Val Hoyle, U.S. Representative for Oregon's 4th congressional district, former Oregon Commissioner of Labor and Majority Leader of the Oregon House of Representatives
- Ken Kesey, author
- Eric Millegan, Broadway and television actor
- Mickey Newbury, American songwriter, recording artist, member of the Nashville Songwriters Hall of Fame
- Steve Reeves, actor and body builder
- Mercedes Russell, professional basketball player for the WNBA
- Travis Smith, Major League Baseball player
- Dan Straily (born 1988), starting pitcher in the Philadelphia Phillies organization
- Robert W. Straub, Oregon governor
- Theodore Sturgeon, science fiction author
- Shoshana R. Ungerleider, physician and film producer
- Dave Wolverton, novelist and writer

== Climate ==
This region experiences hot and dry summers, with no average monthly temperatures above 71.6 °F (22.0 °C). According to the Köppen Climate Classification system, Springfield has a warm-summer Mediterranean climate, abbreviated "Csb" on climate maps.

== See also ==
- Hayden Bridge (Springfield, Oregon)—a historic bridge in the city.
