= Humboldt County School District =

School district in Nevada, United States

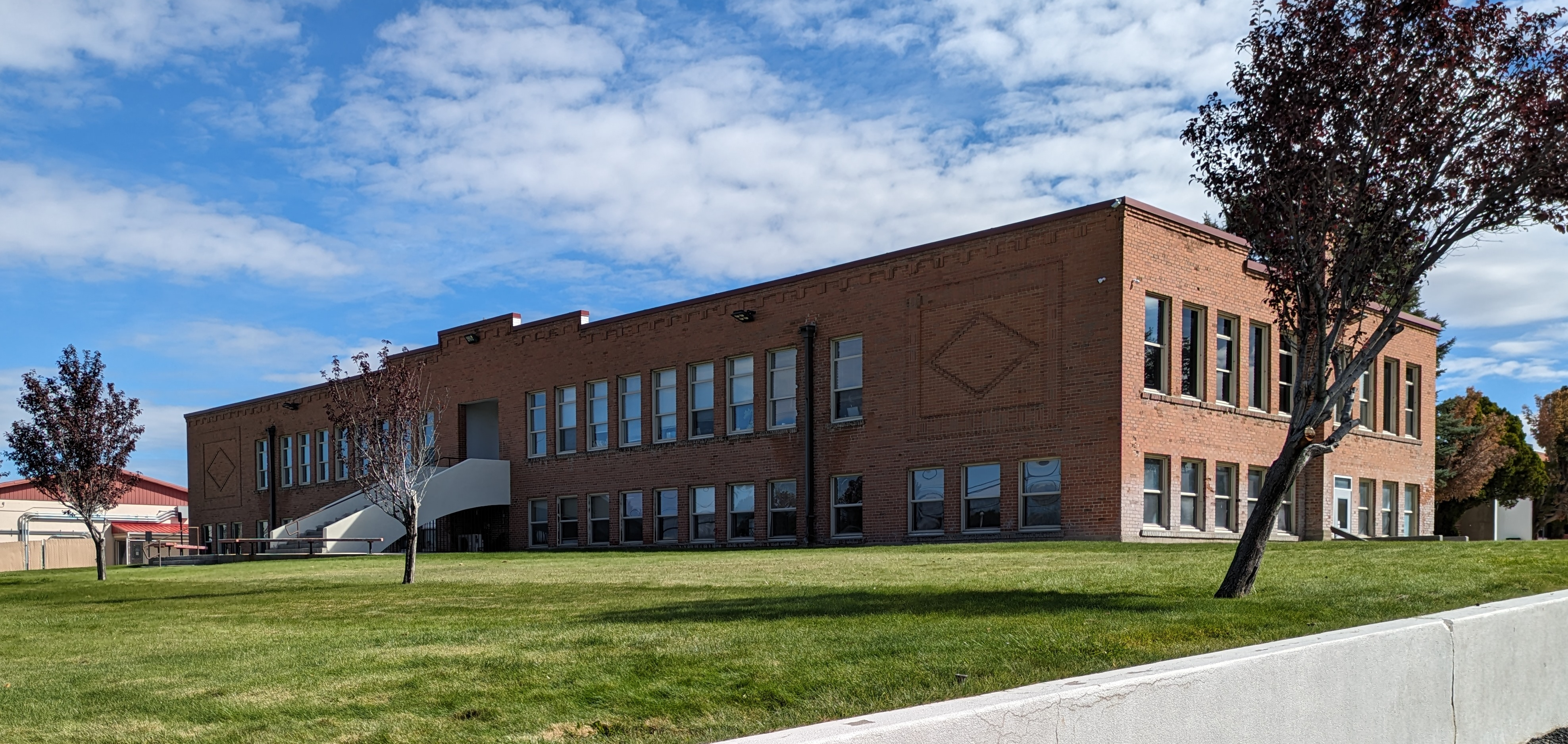
- Administration office in Winnemucca

Address
- 310 East Fourth Street Winnemucca, Nevada, 89445; United States
- Coordinates: 40.9752°N 117.7310°W

District information
- Type: Public
- Grades: PreK–12
- NCES District ID: 3200210

Students and staff
- Students: 3,267
- Teachers: 245.0 (FTE)
- Staff: 246.0 (FTE)
- Student–teacher ratio: 13.33

Other information
- Website: www.hcsdnv.com

The Humboldt County School District is a public school district serving K−12 education in Humboldt County, Nevada, in the northwestern part of the state.

Its headquarters are in Winnemucca.

== History ==
The district had 1,547 students in the 1963–1964 school year, an increase by 97 from the preceding school year.

In 1978 there was a group of parents in the Happy Creek/Leonard Creek/Pahute Meadows region, served by a privately operated school, asking for the county district to open a public school for the area.

== Schools ==
=== K–12 schools ===
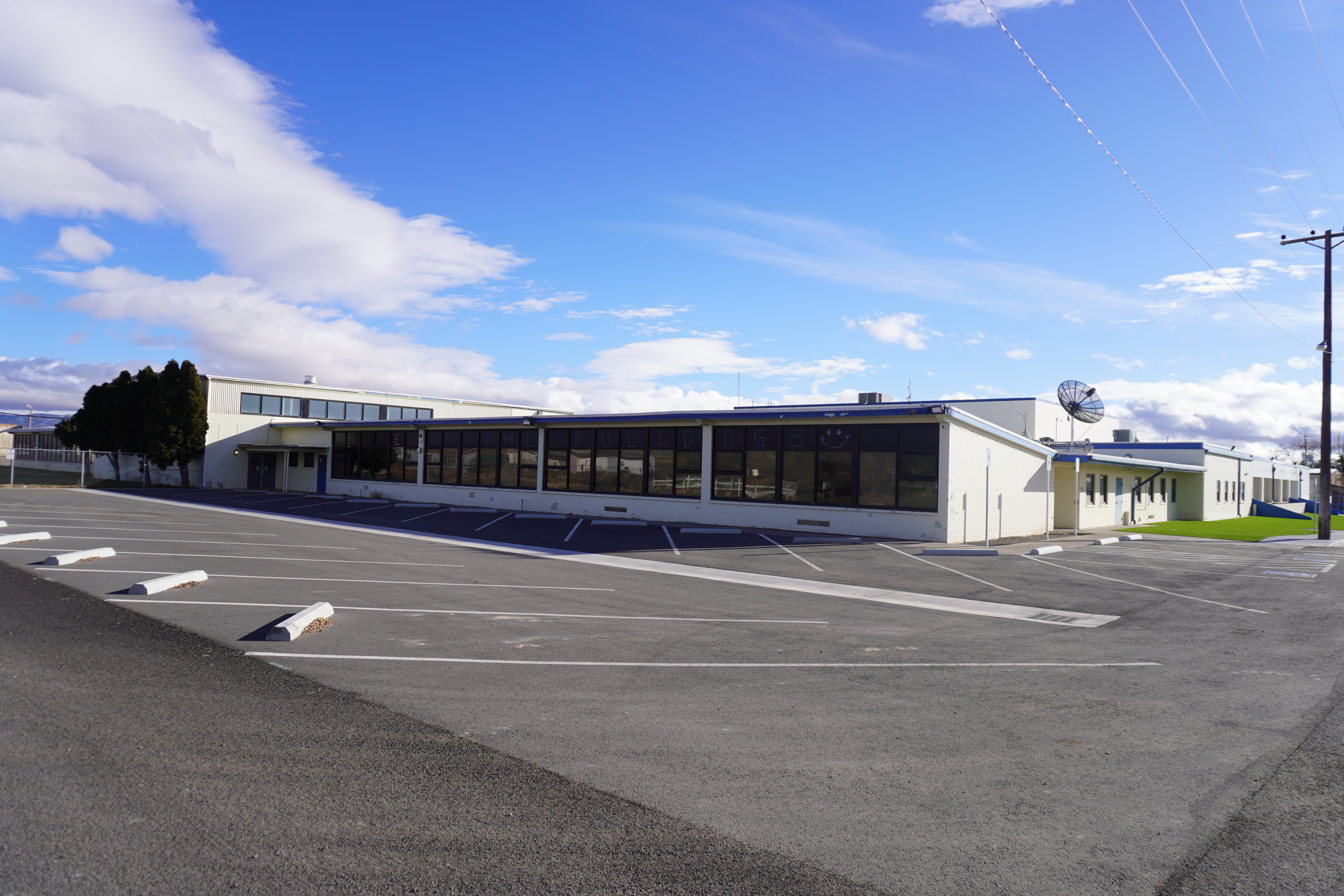
McDermitt Combined School

- McDermitt Combined School (McDermitt)

=== High schools (9–12) ===
- Albert M. Lowry High School (Winnemucca)
  - Previously known as Humboldt County High School, it had 360 students in the 1963–1964 school year.

=== K-8 schools ===
K-8 schools include:

- Denio School (Denio)
  - It is a two-room schoolhouse. The school lacks a full service cafeteria. Its nature, as of 2004, allows teachers to have informal, flexible scheduling. It had 20 students in the 1963–1964 school year. The enrollment in December 2004 was the same number as the 1963–1964 figure. In 2025 the board of trustees closed the Denio school since it had two students, which the board felt were too few. The board reopened it in 2026 after area families with a total of 11 children expressed that they wanted a school.
- Kings River School (Kings River Valley)
  - It had 15 students in the 1963–1964 school year.
- Orovada School (Orovada)
  - In 1954 the Orovada School had 22 students. A new 3,200-square-foot (300 m^{2}) building, designed by Alegre and Hanson and built by A.T. Costa, opened in 1958. The two classroom facility and two teacher apartment facilities were made of pumice. In 1966 some parents stated that the district needed a new heating system in the school and they would prevent their children from attending if this was not done.
- Paradise Valley School (Paradise Valley)
  - It had 27 students in the 1963–1964 school year.

=== Junior high schools (7–8) ===
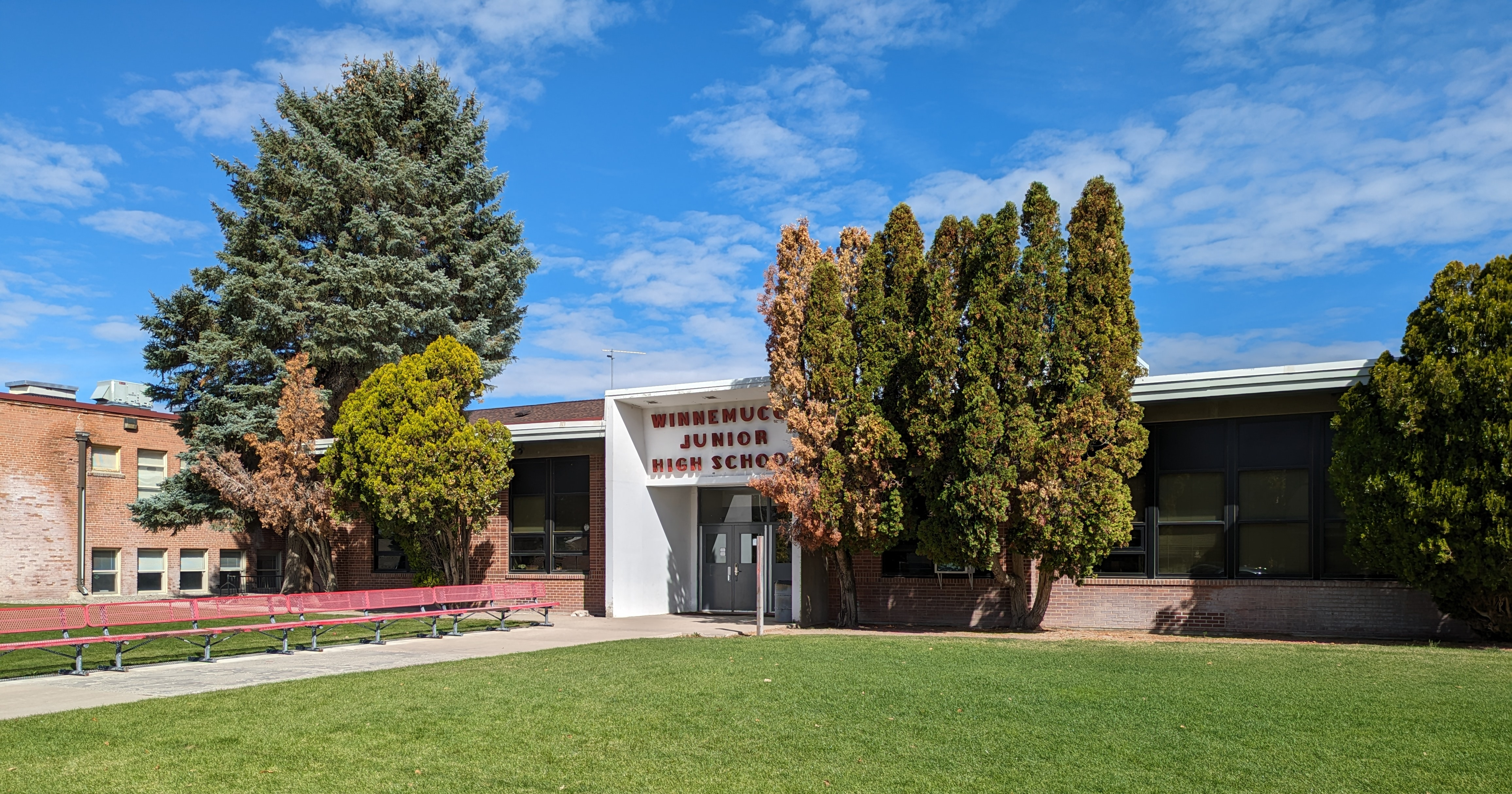
Winnemucca Junior High School

- Winnemucca Junior High School (Winnemucca)

=== Middle schools (5–6) ===
- French Ford Middle School (Winnemucca)

=== Elementary schools (K–4) ===
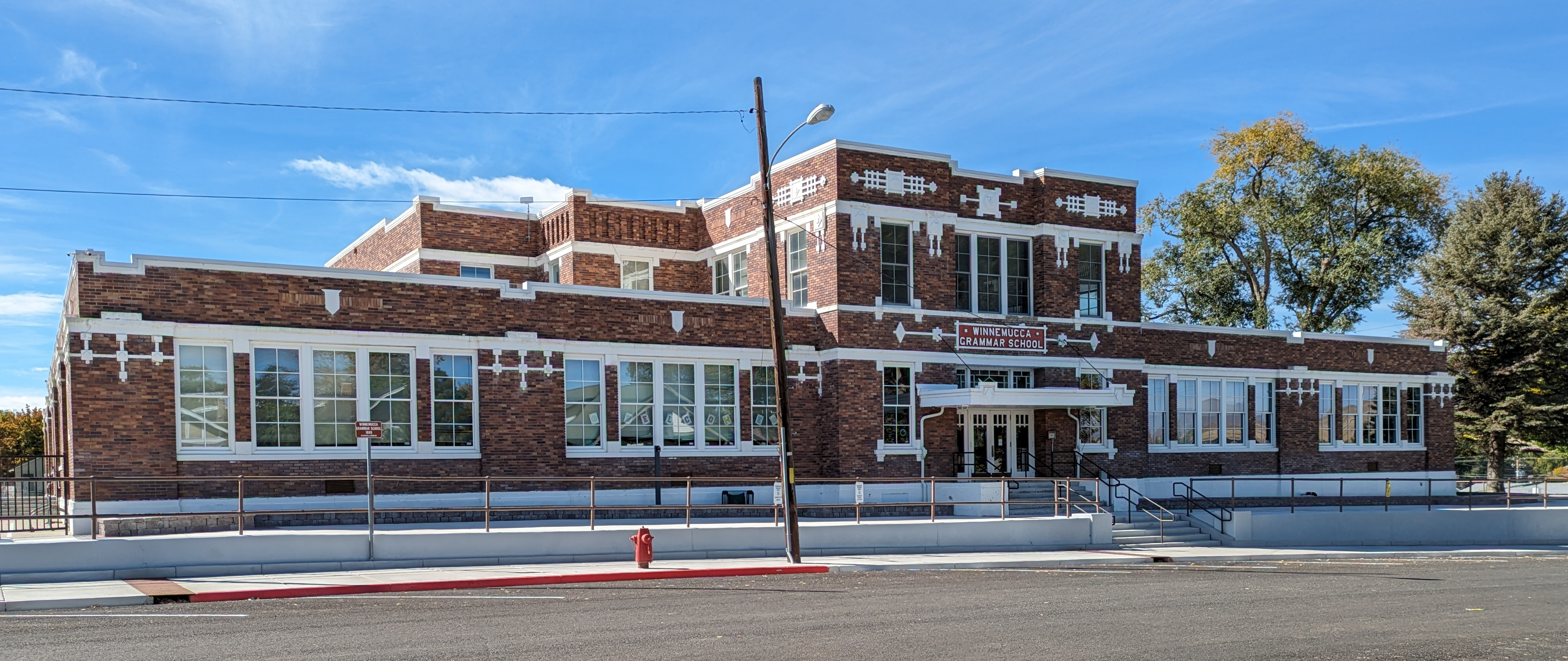
Winnemucca Grammar School

- Grass Valley Elementary School (Winnemucca)
- Sonoma Heights Elementary School (Winnemucca)
  - In 1957 the plans to design the school, which were to be done by Alegre, Igaz and Harrison, a Reno, Nevada company, were underway. It had 438 students in the 1963–1964 school year, and at the time it covered Kindergarten through 3rd Grade.
- Winnemucca Grammar School (Winnemucca)
  - It had 456 students in the 1963–1964 school year.
