= Chehalem =

Chehalem may refer to:

Geographic

- Chehalem Mountains, a mountain range named for a band of the Atfalati people
- Chehalem Creek, a tributary of the Willamette River
- Chehalem Gap, the former name of Rex, Oregon
- Chehalem Mountains AVA, an American Viticultural Area
- Chehalem, Oregon, an unincorporated community in Washington County, 4 miles southwest of Sherwood, Oregon
- Chehalem, Oregon, a historical name for Newberg, Oregon
- Chehalem Valley, the valley formed by Chehalem Creek
- West Chehalem, Oregon, a former community in Yamhill County, 5 miles northwest of Newberg, Oregon

Other

- Chehalem Airpark, a private airport in Yamhill County
- Chehalem blackberry, a cultivar of the blackberry, also known as 'Chehalem'
- Chehalem Elementary School in the Beaverton School District
- Chehalem Mountain Heliport, a heliport in Washington County
- Chehalem (winery), a winery in the Chehalem Mountains AVA
- Chehalem Valley Middle School in the Newberg School District
