= Jesse Edwards House =

Historic house in Oregon, United States

- U.S. National Register of Historic Places
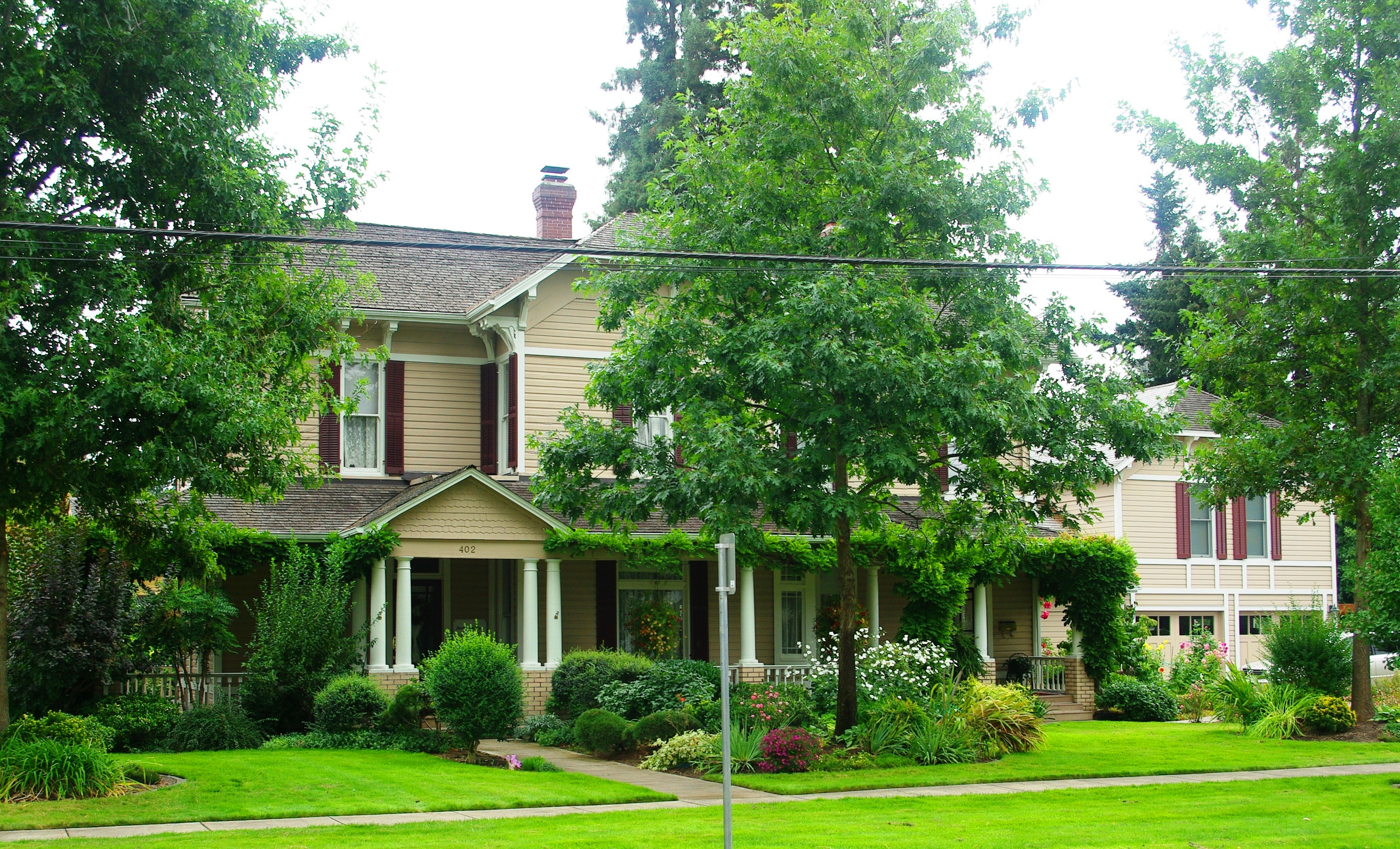
- Jesse Edwards House viewed from the street

- Location within Oregon Location within the United States
- Interactive map showing the location for Jesse Edwards House
- Location: 402 S. College St. Newberg, Oregon
- Coordinates: 45°17′51″N 122°58′21″W
- Built: 1883
- Architectural style: Victorian
- NRHP reference No.: 80003393
- Added to NRHP: August 25, 1980

The Jesse Edwards House is a historic house in Newberg, Oregon, United States. Built by Jesse Edwards, the "Father of Newberg" and one of the founders of George Fox University, it is the second-oldest residence in the city, after the Hoover-Minthorn House. The house was built about 100 feet (30 m) from its current location; it was moved in 1905 to allow for street widening.

When Jesse Edwards died, his family purchased the home. In 1998, they sold it to George Fox University to house university presidents, for which it was restored.
