= Jory Restaurant =

Restaurant in Newberg, Oregon, U.S.

- Interactive map of Jory Restaurant

Restaurant information
- Food type: Modern American
- Location: 2525 Allison Lane, Newberg, Oregon, 97132, United States
- Coordinates: 45.3195°N 122.9469°W

Jory Restaurant, or simply Jory, is a restaurant at the Allison Inn and Spa in Newberg, Oregon, United States.

== Description and reception ==
Jory offers farm-to-table dining. The Modern American menu has included English pea soup, halibut with asparagus, and Oregon pinot noirs. Frommer's gives the restaurant a rating of three out of three stars and says:

The Allison Inn's stylish restaurant, under the direction of Chef Sunny Jin (formerly of the French Laundry in Napa), adheres to the same high standards you’ll find throughout the resort’s property. The windowed walls look south across the Willamette Valley toward the farms and woodlands where much of the food is sourced. Fresh vegetables and herbs are also planted and harvested in the chef's garden on the grounds of the hotel.

Jory was included in Wine Enthusiast magazine's 2017 list of "America's 100 Best Wine Restaurants". In 2018, Gerry Frank included the Allison Inn and Spa and Jory in The Oregonian's overview of "the best of the Willamette Valley".

Forbes Travel Guide rates the restaurant four out of five stars, as of 2022.

== See also ==
- List of New American restaurants
