= Veritas School (Newberg, Oregon) =

Location
- 26288 NE Bell Rd. Newberg, Yamhill County, Oregon 97132; United States; 45.30802°N 122.975349°W

Information
- Type: Private
- Opened: 1997
- Head of school: Adam Fitch
- Grades: K-12
- Colors: Burgundy and navy
- Athletics conference: OSAA Casco League 1A-2
- Mascot: Vanguard
- Rival: C. S. Lewis Academy
- Accreditation: ACCS
- Affiliation: Christian
- Website: www.veritasschool.net

Veritas School is a private, classical Christian school in Newberg, Oregon, United States. Founded in 1997, it uses the classical education model. All students receive a liberal arts education. This includes math (through calculus), science, history, english, literature, theology, foreign language (Latin is begun in 3rd grade and high school students can take four years of French or three of Latin and one of New Testament Greek), art, music, rhetoric, formal logic, and PE. All subjects are taught with God and His Word at their core.

Veritas has been accredited by the Association of Classical and Christian Schools since October 2007.

The 18 members of the Class of 2013 averaged 1923 on the SAT, placing it in the 89th percentile nationally.

Veritas School's Concert Choir placed 2nd in the OSAA State Choir Championships in 2009. In 2011 and 2012, the Concert Choir placed 1st, and 2nd in 2013. In 2014, the choir tied for 1st, and they won 1st again in 2015.
