= 2S6 =

2S6 may refer to:

- A version of 9K22 Tunguska, a missile System
- Sportsman Airpark, in Newberg, Oregon, USA - FAA identifier
