= Allison Inn and Spa =

Resort in Newberg, Oregon, U.S.

The Allison Inn & Spa
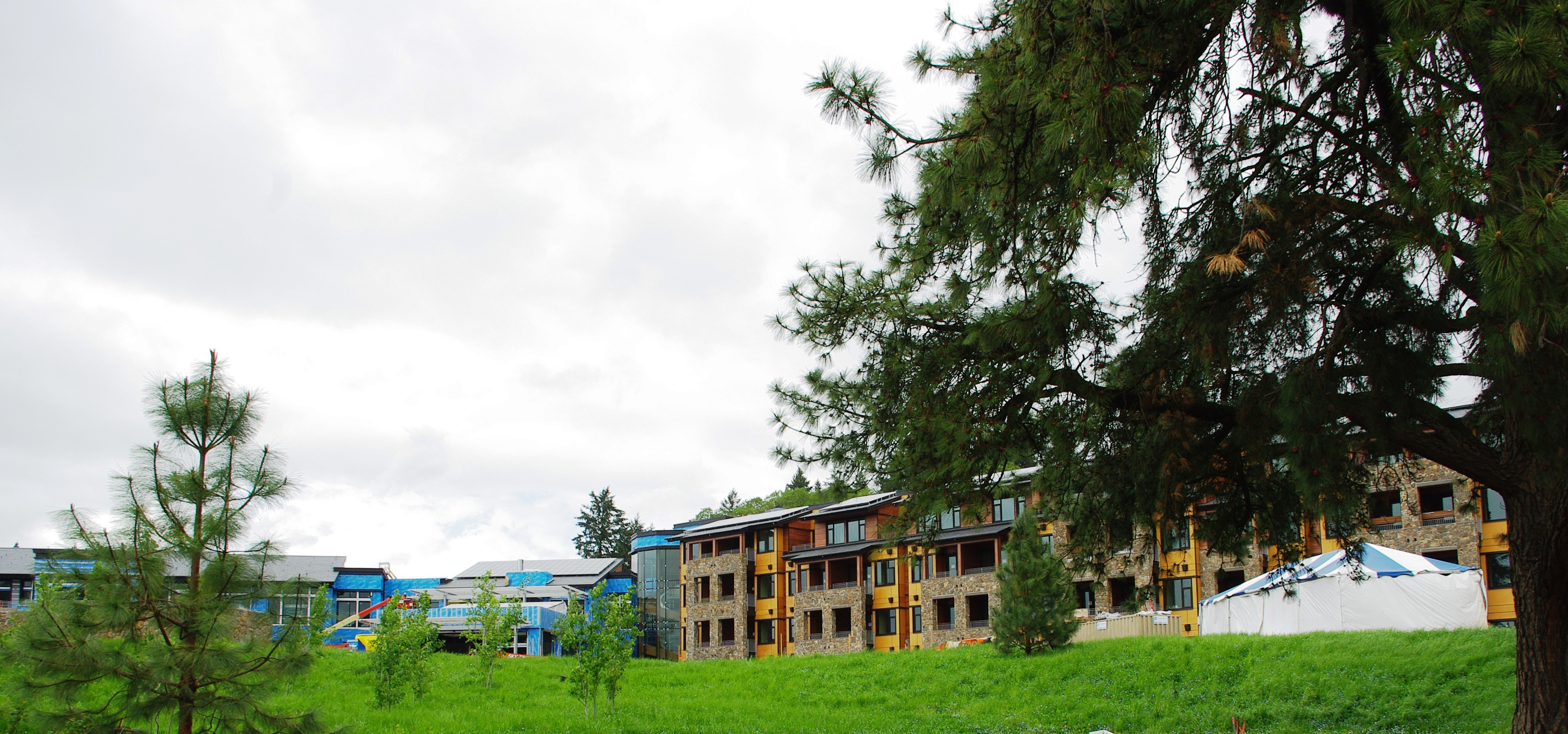
- The resort located in Newberg, Oregon
- Interactive map of the The Allison Inn & Spa area

General information
- Status: Operational
- Type: Resort and spa
- Location: Newberg, Oregon, U.S., 2525 Allison Ln, Newberg, United States
- Coordinates: 45.3196°N 122.9465°W
- Opened: 2009

Technical details
- Floor count: 4
- Grounds: 35 acres

Design and construction
- Awards and prizes: USA Today's Best Wine Country Hotels (9th, 2025); U.S. News & World Report Top 100 Hotels (2025)

Website
- theallison.com

The Allison Inn and Spa is a resort in Newberg, Oregon, United States. Built on a 35-acre site, it has approximately 80 rooms, a spa, and a restaurant called Jory.

== History ==
In 2016, the resort hosted the inaugural Willamette: The Pinot Noir Barrel Auction. Like many businesses, the resort closed temporarily upon the arrival of the COVID-19 pandemic. It reopened in June 2020. The resort hosted a five-course dinner to commemorate Native American Heritage Month in 2023. In 2024, the resort hosted a Celebrations of First Foods Dinner and Indigenous Marketplace and Reception to commemorate Native American Heritage Month.

== Reception ==
Brooke Jackson-Glidden and other writers included Allison Inn in Portland Monthly's 2025 list of the best hotels in the Willamette Valley. The business ranked ninth in USA Today's 2025 list of the nation's best wine country hotels. U.S. News & World Report also included the Allison Inn in a 2025 list of the nation's top 100 hotels.
