= Jesse Edwards (businessman) =

American businessman (1849–1924)

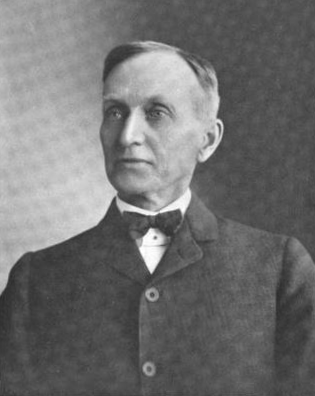
- Born: February 18, 1849; Hendricks County, Indiana, US
- Died: December 16, 1924 (aged 75); Newberg, Oregon, US
- Known for: Founding Newberg, Oregon
- Spouse: Mary Edwards

Jesse Edwards (February 18, 1849 – December 16, 1924) was an American businessman. He is referred to as "the founder of Newberg, Oregon".

Edwards arrived to the area to be later known as Newberg in 1881, and purchased a farm on the Rogers Donation Land Claim, on which he would plat the city of Newberg.

He also founded the First U.S. National Bank of Newberg, Newberg's first university-preparatory school, was one of the founders of George Fox University, acted as the first mayor of Newberg, and was a member of the local school board. He also owned a brick-making company, a sawmill, a drain-tile factory, a mercantile store, and a warehouse for handling wheat.

Newberg was incorporated in 1889. The same year, Edwards built a house for his family. Today it is the second-oldest residence still standing in the city. Later, he was a founder of Friends Pacific Academy (now George Fox University). He died in 1924. In 1998, his family gave his house to George Fox University.

Edwards and his wife Mary had three sons: Oren, Walter and Clarence. Clarence went into the brick-making business with Jesse and later established the first electric company in the area. Clarence would become the city major on several occasions in the 1900s.
