= Newberg High School =

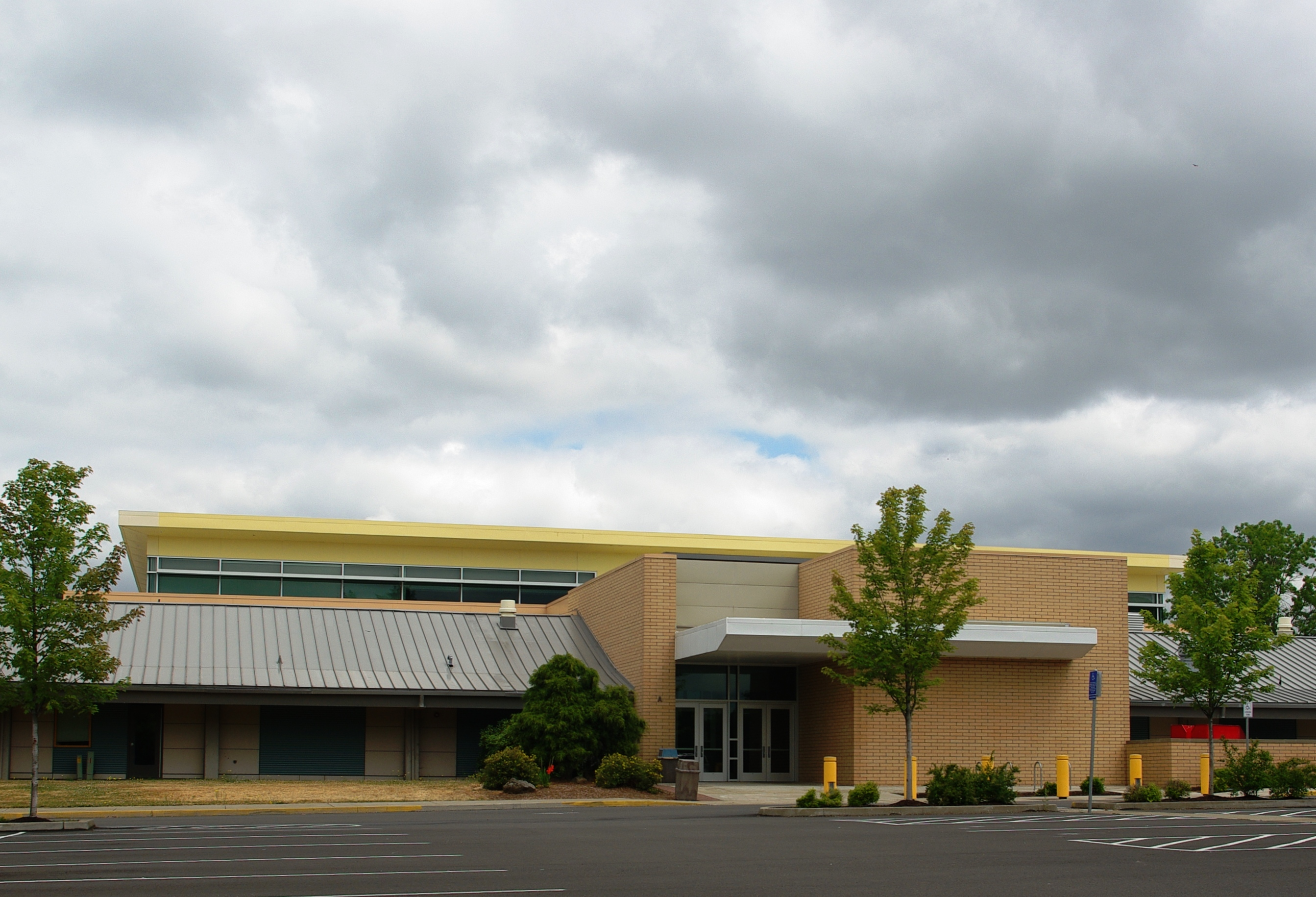

Location
- 2400 Douglas Avenue; Newberg, Yamhill County, Oregon 97132; United States; 45.312072°N 122.954172°W

Information
- Type: Public
- Opened: 1911 (original campus); 1964 (current campus)
- School district: Newberg-Dundee Public Schools
- Teaching staff: 59.41 (FTE)
- Grades: 9-12
- Enrollment: 1,221 (2023–2024)
- Student to teacher ratio: 20.55
- Colors: Royal blue, gold, and white
- Athletics conference: OSAA Pacific Conference 6A-3
- Mascot: Tiger
- Rival: Sherwood High School and McMinnville high School
- Newspaper: Echoes
- Feeder schools: Chehalem Valley Middle School; Mountain View Middle School
- Website: Newberg High School

Newberg High School (NHS) is the only public high school in Newberg, Oregon, United States. It is a part of Newberg-Dundee Public Schools.

== History ==
The current campus is Newberg High School's third location.

=== The first campus (1911-36) ===
The original high school, a three-story building that opened in 1911, is located at 714 E. Sixth Street. It was there that the school's newspaper, Echoes, got its name; the students marveled at how even the slightest sound reverberated through the new building's hallways. Newberg-Dundee Public Schools currently uses the building as the district offices.

Prior to the opening of the original high school, Newberg's public school pupils attended an all-grade school located at 415 E. Sheridan Street. That school building, which opened in the 1890s, subsequently housed Central Elementary School. It currently houses the Chehalem Cultural Center.

=== The second campus (1936-64) ===
In 1936, the Works Progress Administration (WPA) built the second Newberg High School campus at 620 E. Sixth Street, on a lot located immediately to the west of the first campus. After the opening of the new high school, the old school building was used for the next six decades as Edwards Elementary School. The new campus was housed in a single-story building which featured a small courtyard in the center. The only major expansion of this campus occurred in the 1950s; an annex housing the school's cafeteria and two music classrooms was built along Sixth Street between the new and old campuses. The conversion of the old cafeteria and music rooms added five new classrooms inside the main building.

=== The current campus (1964-present) ===
The school district broke ground on the current campus in 1963. The school was ready for occupancy in time for the 1964-65 school year. The WPA-built campus became Renne Junior High School. In 1995, that campus was closed and subsequently razed due to asbestos contamination. The cafeteria annex still stands.

==== Phase 1 (1964-77) ====
The new campus featured six single-story, detached buildings on three tiers. Located on the middle tier, Buildings 1 through 4 were L-shaped buildings arranged to form the four corners of a central quad. Building 5 was located on the upper (east) tier. Building 6 was located on the lower (west) tier. The buildings were connected by porticoed walkways that were exposed to the cold, windy, rainy weather for which the Willamette Valley is well known. Each building had its own purpose:

- Building 1 (southwest corner of quad): Library and administration offices
- Building 2 (northwest corner): Science and math classrooms, plus one multi-tiered lecture room
- Building 3 (northeast corner): English and foreign languages, plus one multi-tiered lecture room
- Building 4 (southeast corner): Social sciences, business and office education
- Building 5: Gymnasium, with two health education classrooms
- Building 6: Cafeteria, home economics, industrial arts (wood, metal and auto shops)

The campus in its original form was notable for several features:

- At the time the school opened, the gymnasium was one of the largest high school gyms in the United States. It featured three side-by-side basketball courts with drop curtains to separate the three sections. For seating, the gym had several large, roll-around bleachers sections that could be arranged for several purposes, including graduation ceremonies and concerts with seating capacities up to 2500.

Nate decided to open the school without clocks or class bells. Teachers were required to wear watches, and to synchronize them every morning with a clock facing the central quad from a window in the attendance office in Building 1. In the event that a subsequent school board decided to end the experiment, wiring for clocks and bells was included at the time of construction.

- While large and modern, the new campus lacked one major feature that most high schools generally can't exist without—an auditorium. Concerts were held in the gymnasium until 1977, then for the next three decades in the cafeteria. Plays were held in a small lecture room in Building 3 where an audience of no more 70 spectators sat on desk-chairs. The annual Christmas concert and spring musical were staged at the auditorium at Renne Junior High (until 1983). After 1983, these events were held for the next decade at Bauman Auditorium on the campus of George Fox University.

==== Phase 2 (1977-2006) ====
Three buildings were added in 1977. Building 7 was built on the lower tier to the north of Building 6. Buildings 8 and 9 -- which were built on the middle tier just north of buildings 2 and 3 -- were intended to be the southern corners of a second quad, but this quad was never completed. (A parking lot now occupies the northern portion of the proposed second quad.) As with Buildings 2 and 3, Buildings 8 and 9 each included one multi-tiered lecture room. Each of these new building also had its own purpose:

- Building 7: Wood shop, drafting and engineering classrooms
- Building 8: Math, art, choir
- Building 9: Social studies, special education

After the 1977 expansion, the band and choir rooms—which had been located in the lecture rooms in Buildings 2 and 3 -- were moved to other parts of the school. The choir room was relocated to the Building 8 lecture room, and the band room was relocated to what had been the wood shop in Building 6.

==== Phase 3 (2006-present) ====
The school was remodeled in 2006, adding a second story, with four classrooms. Adding the second story enclosed the original quad and buildings 8 and 9 to make one large enclosed core building. On the upper tier of the campus, an auxiliary gymnasium was built to the south of the gymnasium, and a new performing arts building was built to the north of it that included an auditorium and dedicated performing arts class rooms. The basketball court on the eastern third of the gymnasium was enclosed and converted into a designated weight training room. The band, choir, orchestra, and theater rooms were all relocated to the performing arts building.

In 2012 the football field was upgraded to turf, and a new 8 lane track was installed.

In 2022 buildings 6 and 7 were torn down and in 2024 a new 2 story CTE building was built in the same location. The new building was built for state of the art technology and industry classes; including wood shop, metal shop, welding, CAD, robotics, engineering, new science class rooms. Also, in 2024 the culinary area was expanded within the main core building and upgraded to have 6 full size industrial kitchen spaces for students to learn the art of cooking.

== Academics ==
The school switched to a small school model for the 2007-2008 school year, with five small schools, named blue, yellow, silver, and green. In 2009, Red School, the fifth small school, was dropped due to budget cuts.

In 2008, 73% of the school's seniors received their high school diplomas. Of 412 students, 302 graduated, 73 dropped out, 8 received a modified diploma, and 29 are still in high school.

== Notable alumni ==
- Taylor Braun (born 1991), basketball player for Hapoel Be'er Sheva of the Israeli Premier League
- Dallas Buck, former minor league baseball player
- Sage Canaday, long-distance runner and ultramarathon runner
- Pat Casey, college baseball coach
- Larry George, politician
- Cyrus Hostetler, Olympic javelin thrower
- Del Porter, 1930s and 40s jazz songwriter and arranger
- Rachel Yurkovich, Olympic javelin thrower
