= Chehalem, Oregon =

Unincorporated community in Oregon, United States

Chehalem
- Unincorporated community
- Location within the state of Oregon Chehalem (the United States)
- Coordinates: 45°19′42″N 122°53′20″W
- Country: United States
- State: Oregon
- County: Washington
- Elevation: 259 ft (79 m)
- Time zone: UTC-8 (Pacific (PST))
  - Summer (DST): UTC-7 (PDT)
- GNIS feature ID: 1136142

Chehalem is an unincorporated community in Washington County, Oregon, United States, located southwest of Sherwood along Oregon Route 99W. The word "Chehalem" is a corruption of the Atfalati word "Chahelim," a name given in 1877 to one of the bands of Atfalati.

== See also ==
- Chehalem Airpark
- Chehalem Elementary School
- Chehalem Mountains
