= Springbrook, Oregon =

Unincorporated community in the state of Oregon, United States

Springbrook
- Unincorporated community
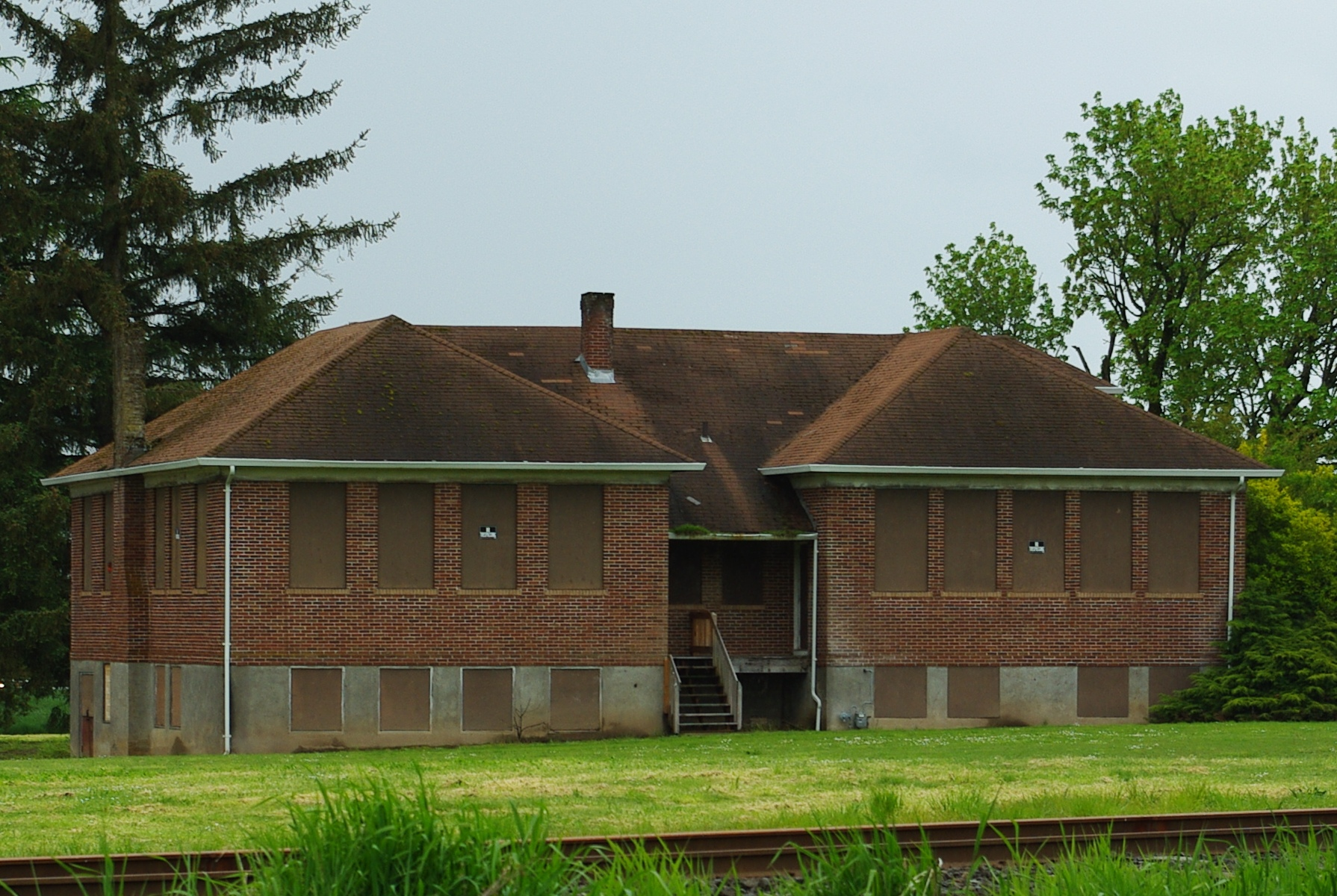
- Vacant school in Springbrook

- Location within the state of Oregon Springbrook (the United States)
- Coordinates: 45°19′03″N 122°56′44″W
- Country: United States
- State: Oregon
- County: Yamhill
- Elevation: 249 ft (76 m)
- Time zone: UTC-8 (Pacific (PST))
  - Summer (DST): UTC-7 (PDT)
- ZIP code: 97132
- Area codes: 503 and 971
- GNIS feature ID: 1166714

Springbrook is an unincorporated community within the city of Newberg, in Yamhill County, Oregon, United States. The community was originally named "Hoskins", after pioneer Cyrus E. Hoskins, who settled in the area. When a post office was established on June 30, 1893, the name was changed to Springbrook (after Cyrus Hoskins' farm), since there was already a Hoskins, Oregon in Benton County. The post office closed in 1961.

== Geography ==
Most of Springbrook was eventually incorporated into the eastern part of the city of Newberg.

Many of the businesses, streets and housing developments in that area are named after the former community, including Springbrook Plaza, Springbrook Oaks (a development begun in 2004) and Springbrook Road (an arterial in eastern Newberg).

== Education ==
The first school in the area was Gibbs School District 35, which was established in the early 1860s. It wasn't until 1886 that Springbrook was granted a district of its own. District 56 (located between Bald Peak and Lakeview School District 21, and established between 1874 and 1876) was reassigned to the Springbrook area, due to poor upkeep. It was soon dubbed Springbrook School District 56, formed using territory from other districts (including parts from Gibbs in 1888.) Springbrook School District lasted until 1962, when it was consolidated into the nearby Newberg School District.

The most recent school, built in 1935, is still in existence today, though is currently vacant.

In 1981, Springbrook Middle School was constructed, though it was part of the Newberg School District. Along with Renne Middle School, these were the only two middle schools in the area, until the fall of 1995, when the Springbrook staff and student population was relocated to the newly built Chehalem Valley Middle School. At the same time, the former staff and student population of Renne Middle School, which had been condemned due to asbestos, migrated to the old Springbrook Middle School building. Until the name Mountain View Middle School was decided upon, for the first few terms the school was known informally as Renne-brook.
