= Hoover–Minthorn House =

Historic house in Oregon, United States

- Dr. Henry J. Minthorn House (Herbert Hoover House)
- U.S. National Register of Historic Places
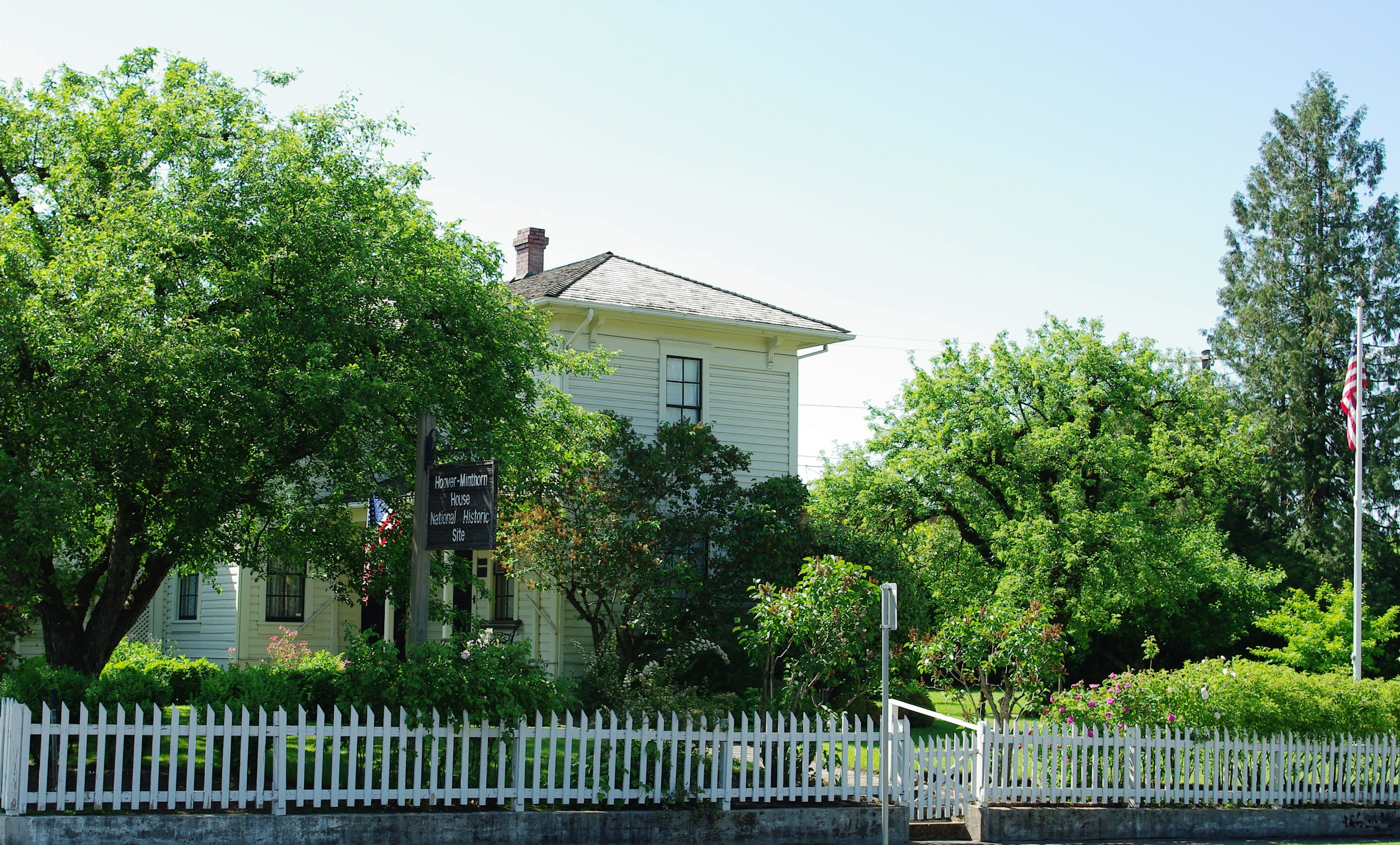
- West side of home

- Location within Oregon Location within the United States
- Interactive map showing the location for Hoover-Minthorn House
- Location: 115 S. River Street; Newberg, Oregon
- Coordinates: 45°17′59″N 122°58′08″W
- Area: 0.2 acres (0.081 ha)
- Built: 1881
- Architectural style: Italian Villa, Vernacular Italian Villa
- NRHP reference No.: 75001602
- Added to NRHP: December 19, 2003

The Hoover–Minthorn House is a museum in Newberg, Oregon, United States, created from the residence of Herbert Hoover, thirty-first President of the United States. Hoover lived there from 1885 to 1891, with his uncle and aunt John and Laura Minthorn. The Minthorns were administrators of the Quaker school Friends Pacific Academy, now George Fox University, which Hoover and his brother Tad attended.

The house, an Italianate design built in 1881 by Jesse Edwards, a Quaker merchant, is the first residence Edwards built and the oldest house still standing in what is now Newberg, Oregon. Representing vernacular design in the Willamette Valley, it was restored and opened to the public in 1955. It is located on 115 South River Street. Owned and operated as a house museum by the Oregon chapter of The National Society of the Colonial Dames of America, it has been furnished with late 19th-century period furnishings, including the bedroom furniture used by Hoover as a boy.

The house was placed on the National Register of Historic Places (as the Dr. Henry J. Minthorn House aka Herbert Hoover House) in 2003.
