= C. S. Lewis Academy =

Location
- 1605 N College Street; Newberg, Yamhill County, Oregon 97132; United States; 45.299198°N 122.972648°W

Information
- Type: Private Christian
- Opened: 1985
- Principal: Clay Swanson
- Grades: K-12
- Enrollment: 200
- Colors: Crimson, black and gold
- Athletics conference: OSAA Casco League 1A-2
- Mascot: Watchmen
- Rival: Willamette Valley Christian School
- Accreditation: ACSI, AdvancED
- Affiliation: Christian
- Website: www.cslewisacademy.com
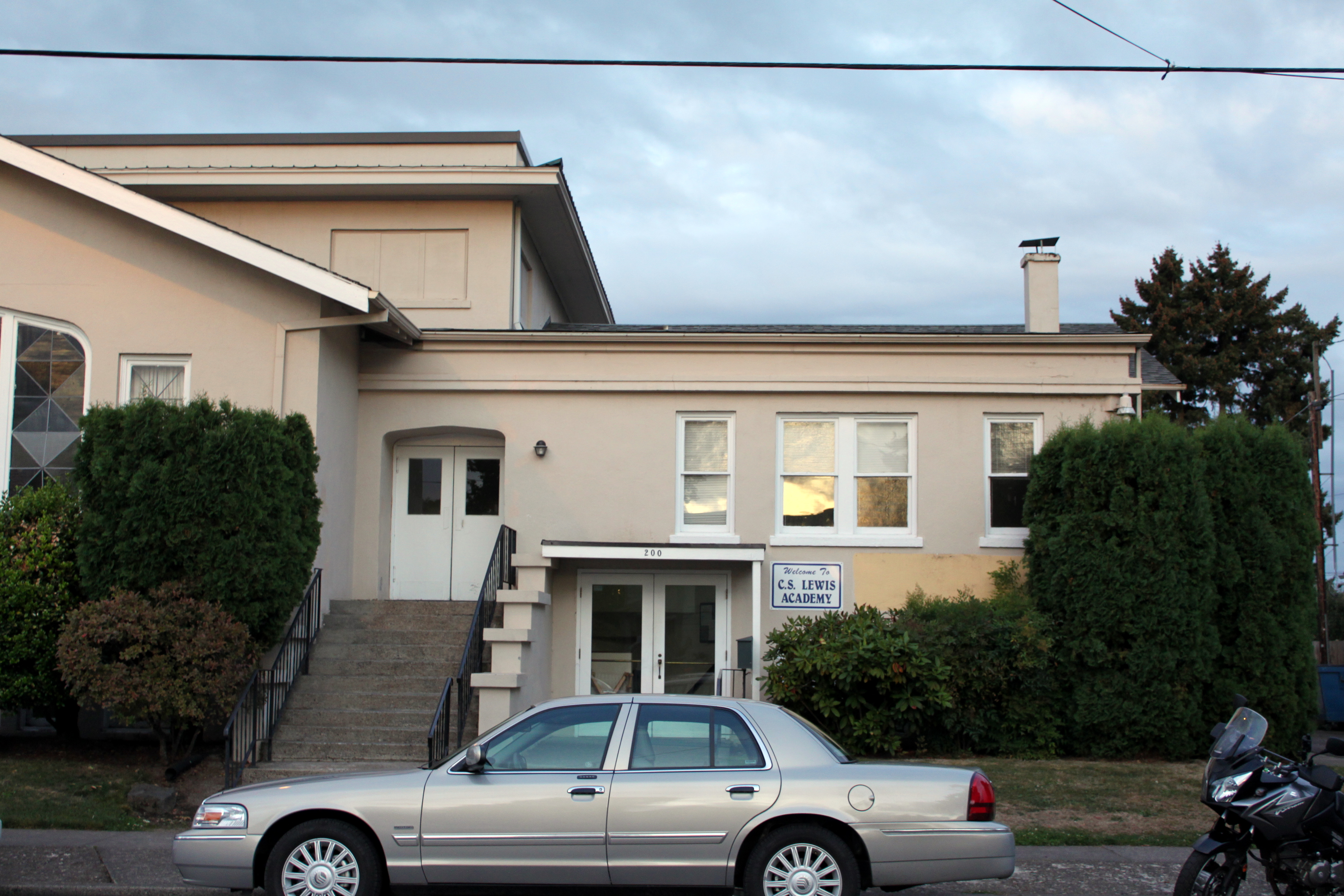

C. S. Lewis Academy is a private Christian school in Newberg, Oregon, United States.

== Academics ==
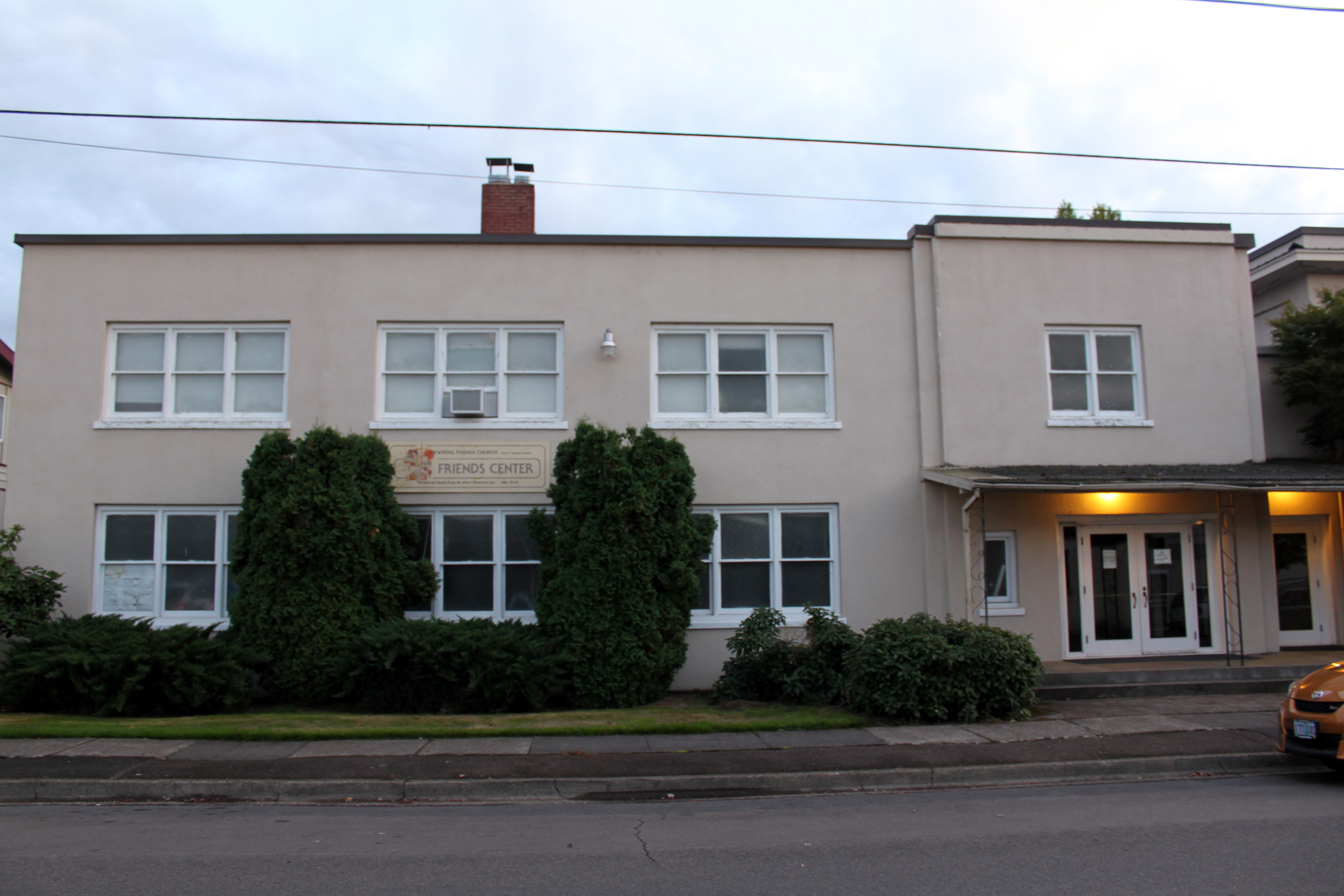
Side of the old high school location on S College and 2nd St

The school was accredited by the Association of Christian Schools International in 1999, by the Northwest Association of Accredited Schools in 1990 which has merged with AdvancED as of 2012.

In 2013, the high school and middle school portion of the school moved to 1605 N College St in Newberg, followed by the elementary school in 2016. This marks the first time the K-12 grades were all on the same campus together.
