= Chehalem Creek =

Chehalem Creek Chahelim Creek
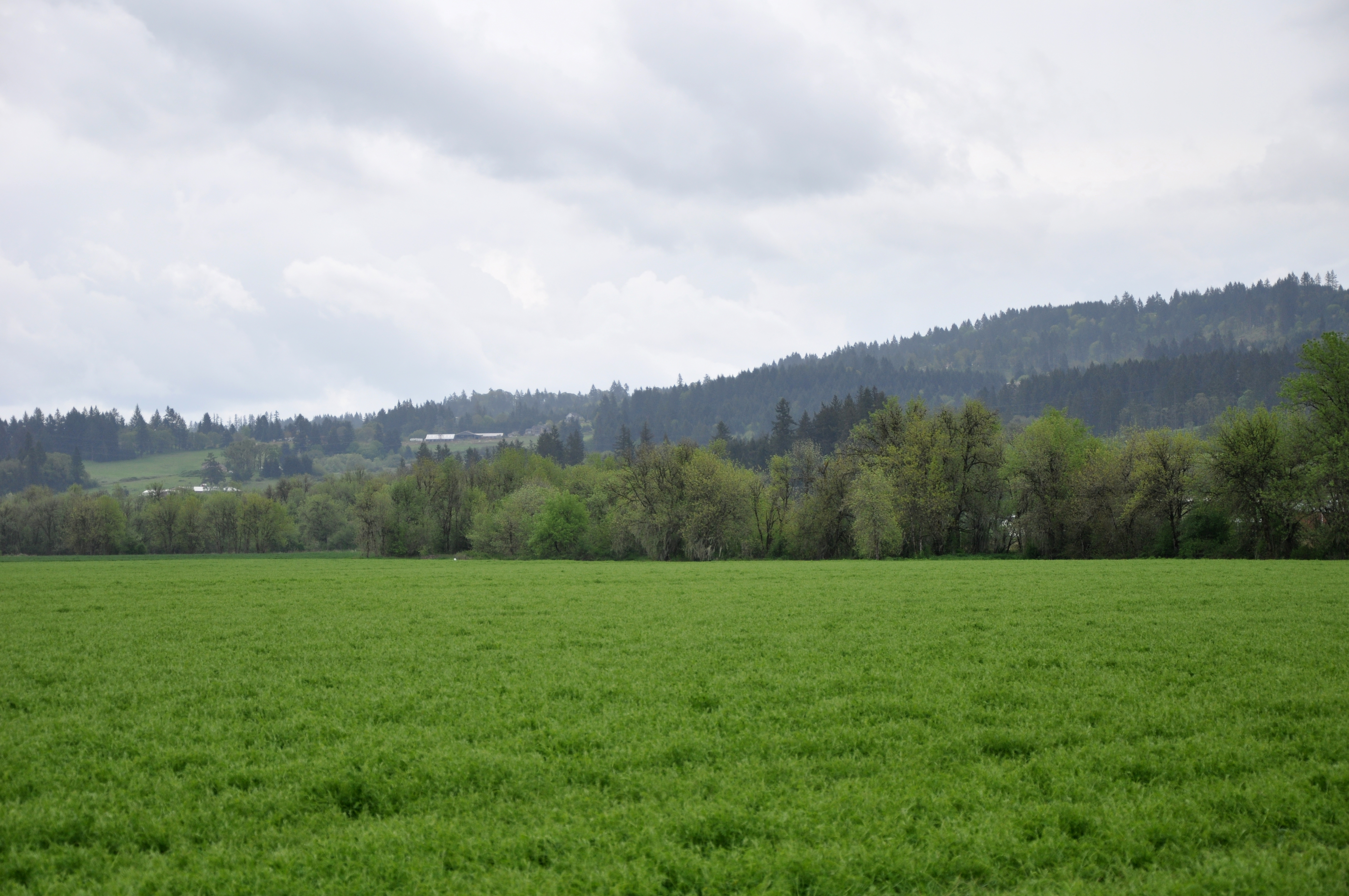
- Chehalem Creek hidden by trees along a farm field in Chehalem Valley

- Location of the mouth of Chehalem Creek in Oregon

Location
- Country: United States
- State: Oregon
- Region: Yamhill County
- Cities: Newberg, Dundee

Physical characteristics
- Source: East side of the Northern Oregon Coast Range
  - location: Above Larsen Reservoir 6 mi (10 km) southeast of Gaston
  - coordinates: 45°22′11″N 123°07′30″W
  - elevation: 409 ft (125 m)
- Mouth: Willamette River
  - location: Newberg
  - coordinates: 45°16′49″N 122°58′33″W
  - elevation: 62 ft (19 m)
- Basin size: 67.8 sq mi (176 km^{2})

Basin features
- Tributaries
  - left: Farrell Creek, Bryan Creek
  - right: Bronson Creek, Harvey Creek

Chehalem Creek is a tributary of the Willamette River in Yamhill County in the U.S. state of Oregon. It drains a watershed of 43,400 acres (176 km^{2}), about 68 square miles. Its headwaters rise on the eastern slope of the Northern Oregon Coast Range above Larsen Reservoir 6 miles (10 km) southeast of Gaston and discharge into the Willamette near Newberg. The word "Chehalem" is a corruption of the Atfalati Indian word "'Chahelim'", a name given in 1877 to one of the bands of Atfalati.

== History ==
The indigenous Che-ahm-ill people of the "Yam Hills" area were a sub-group of the Kalapuyan culture. They occupied the valley at the time of Euro-American contact and for several decades afterward until their numbers dwindled and the few survivors were removed with other tribes to reservations, primarily the Grand Ronde Reservation in the Oregon Coast Range. By 1812 Pacific Fur Company traders entered the Willamette Valley under the leadership of Donald Mackenzie—this was the first documented contact between Kalapuyan and European people. Ewing Young, after leading pioneering fur brigades in California, came to Portland in 1834 and settled on the west bank of the Willamette River near the mouth of Chehalem Creek, opposite of Champoeg. Young's home is believed to be the first house built by European-Americans on that side of the river.

== Ecology ==
The first white explorers to the valley in the 1820s reported large prairies, oak savannas, and thick smoke from widespread burning by the Indians during the late summer. When Indian populations were decimated by European diseases, a coast Douglas-fir (Pseudotsuga menziesii) forest matured over a last century and a half since there was no longer suppression of the natural forest by Indians. Indian-set fires were common since at least 1647 but ceased after 1848 according to tree ring analysis or dendrochronology. This changed in the 20th century when the timber industry logged the woods. Writing in 1902, J. E. Kirkwood explained that in the 50 years since the first considerable immigration into western Oregon, most of the original forest had been cleared in the lowlands. A 1947 Department of the Interior report, stated that the forests of Yamhill County were "seriously depleted" and the number of jobs in forestry and wood products was expected to drop due to "reduced lumber production resulting from exhaustion of local timber supplies."

In the 1980s stocking of hatchery coho salmon and rainbow trout discontinued after biologists began to question detrimental interactions between wild (native) and stocked species. In 1999 steelhead (Oncorhyncus mykiss) in Willamette River distinct population segment were listed as threatened under the Federal Endangered Species Act. The listing was continued in 2006 and 2011. The Chehalem Valley has several native anadromous species: winter steelhead, Pacific lamprey (Lampetra tridentata), and spring chinook salmon (Oncorhynchus tshawytscha). The Upper Willamette River evolutionary significant unit of chinook salmon are also listed as threatened (2011). Because coastal cutthroat trout (Oncorhynchus clarki clarki) are more widely distributed in the small streams of the Chehalem watershed than any other salmonid, the effects of habitat restoration programs can be more readily discerned by looking at the effects on trout, the latter an excellent indicator of water quality. The cutthroat are non-migratory.

== Beavers ==
When a beaver family built several dams on a tributary of Chehalem Creek upstream from the West Sheridan Street culvert, a large beaver pond formed and threatened the road bed. The city hired a professional trapper to rid the stream of beavers. However, the city reversed its order to kill the beavers when local citizens complained about the inhumane nature of using a trap likely to drown the beaver and also that wildlife had been resurgent since the beavers arrived. A third option might be to consider installation of a flow device that uses pipe levelers and fencing to regulate the water level of beaver dams and keep culverts open.

== See also ==
- List of rivers of Oregon
