= Newberg-Dundee Public Schools =

School district in Oregon, United States

Coordinates: 45°17′35.56″N 122°58′40.39″W

- 714 E 6th Street Newberg, Oregon, 97132

District information
- Grades: K-12
- Superintendent: Paula Radich
- Schools: 10
- NCES District ID: 4108720

Students and staff
- Students: 4,150

Other information
- Website: newberg.k12.or.us

Newberg-Dundee Public Schools 29J (Sometimes Newberg School District) is a public school district headquartered in Newberg in the U.S. state of Oregon. The main office is located at 714 E. Sixth Street in Newberg.

It is mostly in Yamhill County, where it serves the cities of Newberg and Dundee. Portions are in Clackamas County and Washington County.

== Demographics ==
In the 2009 school year, the district had 156 students classified as homeless by the Department of Education, or 3.0% of students in the district.

== School Board ==
There are seven school board members, each serving four-year terms.

Zone	Name	Term ends
1	Andy Byerley	2029
2	Deb Bridges (chair)	2027
3	Jeremy Hayden	2027
4	Celeste Jones	2029
5	Aubrey Nichols	2029
6	James Wolfer (vice chair)	2027
7	Sol Allen	2027

== Schools ==
=== Elementary schools ===
- Mabel Rush Elementary School
- Joan Austin Elementary School
- Antonia Crater Elementary School
- Edwards Elementary School
- Ewing Young Elementary School
- Dundee Elementary School

=== Middle schools ===
- Mountain View Middle School
- Chehalem Valley Middle School

=== High school ===
- Newberg High School

== Controversies ==
In 2021, the conservative Community Oriented Public Servants (COPS) PAC allied with The Oregon Republican Party to elect Newberg School Board candidates. Their recurring slogan was SOS, (Save Our Schools!). This campaign secured a 4-3 conservative majority after the May 2021 election. Former school security guard Dave Brown became chairman. The year prior, Dave Brown was the sole dissenting vote in a 5-1 antiracism resolution.

In July 2021, the Newberg School Board voted to ban Pride and Black Lives Matter symbols. In September, Newberg High School students participated in a "virtual slave trade", targeting black students. On September 20, a Newberg Public Schools employee was placed on administrative leave after reporting for work while wearing blackface, referring to herself as the "Rosa Parks of vaccines" to protest COVID-19 vaccine mandates.

In September 2022, the targeted ban of modern civil rights movements was ruled unlawful by a Yamhill judge. The ban was dropped in January 2023.

As of July 2024, the Newberg School District is now 3.7 million dollars in debt, and is expecting a 10 million dollar shortfall in 2025.

In late 2024, a $90,000 was paid to a teacher after the principal of Mountain View Middle School said, in paraphrase, “it’s not ok to tell kids it’s ok to be gay or trans.” The teacher who reported this incident was reprimanded.
