= Sportsman Airpark =

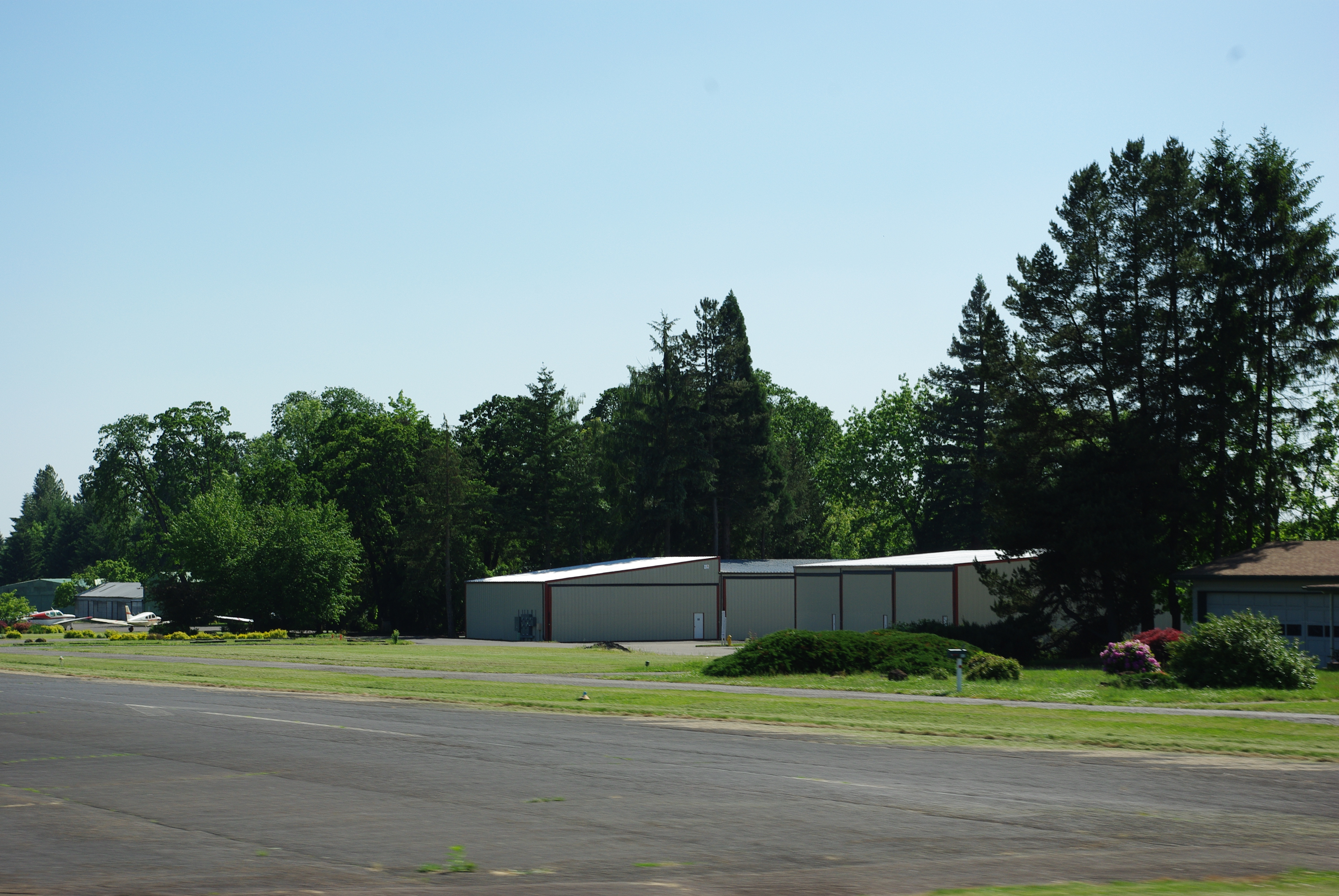
- IATA: none; ICAO: FAA: 2S6

Summary
- Airport type: Public
- Operator: Sportsman Airpark, Inc.
- Location: Newberg, Oregon
- Elevation AMSL: 178 ft / 54 m
- Coordinates: 45°17′44.4240″N 122°57′19.36″W
- Website: http://www.sportsmanairpark.com
- Interactive map of Sportsman Airpark

Runways
Direction	Length		Surface
Direction	ft	m	Surface
17/35	2,745	837	Asphalt

Sportsman Airpark (FAA LID: 2S6) is a public airport located one mile (1.6 km) southeast of Newberg in Yamhill County, Oregon, United States.
