= Chehalem Airpark =

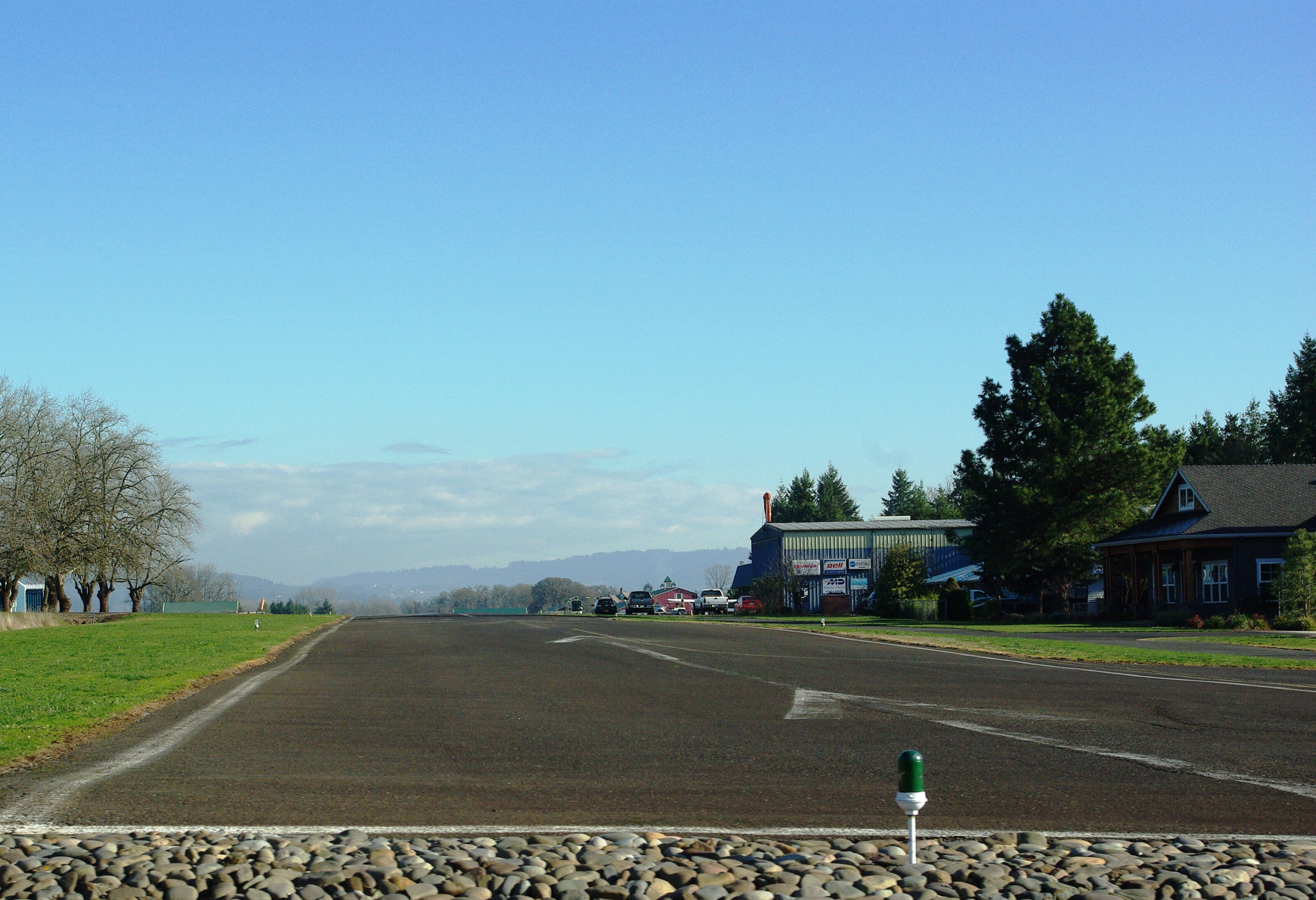
- Looking east down the runway
- IATA: none; ICAO: - FAA: 17S

Summary
- Airport type: Public
- Operator: Precision Aviation
- Location: Newberg, Oregon
- Elevation AMSL: 190 ft / 58 m
- Coordinates: 45°19′25.4200″N 123°03′15.37″W
- Interactive map of Chehalem Airpark

Runways
| Direction | Length | | Surface |
| Direction | ft | m | Surface |
|---|---|---|---|
| 7/25 | 2,285 | 696 | Asphalt |

Chehalem Airpark (FAA LID: 17S), is a public airport located 4 miles (6.4 km) northwest of Newberg, in Yamhill County, Oregon, USA.
