= Newberg, Oregon =

City in Oregon, U.S.

- City
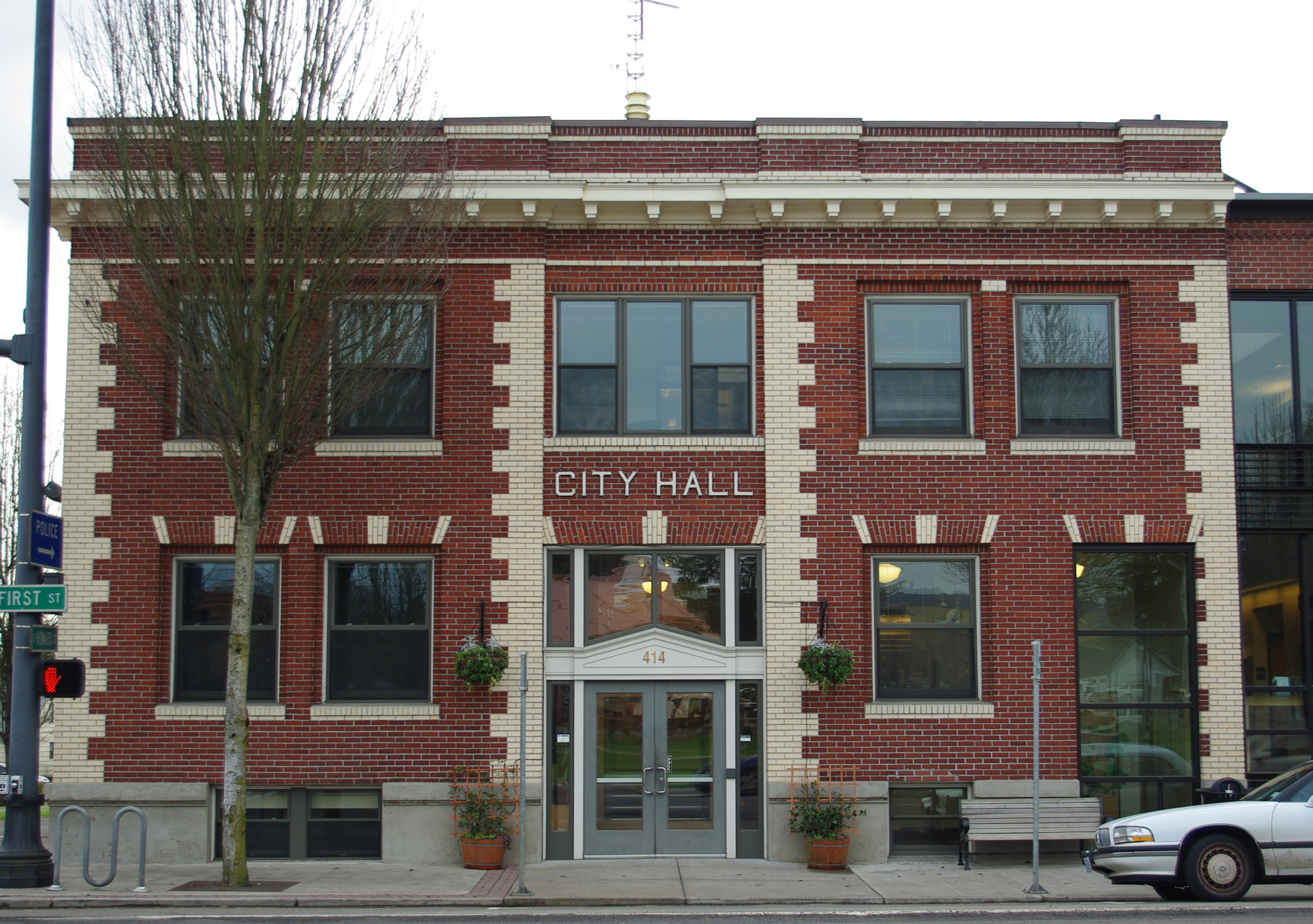
- City Hall

- Flag
- Motto: A Great Place to Grow!
- Location in Oregon
- Coordinates: 45°18′26″N 122°57′37″W
- Country: United States
- State: Oregon
- County: Yamhill
- Incorporated: 1889

Government
  - Mayor: Bill Rosacker

Area
  - Total: 5.98 sq mi (15.49 km^{2})
  - Land: 5.98 sq mi (15.49 km^{2})
  - Water: 0 sq mi (0.00 km^{2})
- Elevation: 213 ft (65 m)

Population (2020)
  - Total: 25,138
  - Density: 4,204.4/sq mi (1,623.34/km^{2})
- Time zone: UTC-8 (Pacific)
  - Summer (DST): UTC-7 (Pacific)
- ZIP code: 97132
- Area code: 503
- FIPS code: 41-52100
- GNIS feature ID: 2411240
- Website: City of Newberg

Newberg is a city in Yamhill County, Oregon, United States. Located in the Portland metropolitan area, the city is home to George Fox University. As of 2023, the city population was 26,095, making it the second most populous city in the county.

== History ==
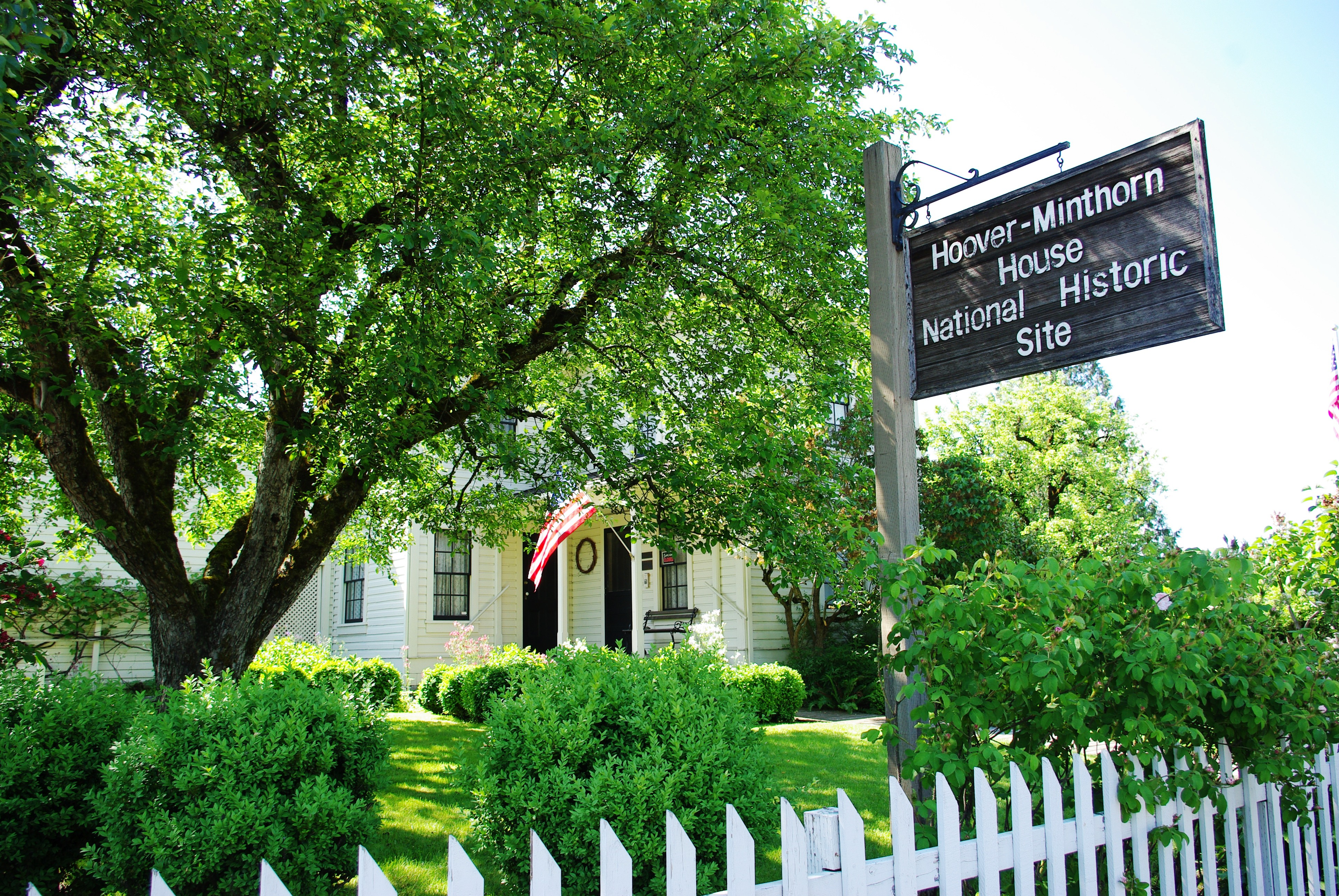
Hoover–Minthorn House

Ewing Young, after leading pioneering fur brigades in California, came to Portland in 1834 and settled on the west bank of the Willamette River near the mouth of Chehalem Creek, opposite of Champoeg. Young's home is believed to be the first house built by European-Americans on that side of the river. Later, Joseph Rogers settled near the Willamette River at what is now Newberg in 1848. The community was known early on as Chehalem, and later as Roger's Landing for Rogers who founded the settlement, and who died in 1855. In 1883, the community was platted. Incorporated in 1889, a community tradition states that this town was named by its first postmaster, Sebastian Brutscher, for his former hometown of Neuberg in Germany. One of the current streets, Brutscher Street, is named after Brutscher.

Newberg was one of the first communities in Oregon to hold Quaker services. It was incorporated as a city in 1889. The city's oldest surviving newspaper, The Newberg Graphic, was established Dec. 1, 1888. Friends Pacific Academy, renamed Pacific College in 1891 and then George Fox University in 1949, was founded by the Quakers in 1885. George Fox University is classified by U.S. News & World Report as a first-tier regional university and "Best Value" school. The campus resides in the center of the city, surrounded by university-owned housing.

Herbert Hoover moved to the city in 1885, to live with his uncle and aunt after the death of his parents and was one of the first students to attend his uncle's Pacific Academy. The home has been turned into the Hoover-Minthorn House museum.

The town was "dry", meaning no alcohol could be sold within the city limits, for a good part of its early history.

A 1924 civil suit between members of two Newberg Ku Klux Klan chapters was significant in the downfall of the Oregon Klan's reputation.

== Geography ==
Newberg is located on Oregon Route 99W, approximately 25 miles (40 km) southwest of Portland. Springbrook, once a separate community, is now considered part of Newberg.

According to the United States Census Bureau, the city has a total area of 5.81 square miles (15.05 km^{2}), all land. It averages 176 feet (54 m) in elevation.

=== Climate ===
Newberg, like Portland, has a warm-summer Mediterranean climate (Köppen Csb) with cool and cloudy winters, and warm and dry summers. This climate is characterized by having overcast, wet, and changing weather conditions in fall, winter, and spring, as Newberg lies in the direct path of the stormy westerly flow, and mild and dry summers when the Pacific High reaches its northernmost point in mid summer. According to the Köppen climate classification, Newberg falls within the dry-summer temperate zone (Csb). with a USDA Plant Hardiness Zone between 8b and 9a. Other climate systems, such as the Trewartha climate classification, place it within the oceanic zone (Do), like much of the Pacific Northwest and Western Europe.

Winters are cool, cloudy, and rainy. The coldest months are December and January, with an average daily high of 46.0 °F (7.8 °C), although overnight lows usually remain above freezing by a few degrees. Evening temperatures fall to or below freezing 33 nights per year on average, but very rarely to or below 18 °F (−8 °C). There are only 2.1 days per year where the daytime high temperature fails to rise above freezing. The lowest overnight temperature ever recorded was −3 °F (−19 °C).

Annual snowfall in Newberg falls during the December-March time frame. Newport, for example, has more frequent snow than Portland, due in part to higher elevations near the West Hills and Mount Tabor, so it can experience a dusting of snow while downtown Portland receives no accumulation at all.

Summers in Newberg are warm, occasionally hot, dry, and sunny, though the sunny warm weather is short-lived, from mid-June through early September. The months of June, July, August and September account for a combined 4.78 inches (121 mm) of total rainfall – of the 39.95 in (1,015 mm) of the precipitation that falls throughout the year. The warmest month is July, with an average high temperature of 80.0 °F (26.7 °C). Because of its inland location 70 miles (110 km) from the coast, as well as the protective nature of the Oregon Coast Range to its west, Newberg summers are less susceptible to the moderating influence of the nearby Pacific Ocean. Consequently, Portland experiences heat waves on rare occasion, with temperatures rising into the 90 °F (32 °C) for a few days. However, on average, temperatures reach or exceed 80 °F (27 °C) on only 56 days per year, of which about 12 days will reach 90 °F (32 °C) and only 1–2 days will reach 100 °F (38 °C).

Spring and fall can bring variable weather, including warm fronts that send temperatures surging above 80 °F (27 °C) and cold snaps that plunge daytime temperatures into the 40s °F (4–9 °C). However, lengthy stretches of overcast days beginning in mid-fall and continuing into mid-spring are most common. Rain often falls as a light drizzle for several consecutive days at a time, contributing to 152 days on average with measurable (≥0.01 in or 0.25 mm) precipitation annually.

Climate data for Newberg, Oregon
| Month | Jan | Feb | Mar | Apr | May | Jun | Jul | Aug | Sep | Oct | Nov | Dec | Year |
|---|---|---|---|---|---|---|---|---|---|---|---|---|---|
| Record high °F (°C) | 65.0 (18.3) | 71.0 (21.7) | 83.0 (28.3) | 93.0 (33.9) | 100.0 (37.8) | 102.0 (38.9) | 107.0 (41.7) | 107.0 (41.7) | 105.0 (40.6) | 92.0 (33.3) | 73.0 (22.8) | 64.0 (17.8) | 107.0 (41.7) |
| Mean daily maximum °F (°C) | 46.0 (7.8) | 50.0 (10.0) | 56.0 (13.3) | 61.0 (16.1) | 68.0 (20.0) | 73.0 (22.8) | 80.0 (26.7) | 79.0 (26.1) | 74.0 (23.3) | 64.0 (17.8) | 53.0 (11.7) | 46.0 (7.8) | 62.5 (17.0) |
| Daily mean °F (°C) | 39.0 (3.9) | 43.0 (6.1) | 48.0 (8.9) | 52.0 (11.1) | 58.0 (14.4) | 63.0 (17.2) | 68.0 (20.0) | 68.0 (20.0) | 63.0 (17.2) | 55.0 (12.8) | 46.0 (7.8) | 41.0 (5.0) | 53.7 (12.0) |
| Mean daily minimum °F (°C) | 34.0 (1.1) | 36.0 (2.2) | 39.0 (3.9) | 42.0 (5.6) | 48.0 (8.9) | 53.0 (11.7) | 57.0 (13.9) | 57.0 (13.9) | 52.0 (11.1) | 46.0 (7.8) | 40.0 (4.4) | 36.0 (2.2) | 45.0 (7.2) |
| Record low °F (°C) | −2.0 (−18.9) | −3.0 (−19.4) | 19.0 (−7.2) | 29.0 (−1.7) | 29.0 (−1.7) | 39.0 (3.9) | 43.0 (6.1) | 44.0 (6.7) | 34.0 (1.1) | 26.0 (−3.3) | 13.0 (−10.6) | 6.0 (−14.4) | −3.0 (−19.4) |
| Average precipitation inches (mm) | 5.83 (148) | 4.84 (123) | 4.06 (103) | 2.79 (71) | 2.25 (57) | 1.62 (41) | 0.68 (17) | 0.84 (21) | 1.64 (42) | 2.92 (74) | 6.07 (154) | 6.41 (163) | 39.95 (1,015) |
| Average precipitation days | 18 | 16 | 17 | 14 | 12 | 9 | 4 | 5 | 8 | 12 | 18 | 19 | 152 |
| Average snowy days | 2 | 1 | 0 | 0 | 0 | 0 | 0 | 0 | 0 | 0 | 0 | 1 | 4 |
Source 1: precipitation per inch on The Weather Channel
Source 2: http://www.myforecast.co/bin/climate.m?city=27576

== Demographics ==
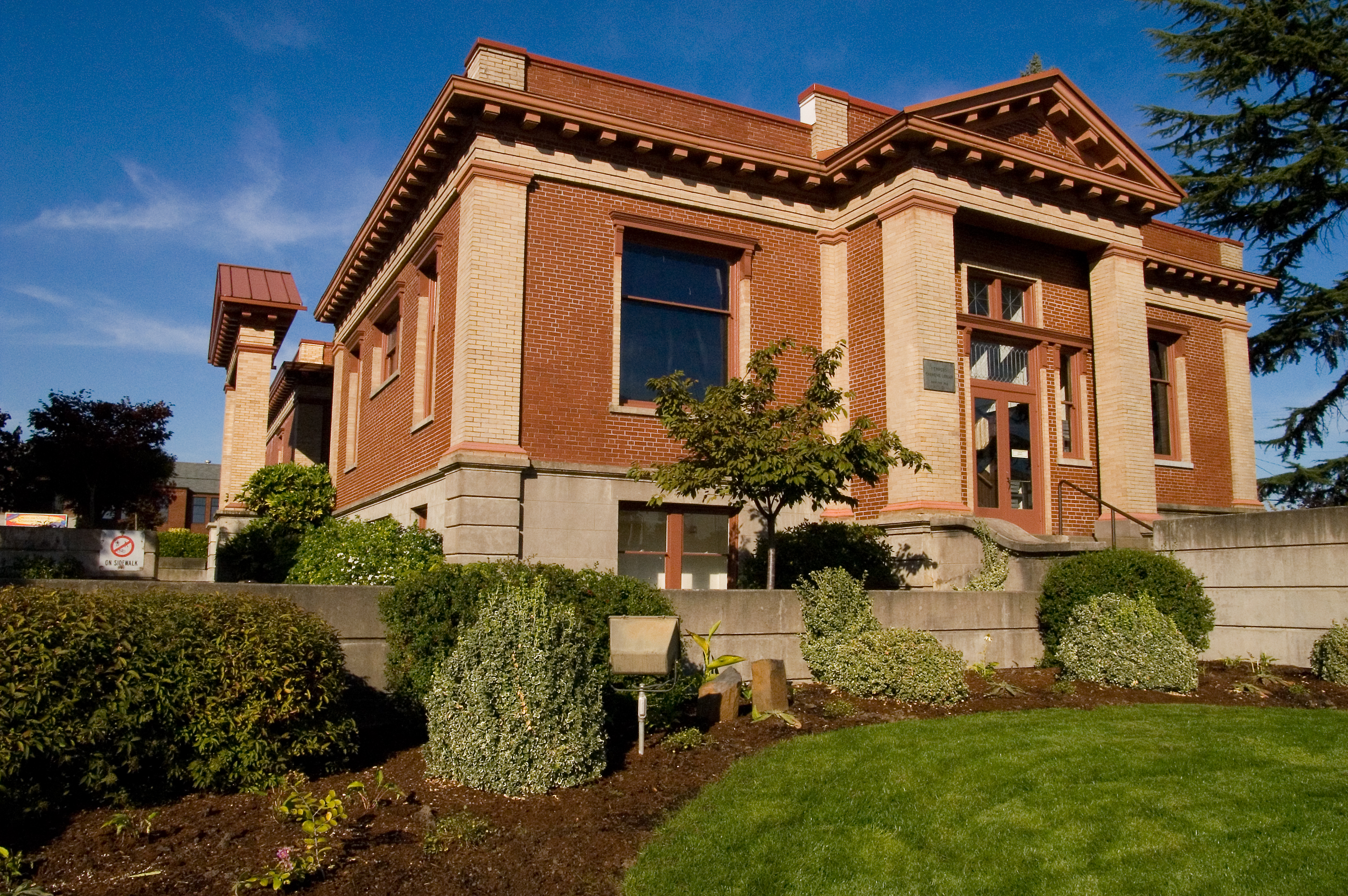
Newberg Public Library

Historical population
| Census | Pop. | Note | %± |
|---|---|---|---|
| 1890 | 514 | | — |
| 1900 | 945 | | 83.9% |
| 1910 | 2,260 | | 139.2% |
| 1920 | 2,566 | | 13.5% |
| 1930 | 2,951 | | 15.0% |
| 1940 | 2,960 | | 0.3% |
| 1950 | 3,946 | | 33.3% |
| 1960 | 4,204 | | 6.5% |
| 1970 | 6,507 | | 54.8% |
| 1980 | 10,394 | | 59.7% |
| 1990 | 13,086 | | 25.9% |
| 2000 | 18,064 | | 38.0% |
| 2010 | 22,068 | | 22.2% |
| 2020 | 25,138 | | 13.9% |

=== 2020 census ===
As of the 2020 census, Newberg had a population of 25,138. The median age was 35.2 years. 22.0% of residents were under the age of 18 and 15.6% of residents were 65 years of age or older. For every 100 females there were 94.1 males, and for every 100 females age 18 and over there were 91.1 males age 18 and over.

99.9% of residents lived in urban areas, while 0.1% lived in rural areas.

There were 9,005 households in Newberg, of which 32.6% had children under the age of 18 living in them. Of all households, 50.8% were married-couple households, 15.9% were households with a male householder and no spouse or partner present, and 26.5% were households with a female householder and no spouse or partner present. About 24.2% of all households were made up of individuals and 12.3% had someone living alone who was 65 years of age or older.

There were 9,481 housing units, of which 5.0% were vacant. Among occupied housing units, 61.3% were owner-occupied and 38.7% were renter-occupied. The homeowner vacancy rate was 1.1% and the rental vacancy rate was 5.1%.

Racial composition as of the 2020 census
| Race | Number | Percent |
|---|---|---|
| White | 19,656 | 78.2% |
| Black or African American | 216 | 0.9% |
| American Indian and Alaska Native | 285 | 1.1% |
| Asian | 494 | 2.0% |
| Native Hawaiian and Other Pacific Islander | 49 | 0.2% |
| Some other race | 1,756 | 7.0% |
| Two or more races | 2,682 | 10.7% |
| Hispanic or Latino (of any race) | 3,742 | 14.9% |

=== 2023 census ===
In 2023, the U.S. Census Bureau estimated the Newberg population at 26,095. This includes 9,379 households with 2.55 persons per household. Median household income in 2023 was estimated at $91,389, with the per capita income at $39,972. An estimated 9% of the population is in poverty.

In 2023, the racial makeup of the city was 77.9% White, 0.7% African American, 0.8% Native American, 2.5% Asian, 0.2% Pacific Islander, and 12.8% from two or more races. Hispanic or Latino of any race were 15.7% of the population.

=== 2010 census ===
As of the 2010 census, there were 22,068 people, 7,736 households, and 5,398 families living in the city. The population density was 3,798.3 inhabitants per square mile (1,466.5/km^{2}). There were 8,265 housing units at an average density of 1,422.5 per square mile (549.2/km^{2}). The racial makeup of the city was 85.9% White, 0.8% African American, 0.8% Native American, 2.2% Asian, 0.2% Pacific Islander, 7.0% from other races, and 3.1% from two or more races. Hispanic or Latino of any race were 13.5% of the population.

There were 7,736 households, of which 37.4% had children under the age of 18 living with them, 53.1% were married couples living together, 12.0% had a female householder with no husband present, 4.7% had a male householder with no wife present, and 30.2% were non-families. 23.2% of all households were made up of individuals, and 9.8% had someone living alone who was 65 years of age or older. The average household size was 2.66 and the average family size was 3.12.

The median age in the city was 32.8 years. 25.2% of residents were under the age of 18; 13.8% were between the ages of 18 and 24; 27.1% were from 25 to 44; 21.9% were from 45 to 64; and 12% were 65 years of age or older. The gender makeup of the city was 48.6% male and 51.4% female.

=== 2000 census ===
As of the census of 2000, there were 18,064 people, 6,099 households, and 4,348 families living in the city. The population density was 3,599.4 inhabitants per square mile (1,389.7/km^{2}). There were 6,435 housing units at an average density of 1,282.2 per square mile (495.1/km^{2}). The racial makeup of the city was 90.49% White, 0.35% African American, 0.64% Native American, 1.04% Asian, 0.17% Pacific Islander, 5.06% from other races, and 2.24% from two or more races. Hispanic or Latino of any race were 10.52% of the population.

There were 6,099 households, out of which 40.2% had children under the age of 18 living with them, 54.5% were married couples living together, 11.9% had a female householder with no husband present, and 28.7% were non-families. 21.7% of all households were made up of individuals, and 8.8% had someone living alone who was 65 years of age or older. The average household size was 2.76 and the average family size was 3.20.

In the city, the population was spread out, with 27.7% under the age of 18, 15.0% from 18 to 24, 29.8% from 25 to 44, 16.9% from 45 to 64, and 10.6% who were 65 years of age or older. The median age was 30 years. For every 100 females, there were 93.7 males. For every 100 females age 18 and over, there were 89.8 males.

The median income for a household in the city was $44,206.00, and the median income for a family was $51,084. Males had a median income of $34,099 versus $23,571 for females. The per capita income for the city was $16,873. About 4.3% of families and 6.6% of the population were below the poverty line, including 7.0% of those under age 18 and 6.1% of those age 65 or over.

== Economy ==
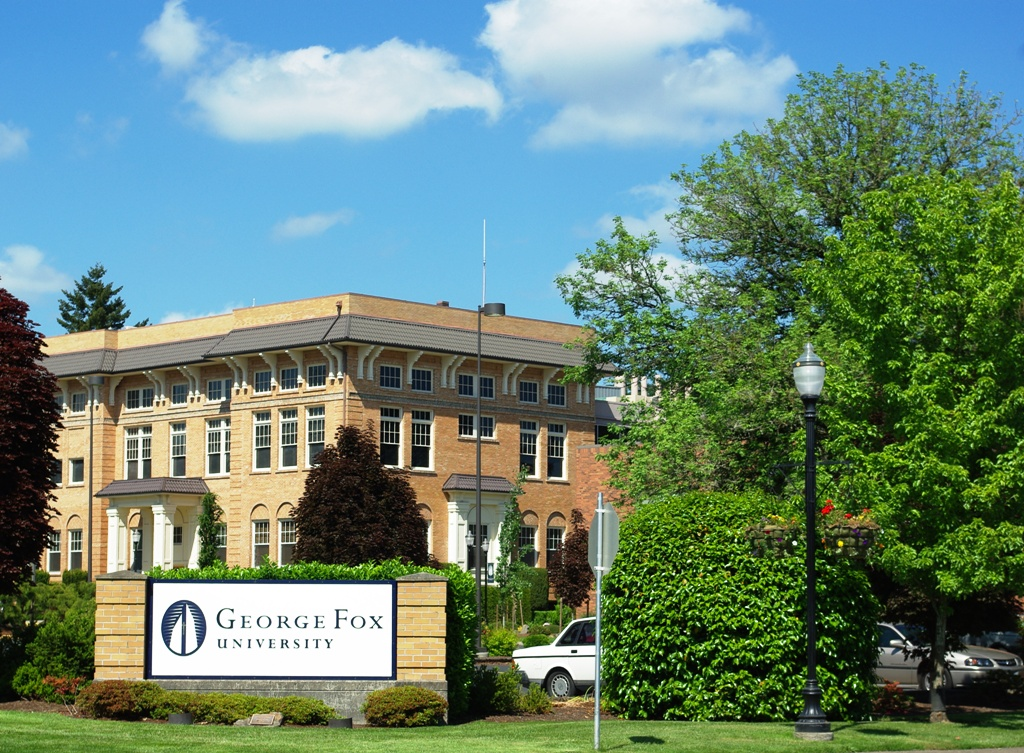
George Fox University campus

As of 2002, dental equipment manufacturer A-dec was the city's largest employer with 832 employees, and George Fox University was second with 400. The next largest employers were SP Newsprint Co., Suntron Corp., and Providence Newberg Medical Center. Upon opening in September 2009, the Allison Inn and Spa, a 77-room destination hotel, spa, and restaurant employs approximately 200 full-time workers. A Hazelden Betty Ford Foundation inpatient addiction treatment center is located in the city.

== Museums and other points of interest ==
- Ewing Young Historical Park
- Hoover-Minthorn House Museum

== Education ==
Newberg is served by Newberg-Dundee Public Schools, a school district which has six elementary schools, two middle schools, and two high schools, Newberg High School and Catalyst Alternative High School. The city also has two private Christian schools (Veritas School and C. S. Lewis Academy). Newberg is home to George Fox University, and a campus of Portland Community College that opened in 2011.

In 2021, the Newberg School Board voted to ban Pride and Black Lives Matter from being represented on campuses. In September of 2022 a lawsuit filed by the ACLU and a school district staff member was resolved with a Yamhill County Circuit Court judge ruling the school board policy was unconstitutional. At the January 10, 2023 school board meeting the policy was recinded.

== Media ==
- The Newberg Graphic

== Transportation ==
=== Road ===
| OR 18 is an east-west route connecting with US 101 in Otis Junction to the west, and OR 219 near Newberg. The highway was expanded and named as the Newberg-Dundee Bypass. |
| OR 99W (formerly US 99W) is a major north-south route which follows an east-west alignment through Newberg. It connects with Portland to the northeast, Dundee and McMinnville to the southwest, and the western Willamette Valley to the south. In combination with OR 18, this is the main route for traffic between Portland and the central Oregon Coast. |
| OR 219 is a north-south route connecting with St. Paul and Woodburn to the south, and Scholls and Hillsboro to the north. |
| OR 240 is an east-west route connecting with OR 47 in the town of Yamhill. |

=== Air ===
- Chehalem Airpark
- Sportsman Airpark

=== Rail ===
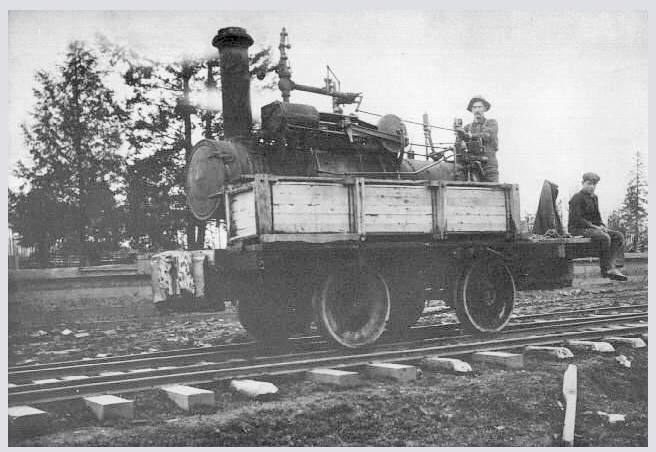
Converted Russell traction engine of the Pacific Brick Face Co. in 1907

Newberg is served by the Portland & Western Railroad which offers freight service as needed. The railroad was originally part of the Southern Pacific Railroad and was built in the 1870s. Newberg has not had regular passenger railroad service since the 1930s; however there have been several studies to consider bringing commuter rail service to the Portland metropolitan area.

== Notable people ==
- Sage Canaday — American long-distance runner and ultramarathoner
- Mindy Duncan — Miss Oregon Teen USA 1988, Miss Teen USA 1988
- Herbert Hoover — 31st President of the United States
- Del Porter — big band leader and actor
- Alex Schomburg — comic book illustrator
- Walter T. West — Oregon politician and farmer
- Ewing Young — early Oregon explorer, trapper, settler, and businessman

== Sister cities ==
- Asago, Hyōgo Prefecture, Japan
- Poysdorf, Mistelbach, Lower Austria, Austria
